= H&K =

H&K can refer to:

- Heckler & Koch, a German weapons manufacturing company
- Hill & Knowlton, an American PR consulting company
- Hughes & Kettner, a German brand of guitar and bass amplifiers, cabinets and effects processors
- Harold & Kumar, a series of stoner comedies and its titular characters
  - Harold & Kumar Go to White Castle, a 2004 film
  - Harold & Kumar Escape from Guantanamo Bay, its sequel
- Eric Harris and Dylan Klebold, American mass murder duo
- Hampstead and Kilburn, a UK parliament constituency
- The Calcium H and K lines, a pair of violet spectral lines
- "H-K (Hunter-Killer)", song by Fear Factory from the album Demanufacture, 1995
