= Eddie Kaye Thomas =

American actor (born 1980)

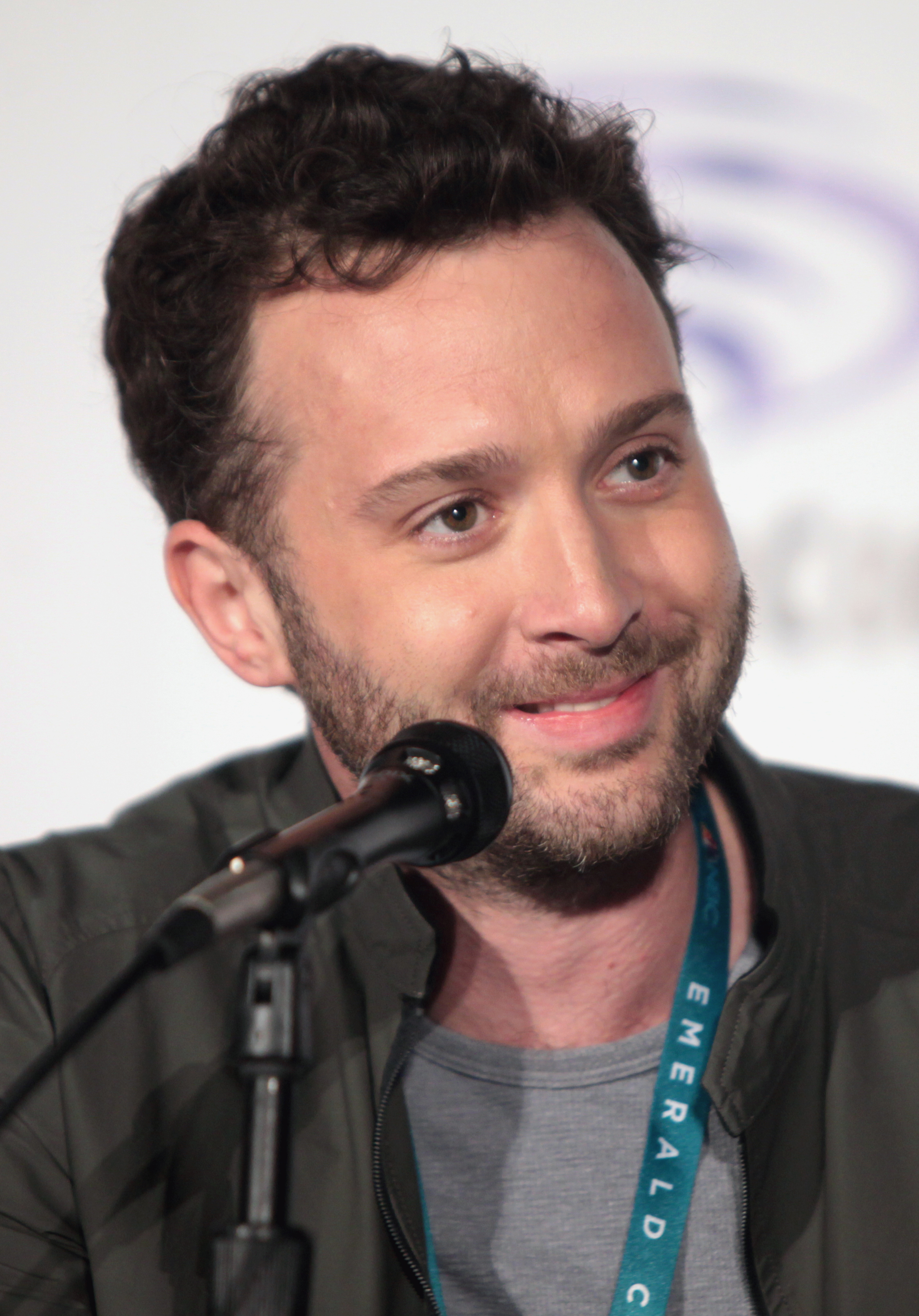
- Thomas in 2016
- Born: Edward Kovelsky; October 31, 1980 (age 45); New York City, U.S.
- Occupation: Actor
- Years active: 1992–present
- Children: 3

Eddie Kaye Thomas (born Edward Kovelsky; October 31, 1980) is an American actor. He began his career as a child actor in 1992, appearing in guest roles on multiple television shows and a supporting role in the supernatural horror film The Rage: Carrie 2 (1999). Thomas rose to prominence for his supporting role as Paul Finch in the teen sex comedy film American Pie (1999), which he reprised in a starring capacity in three sequels: American Pie 2 (2001), American Wedding (2003), and American Reunion (2012).

Following his mainstream breakout, Thomas became a notable star on television, with main roles as Russell Wise on the WB sitcom Brutally Normal (2000), Mike Platt on the WB sitcom Off Centre (2001–2002), and Jeff Woodcock on the Fox sitcom 'Til Death (2006–2008). He also starred in the comedy films Freddy Got Fingered (2001), Dirty Love (2005), and Blind Dating (2006), and had a supporting role in the Harold & Kumar film series (2004–2011).

In the 2010s, Thomas had main roles as David "Kappo" Kaplan on the HBO series How to Make It in America (2010–2011) and Toby Curtis on the CBS series Scorpion (2014–2018). Since 2005, he has provided the voice of Barry Robinson on the Fox and TBS animated sitcom American Dad!

== Early and personal life ==
Thomas was born in New Dorp, New York. He is Jewish.

In a 2020 interview promoting American Pie co-star Jason Biggs' show Outmatched, Biggs said that Eddie Kaye Thomas is a stage name. His real name is Edward Kovelsky.

Thomas stated on a podcast that he is married with three children; and that he and his wife became parents in 2018 right after Scorpion was cancelled.

== Career ==
Thomas began his acting career as a stage actor at age seven, appearing in Four Baboons Adoring the Sun in 1992, and The Diary of Anne Frank, opposite Natalie Portman in 1997. He graduated from New York's Professional Children's High School already a veteran of the Broadway stage.

Thomas made his onscreen debut in an episode of the ABC Soap Opera One Life to Live, and later starred in an episode of Are You Afraid of the Dark? about a possessed camera that destroys everything it shoots, entitled The Tale of the Curious Camera. He also appeared on Law & Order twice in 1996, playing different characters each time. On the Thanksgiving 1998 edition of Late Night with Conan O’Brien Thomas played Ricky, Conan and Andy's son home from college for the holidays.

Thomas become well-known for his role as Paul Finch in American Pie (1999), appearing in all four theatrical films of the American Pie franchise (1999–2012). His screen work also includes the independent movie called Illtown, The Rage: Carrie 2, and James Toback's controversial motion picture Black and White in which Thomas co-starred with Robert Downey, Jr. and Jared Leto. Thomas also played the title role in Canadian shock-comic Tom Green's Freddy Got Fingered, and the stereotypical Jewish character Rosenberg in Harold & Kumar Go to White Castle (2004) and Harold & Kumar Escape from Guantanamo Bay (2008) opposite David Krumholtz.

From 2001 to 2002, Thomas starred in the television series Off Centre with John Cho. He returned to the small screen in the sitcom 'Til Death for the first two seasons (2006 and 2007). His character was removed from the show for budget reasons but still appeared in season 3. Due to the writers' strike a few season 2 episodes were shown starting Wednesday, October 8, 2008. He has also appeared in the CSI: Crime Scene Investigation episode "No More Bets".

Thomas appeared in commercials for Blockbuster Video, Snickers and Nike. He also appeared in 311's music video for "Flowing".

He has continued to do stage work, appearing off Broadway in 2006, and has voiced Barry Robinson on American Dad! since 2005.

From 2010 to 2011, he appeared as David Kaplan in HBO comedy-drama television series How to Make It in America.

In 2014, he appeared as Mark in DirecTV's First Original Comedy Things You Shouldn't Say Past Midnight. In the same year, Thomas was a member of the principal cast of the TV series Scorpion on CBS as Harvard trained psychiatrist and genius behaviourist, Dr. Tobias M Curtis. The series was cancelled after completing four seasons (93 episodes) in May 2018. In 2018, he joined the cast of thriller film Shattered Memories, also known by the name Last Night.

In 2020, he reunited with his American Pie co-stars Alyson Hannigan and Jason Biggs in the Fox sitcom Outmatched.

== Filmography ==
=== Film ===
Year	Title	Role	Notes
1996	Illtown	Young Flaco	
1997	Mr. Jealousy	Nat	
1998	Harvest	Dishwasher	
1999	The Rage: Carrie 2	Arnold	
1999	American Pie	Paul Finch	
1999	Black and White	Marty King	
2000	Drop Back Ten	Gil	
2000	More Dogs Than Bones	Roy	
2001	Freddy Got Fingered	Frederick "Freddy" Brody	
2001	American Pie 2	Paul Finch	
2002	Taboo	Adam	
2002	Stolen Summer	Patrick O'Malley	
2002	Sweet Friggin' Daisies	Damian	Short film
2003	American Wedding	Paul Finch	
2003	Winter Break	Peter Rothner	
2004	Harold & Kumar Go to White Castle	Andy Rosenberg	
2004	Weekends	Shane Everett	Television film
2005	Dirty Love	John	
2005	Neo Ned	Joey	
2006	Wasted	Stan	
2006	Fifty Pills	Ralphie	
2006	Kettle of Fish	Sean	
2006	Blind Dating	Larry	
2007	On the Road with Judas	Judas	
2007	Spellband	Howard	Television film
2008	Harold & Kumar Escape from Guantanamo Bay	Andy Rosenberg	
2008	Nick and Norah's Infinite Playlist	Jesus	
2008	Nature of the Beast	Rich	Television film
2008	Good Behavior	Jesse	Television film
2010	Venus & Vegas	Alex	
2011	A Very Harold & Kumar 3D Christmas	Andy Rosenberg	
2011	Rough Sext	Eddie	Short film
2012	American Reunion	Paul Finch	
2012	Petunia	Michael Petunia	
2012	Seal Team Six: The Raid on Osama Bin Laden	Christian	Television film
2017	Alex & the List	Dave	
2018	Shattered Memories	Tim	Television film
2021	Woodstock 99: Peace, Love, and Rage	Himself	Documentary; Archive footage; uncredited
2024	Junction	Rodgers	
2025	The Roaring Game	Bobby Rhodes	

=== Television ===
Year	Title	Role	Notes
1994	One Life to Live	Dave	Episode: "Episode #1.6575" Credited as Eddie Thomas
1994	Are You Afraid of the Dark?	Matt Dorney	Episode: "The Tale of the Curious Camera"
1994	Two Guys and a Girl	Guest star	
1998	Felicity	P.J.	Episode: "Cheating"
1996; 1999	Law & Order	Ethan Vance / Chad Markham	2 episodes
2000	Brutally Normal	Russell Wise	Main role; 7 episodes
2000–2001	The X-Files	Gary Edward Cory	2 episodes
2001–2002	Off Centre	Mike Platt	Main role; 28 episodes
2001	The Weakest Link	Himself	1 episode
2003	Twilight Zone	Jonah Beech	Episode: "Rewind"
2003	Miss Match	Scott	Episode: "Kate in Ex-tasy"
2003	The Jamie Kennedy Experiment	Himself	guest star
2003	The New Tom Green Show	Himself	1 episode
2004	CSI: Crime Scene Investigation	Seth Landers	Episode: "No More Bets"
2004	Wonderfalls	Fat Pat	Episode: "Muffin Buffalo"
2005–present	American Dad!	Barry Robinson (voice)	Recurring role; 104 episodes
2006–2008	'Til Death	Jeff Woodcock	Main role (season 1–2); 39 episodes
2007	Thank God You're Here	Guest star	1 episode
2010–2011	How to Make it in America	David "Kappo" Kaplan	Main role; 16 episodes
2010	The Forgotten	Brice Walden	Episode: "Train Jane"
2012	Family Guy	Barry Robinson (voice)	Episode: "Killer Queen"
2014	Inside Amy Schumer	Guy at bar	Episode: "A Chick Who Can Hang"
2014	Things You Shouldn't Say Past Midnight	Mark	Recurring role; 5 episodes
2014–2018	Scorpion	Tobias "Toby" Curtis	Main role; 93 episodes
2019	This Is Us	Gavin	Episode: "Don't Take My Sunshine Away"
2020	Outmatched	Sigmund	Episode: "Couple's Friends"
2020	Law & Order: Special Victims Unit	Luke Mitchell	Episode: "Solving for the Unknowns"
2021	Prodigal Son	Deputy	Episode: "The Last Weekend"
2023	The Marvelous Mrs. Maisel	Adam Portnoy	Recurring role (season 5); 8 episodes
2024	Anything	Homeless Man / Executive (voice)	Web series, 2 episodes
2026	The Beauty	Mike 1	Episode: "Beautiful Patient Zero"

=== Music videos ===
Year	Title	Artist	Album
1999	"Flowing"	311	Soundsystem
2014	"Dear River"	Kina Grannis	Elements

=== Awards and nominations ===
Year	Award	Category	Work	Result
2000	Young Hollywood Awards	Best Ensemble Cast	American Pie	Won
