= Todd Strauss-Schulson =

American film director

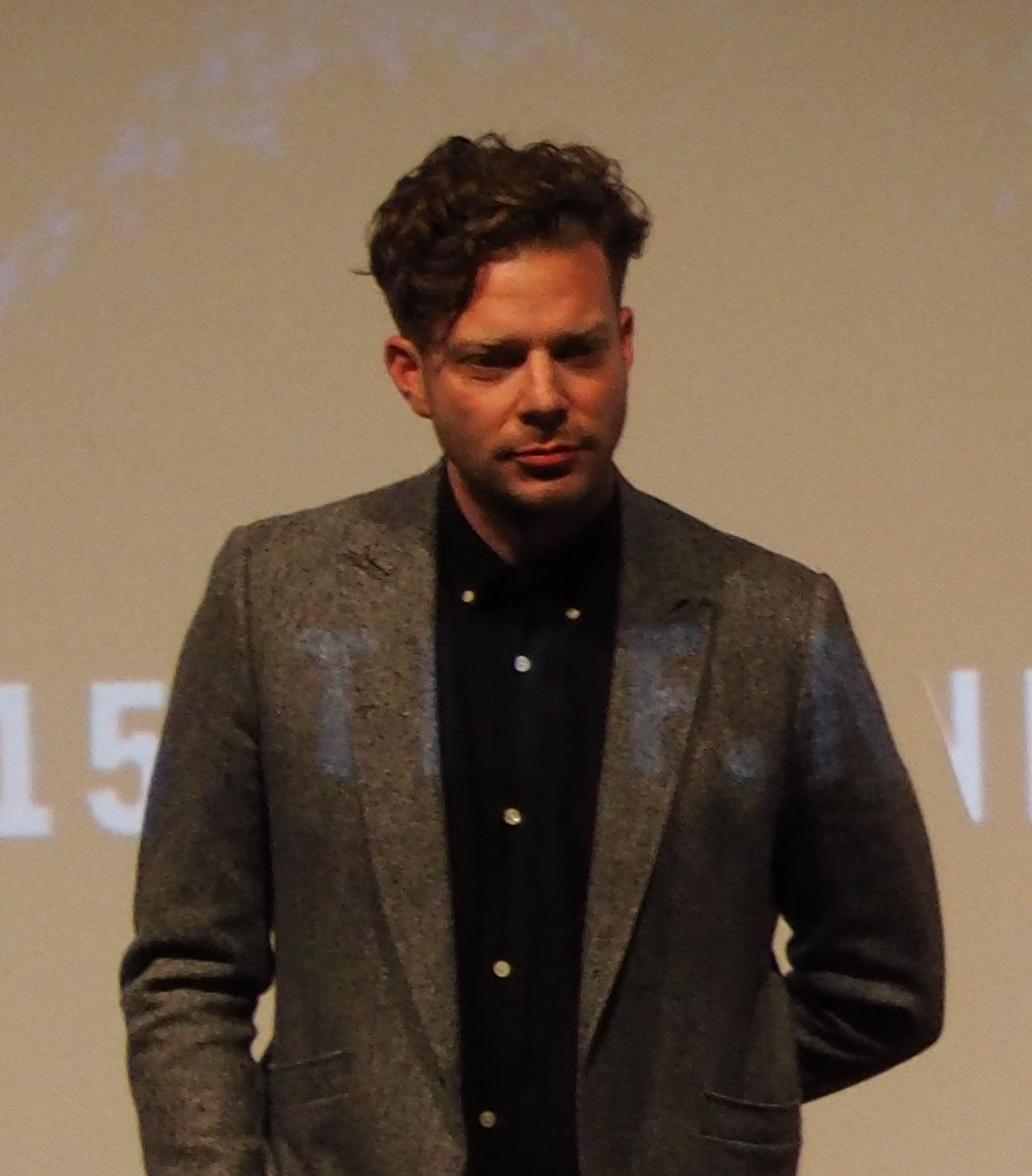
- Strauss-Schulson in September 2015
- Born: June 24, 1980 (age 45); New York City, New York, U.S.
- Occupations: Director; producer; screenwriter; cinematographer; editor
- Years active: 1997–present

Todd Strauss-Schulson (born June 24, 1980) is an American film director, screenwriter, producer, editor, and cinematographer, best known for directing the comedy film A Very Harold & Kumar 3D Christmas (2011), the horror comedy film The Final Girls (2015), and the romantic comedy film Isn't It Romantic (2019). He has also directed episodes of the television series The Inbetweeners (2012) and Zach Stone Is Gonna Be Famous (2013).

== Early life ==
Strauss-Schulson was born in Forest Hills, Queens, New York City on June 24, 1980. He has one younger sister named Caren. Strauss-Schulson is Jewish and had a Bar Mitzvah ceremony.

He attended Emerson College in Boston, Massachusetts, graduating in 2003. Following his graduation, he moved to Los Angeles.

== Career ==
Strauss-Schulson started his career directing short films such as Larceny (1997) and Backlash (1998). He then worked on music videos, which led to 6 months spent in China and Thailand, where he directed the third season of MTV Whatever Things (2005). The series became the most popular show on MTV Asia, with an international audience of over 250 million people. He has directed commercials and videos for the Academy Awards and the Emmy Awards, and clients including Pepsi, Lipton, Mountain Dew, Twix, The Early November, Nestlé, Microsoft, Old Spice, and Sierra Mist, among others.

In 2008, Strauss-Schulson's short film Mano-a-Mano was selected to screen at the South by Southwest Film Festival. The following year, he went back to South by Southwest to premiere his short film Big Pussy, which was subsequently screened at the Just For Laughs Comedy Festival in Montreal, Quebec, Canada. Strauss-Schulson's first feature film, A Very Harold & Kumar 3D Christmas for New Line Cinema and Mandate Pictures, was released by Warner Bros. on November 4, 2011. The film starred Kal Penn, John Cho, Neil Patrick Harris, and Patton Oswalt, and was met with a positive reaction from film critics.

His sophomore film, the horror comedy The Final Girls for Sony Pictures Entertainment and Groundswell Productions, premiered at South by Southwest Film Festival on March 13, 2015, to positive reviews. The film stars Taissa Farmiga, Malin Åkerman, Nina Dobrev, Adam DeVine, Thomas Middleditch, Alia Shawkat, and Alexander Ludwig. It was released on October 9, 2015, in a limited release and through video on demand by Stage 6 Films.

In October 2015, it was reported that TBS had given a pilot order to a comedy series co-created by Strauss-Schulson and Matt Fogel. The pilot was not ordered to series.

Strauss-Schulson's third feature film as director is the comedy Isn't It Romantic for New Line Cinema, starring Rebel Wilson, Liam Hemsworth, DeVine, and Priyanka Chopra. The film was released by Warner Bros. on February 14, 2019.

== Filmography ==
Films

- A Very Harold & Kumar 3D Christmas (2011)
- The Final Girls (2015)
- Isn't It Romantic (2019)
- Silent Retreat (TBA) (Also writer)
- Untitled Rabbids film (TBA)

Television

Year	Title	Notes
2007	Ace of Cakes	Episode "Great Scot"
2010	Naked But Funny	TV movie
2011	CollegeHumor Originals	Episode "Sorority Pillow Fight"
2012	Stevie TV	Episode "#1.1"
2012	The Inbetweeners	3 episodes
2013	Zach Stone Is Gonna Be Famous	3 episodes
2013	Betas	Episode "One on One"
2022	Pitch Perfect: Bumper in Berlin	2 episodes
2023	Glamorous	2 episodes

Short films

Year	Title	Director	Writer	Producer	Editor	DoP
1997	Larceny	Yes	Yes	Yes	No	Yes
2005	Snap*Pop	Yes	Yes	No	No	No
2008	Mano-a-Mano	Yes	Yes	Yes	Yes	Yes
2011	The Master Cleanse	Yes	Yes	No	Yes	No
2013	Valibation	Yes	No	No	Yes	No
2014	All's Fair	Yes	Yes	No	Yes	No
