= Greg Shapiro (producer) =

American producer

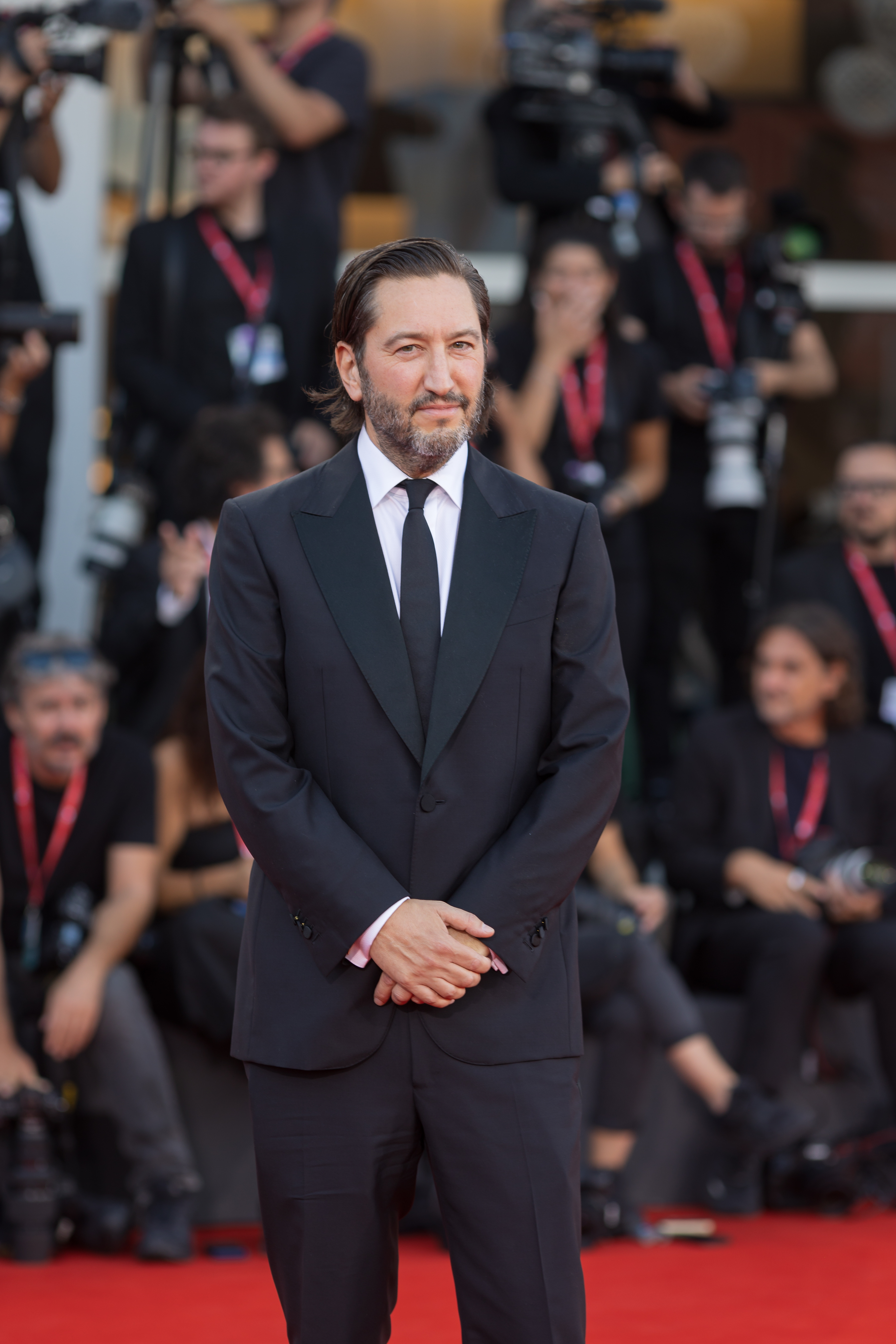
- Shapiro in 2025
- Born: Gregory Brian Shapiro; December 16, 1972 (age 53); Los Angeles, California, U.S.
- Occupation: Producer

Gregory Brian Shapiro (born December 16, 1972) is an American producer. He won an Academy Award in the category Best Picture for the film The Hurt Locker. He is also known for producing the Harold & Kumar franchise.

== Selected filmography ==
- The Rules of Attraction (2002)
- Harold & Kumar Go to White Castle (2004)
- Harold & Kumar Escape from Guantanamo Bay (2008)
- The Hurt Locker (2009; co-won with Kathryn Bigelow, Mark Boal and Nicolas Chartier)
- The Rum Diary (2011)
- A Very Harold & Kumar Christmas (2011)
- Zero Dark Thirty (2012; executive producer)
- Detroit (2017)
- The Professor (2018)
- Serenity (2019)
- Metal Lords (2022)
- A House of Dynamite (2025)
