= Harold & Kumar Go to White Castle =

2004 film by Danny Leiner

- Theatrical release poster
- Directed by: Danny Leiner
- Written by: Jon Hurwitz; Hayden Schlossberg
- Produced by: Nathan Kahane; Greg Shapiro
- Starring: John Cho; Kal Penn; Neil Patrick Harris; Anthony Anderson; Fred Willard
- Cinematography: Bruce Douglas Johnson
- Edited by: Jeff Betancourt
- Music by: David Kitay
- Production companies: Senator International; Kingsgate Films; Endgame Entertainment
- Distributed by: New Line Cinema (United States); Senator Entertainment (International)
- Release date: July 30, 2004
- Running time: 88 minutes
- Country: United States
- Language: English
- Budget: $9 million
- Box office: $24.3 million

Harold & Kumar Go to White Castle (released in some international markets as Harold & Kumar Get the Munchies) is a 2004 American buddy stoner comedy film directed by Danny Leiner, written by Jon Hurwitz and Hayden Schlossberg, and starring John Cho, Kal Penn, Neil Patrick Harris, Anthony Anderson and Fred Willard. The first installment in the Harold & Kumar franchise, the film follows Harold Lee (Cho) and Kumar Patel (Penn) on their adventure to a White Castle restaurant after smoking marijuana.

Hurwitz and Schlossberg developed Harold & Kumar Go to White Castle based on experiences and people from when they attended Randolph High School. The filmmakers received license permission from White Castle in 2002. White Castle also contributed to the film's marketing campaign, releasing tie-in products at their restaurants. Cho and Harris (who portrays a fictionalized version of himself) were cast early, whereas Penn attended seven auditions. Principal photography began in 2003, with filming primarily done in Toronto.

Harold & Kumar Go to White Castle was theatrically released in the United States on July 30, 2004, by New Line Cinema, with Senator Entertainment releasing in other territories. The film received positive critical reception, with praise for the performances of its leads (particularly Harris) and subversion of racial and comedic stereotypes. The film has gone on to gather a cult following. The sequel, Harold & Kumar Escape from Guantanamo Bay, was released internationally in April 2008.

== Plot ==
Investment banker Harold Lee is coerced by his colleagues into doing their work while they go out partying. His friend, Kumar Patel, attends a medical school interview, but intentionally botches it to prevent getting accepted.

After Harold fails once again to talk to his attractive neighbor, Maria, he and Kumar smoke marijuana together, during which they see an advertisement for White Castle and decide to get hamburgers. They travel to the nearest one in New Brunswick, but find it replaced by "Burger Shack". However, they are told of another White Castle in Cherry Hill.

On the way there, Kumar stops at Princeton University to buy more marijuana. A student agrees to sell him some, but Kumar is forced to flee when discovered by campus security. Harold and Kumar resume their drive when Kumar pulls over to urinate, where a raccoon gets in the car and bites Harold.

Kumar reluctantly takes him to the hospital where Kumar's father and older brother work. Before leaving, Kumar is confronted by his father, also a doctor, who has heard about his interview and threatens to cut him off unless he starts to act responsibly. He attempts to obtain medical marijuana using a stolen ID, but is mistaken for his brother. He performs surgery on a gunshot victim, who tells them how to reach White Castle.

Kumar spots Maria and attempts to get her attention for Harold, who panics and crashes the car. They are rescued by tow-truck driver Freakshow, who takes them to his house to repair their car; there Harold and Kumar are propositioned by Freakshow's wife, but after Freakshow suggests a foursome, they flee in disgust.

Back on the road, Kumar picks up a hitchhiker, Neil Patrick Harris, who is high on ecstasy and steals their car when they go into a convenience store to get directions. The duo are then harassed by a racist police officer for jaywalking. Harold attempts to punch Kumar for escalating the encounter with the officer, but ends up punching the officer instead, resulting in his arrest.

Kumar fakes a 911 call to draw the police away from the station, then breaks in to free Harold. They encounter an escaped cheetah, whom they smoke marijuana with, and ride it to safety.

Harold and Kumar steal the truck of a group of extreme sports fanatics who have been harassing them and are pursued to a cliff edge. Spotting the White Castle below, Harold and Kumar use a hang glider from the truck to reach their destination.

The pair place their orders but are disheartened to find they have no money, when Neil Patrick Harris suddenly appears and pays for their meal as an apology for stealing their car. When Harold sees his co-workers pull up with two women, he gets angry. He realizes they lied to him about having to meet clients, warning them he will tell their boss if it happens again.

Kumar accepts that he wants to be a doctor, but has been afraid of conforming to the stereotype of Indians becoming doctors. After returning to their apartment, Harold professes his feelings to Maria and they kiss.

After Maria informs Harold she is leaving for Amsterdam but will return in ten days, Kumar convinces Harold to go after her, reminding him that marijuana is legal in the Netherlands.

== Cast ==
- John Cho as Harold Lee, a first-generation Korean-American investment banker who lives with his best friend and roommate Kumar
- Kal Penn as Kumar Patel, a first-generation Indian-American whose family thinks that he will become a doctor like his father and brother. He lives with his best friend and roommate Harold.
- Paula Garcès as Maria Perez, Harold and Kumar's neighbor, on whom Harold has a crush.
- Neil Patrick Harris as a fictionalized version of himself.
- David Krumholtz as Seth Goldstein, Harold and Kumar's neighbor and Rosenberg's roommate
- Eddie Kaye Thomas as Andy Rosenberg, Harold and Kumar's neighbor and Goldstein's roommate
- Christopher Meloni as Randy/Freakshow, a car mechanic with oozing boils on his face and neck who fixed Harold and Kumar's car
- Ryan Reynolds as an OR nurse implied to have sexual feelings for Indian-American men
- Fred Willard as Dr. Willoughby, medical school dean who interviewed Kumar
- Anthony Anderson as the Burger Shack Employee
- Brooke D'Orsay as Clarissa, twin sister student at Princeton University who agreed to smoke weed with Kumar
- Kate Kelton as Chrissy, twin sister student at Princeton University who agreed to smoke weed with Kumar
- Steve Braun as Cole, the leader of a recurring gang of five obnoxious extreme-sports-obsessed delinquents who often harass the pair or others around them.
- Sandy Jobin-Bevans as Officer Palumbo, a racist police officer who bullies Harold and Kumar.
- Robert Tinkler as J.D.
- Albert Howell as Security Guard
- Angelo Tsarouchas as Mean Tollbooth Guy
- Jordan Prentice as Giant Bag of Weed
- Siu Ta as Cindy Kim, student at Princeton University who has a crush on Harold
- Bobby Lee as Kenneth Park
- Malin Åkerman as Liane, Freakshow's wife
- Shaun Majumder as Saikat Patel, Kumar's older brother
- Errol Sitahal as Dr. Patel, Kumar and Saikat's father
- Dov Tiefenbach as Bradley Thomas, student at Princeton University who sold weed to Kumar
- Gary Anthony Williams as Tarik Jackson, a philosophical black man who has been arrested for being black
- Boyd Banks as E.R. Patient
- Gary Archibald as Nathaniel Banks
- Jamie Kennedy as Creepy Guy (uncredited)
- Ethan Embry as Billy Carver

== Production ==
While living in Los Angeles, screenwriters Jon Hurwitz and Hayden Schlossberg decided to write a low-budget stoner film and base the main characters on their high school friends from Randolph High School. They based the character of Harold on their real-life friend Harold Lee. Hurwitz got the idea to base the film around White Castle from his own experience craving White Castle burgers when he lived in Pennsylvania for several years. At the time, Pennsylvania did not have any White Castle locations and Hurwitz had to have family members bring him frozen White Castle burgers from New Jersey. Hurwitz and Schlossberg pitched the film to every studio, but they wanted to whitewash the main characters.

The filmmakers received permission from White Castle in 2002 to use the chain's name in the film. One scene that depicted a White Castle being closed was changed at the request of the company's director of marketing.

Despite receiving top billing, Kal Penn revealed that he and John Cho did not get a big paycheck from the movie, with each only receiving a gross salary of $75,000 before numerous deductions to which Penn explained, "You deduct your taxes, 10% to your agent, 15% your manager, 5% to your lawyer, your publicity fees, and then your rent...And it averages out to probably about five-and-a-half months of living expenses once you've paid everybody and paid your taxes." Penn said that a working actor was likely to keep "maybe 30% of your paycheck" after paying taxes and service fees; his work from the movie left him with about $22,500 from his earnings.

=== Casting ===
Hurwitz and Schlossberg included a role for Neil Patrick Harris as himself in the script without asking him first. Harris liked the script and agreed to appear in the film. Ralph Macchio was the backup choice if Harris declined. Hundreds of actors auditioned for the title roles. They also approached John Cho and Kal Penn to try out the parts who were initially skeptical about the project. During casting, both Penn and actor Sendhil Ramamurthy were being considered for the role of Kumar. After auditioning seven times, Penn eventually won the part. The role of Harold was between either Cho, Bobby Lee, Randall Park or Dante Basco. Ryan Reynolds agreed to do a cameo in the film after working with Penn on Van Wilder.

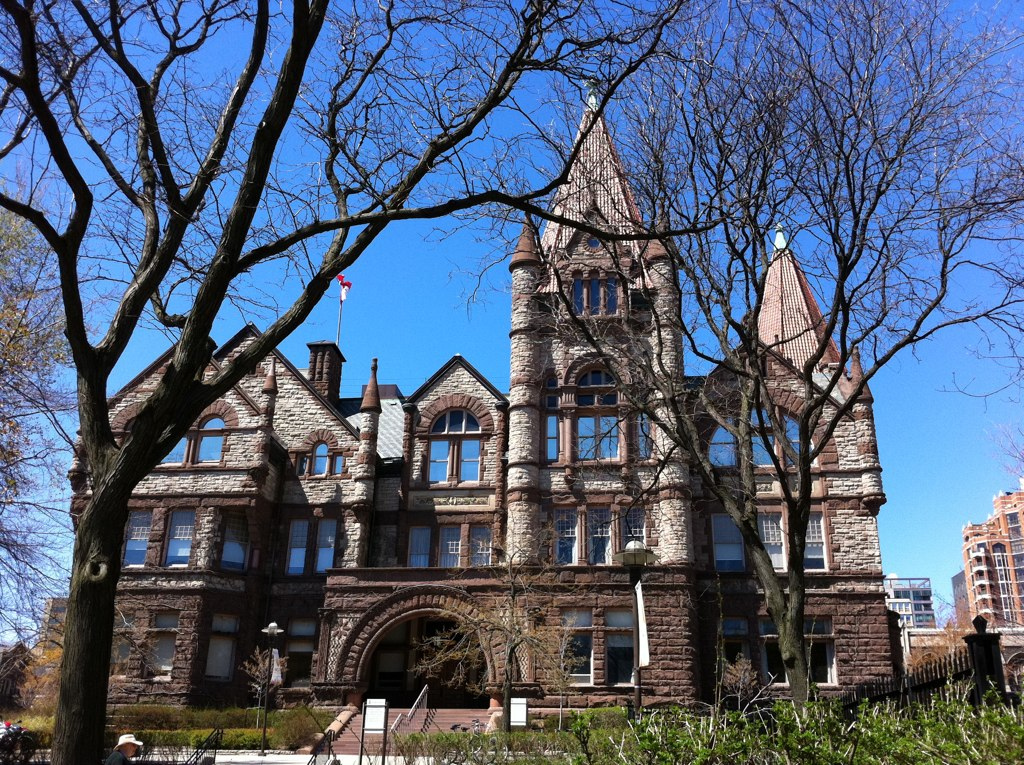
The University of Toronto's St. George campus was used as one of the sets in Harold & Kumar Go to White Castle.

=== Pre-production ===
The writers, Jon Hurwitz and Hayden Schlossberg, said that they were tired of teen movies that were one-dimensional and had characters who did not look like any of their friends, who were a diverse group. This prompted them to write a film that was both smart and funny and cast two guys who looked like their best friends. They had been putting Harold and Kumar, who were Asian American, into all of their screenplays as the main characters, but had difficulty pitching to studios. "Our logic at the time was like nobody else is writing a stoner comedy about an [East] Asian dude and an Indian dude going to get White Castle," said Hurwitz, though director Danny Leiner remembered, "Before the casting and trying to get the money before Luke [Ryan, the executive producer] came on, we were going to a couple of the studios and one was like, "Look, we really love this movie. Why don't we do it with a white guy and a black dude?" John Cho mentioned the writers wanted to avoid whitewashing the main leads, so they wrote ethnic-specific scenes in the script. Cho recalled, "It had to be rooted in that as a defense mechanism so that they wouldn’t get turned white." Schlossberg commented, "There had never been an Asian character without an accent except for [Cho] as the MILF guy. A lot of people read the script and just assumed they might be foreign exchange students, so you really had to emphasize that these guys were born in America. It was a totally different world."

Kal Penn stated that the reason the movie was greenlit was because there were two junior execs at New Line Cinema who were given this new project and decided to take a chance on it. Penn explained, "The older people around Hollywood, the older people in town were like, 'We don't know if America is ready for two Asian American men as leads in a comedy.'"

A few days before shooting the movie, Cho knocked on Penn's door and told him, "If we're supposed to be best friends, we'd better start hanging out together." They went to get a beer together and under artificial conditions, began a real friendship.

=== Filming ===
Harold & Kumar began filming on May 12, 2003. The film is set in New Jersey, but was mainly filmed in Toronto, Ontario, Canada. Scenes set at Princeton University were actually filmed at the University of Toronto's Victoria College and Knox College. The production design team had to build a White Castle franchise especially for the shoot since Canada does not have White Castle restaurants. During filming, Penn ate veggie burgers as he is a vegetarian.

== Soundtrack ==
Harold & Kumar Go to White Castle – Soundtrack

Soundtrack album by Various Artists
- Released: July 27, 2004
- Label: Bulletproof

Harold & Kumar Go to White Castle: Original Soundtrack was released on July 27, 2004. It contains 16 songs from the film.

Track list

1. "Chick Magnet" – MxPx
2. "One Good Spliff" – Ziggy Marley / The Melody Makers
3. "Yeah (Dream of Me)" – All Too Much
4. "Righteous Dub" – Long Beach Dub All Stars
5. "Skunk One" – Kottonmouth Kings
6. "Same Old Song" – Phunk Junkeez
7. "White Castle Blues" – The Smithereens
8. "Crazy On You" – Heart
9. "Cameltoe" – Fannypack
10. "Kinda High, Kinda Drunk" – Coolio
11. "Mary Jane" – Rick James
12. "I Wanna Get Next to You" – Rose Royce
13. "Hold On" – Wilson Phillips
14. "Ridin'" – Classic & 86
15. "Arrival at White Castle" – Heiruspecs
16. "Total Eclipse of the Heart" – Nicki French

Songs that are in the film but do not appear on the soundtrack include:

- "Also Sprach Zarathustra" – David Kitay, Richard Strauss
- "Baby Baby" – Amy Grant
- "Ballin' Boy" – No Good
- "Click Click Pow" – Lexicon
- "Warrior Dance" – Zion I feat. Pep Love
- "Fall In Line" – Phunk Junkeez
- "Faraway" – Dara Schindler
- "Gangsta Gangsta" – J. O'Neal / D. Black
- "Girl From Ypsilanti" – Daniel May
- "Let's Get Retarded" – Black Eyed Peas
- "Looney" – Moonshine Bandits
- "Mariachi Speier" – Eric Speier
- "On the Ganges" – Matt Hirt
- "Rock to the Rhythm" – Lexicon
- "Rock Your Body 2004" – Stagga Lee
- "Ooh Wee" – Mark Ronson

== Release ==
=== Marketing ===
In the 11 days before the film's release, New Line Cinema turned a parking lot on Sunset Strip into a temporary White Castle. The restaurant served 40,000 burgers to patrons, including Quentin Tarantino, Farrah Fawcett and Jay Leno.

White Castle launched several promotions in tandem with the film's release. The restaurant chain featured beverage cups with pictures of Harold and Kumar. They also provided free hamburgers to moviegoers attending the film's premiere. Cho and Penn were inducted into the company's White Castle Cravers Hall of Fame in 2004.

=== Box office ===
In its opening weekend, the film grossed $5,480,378 in 2,135 theatres in the United States and Canada. In total, it had a worldwide gross of $23,936,908 on a $9 million budget.

=== Critical reception ===
The film was positively received by critics, with a 75% rating at Rotten Tomatoes based on 146 reviews; the consensus states, "The likable leads and subversion of racial stereotypes elevate Harold and Kumar above the typical stoner comedy." On Metacritic, the film holds a score of 64 out of 100 based on 29 reviews from critics.

Film critic Roger Ebert of the Chicago Sun-Times awarded the film 3 out of 4 stars and wrote "One secret of fiction is the creation of unique characters who are precisely defined. The secret of comedy is the same, with the difference being that the characters must be obsessed with unwholesome but understandable human desires."

== Home media ==
The "Extreme Unrated" edition of the DVD was released on January 4, 2005. It includes special features like a mockumentary, "The Art of the Fart", "The Backseat Interview", an interview with Cho and Penn, and a making-of featurette about the Land of Burgers animated segment. The DVD also features two commentaries: one by writers Jon Hurwitz and Hayden Schlossberg and one by actor Dan Bochart in character as Extreme Sports Punk #1.

Although the movie was not successful in theaters, New Line told the producers that they were doing "three or four times the business on DVD that one would expect based on the box office."

The film was re-released on DVD in 2007 and a remastered edition was released in 2008. The film was released on Blu-ray on November 13, 2012.

As of August 17, 2008, the film had 2,878,770 DVD sales in the United States, grossing $30,609,751.

== Sequels ==
Harold & Kumar Escape from Guantanamo Bay is the 2008 sequel to White Castle. The movie revolves around Harold and Kumar trying to get to Amsterdam to find Maria, but when the two are mistaken for terrorists on the plane, they are sent to the Guantanamo Bay detention camp.

Both Hurwitz and Schlossberg announced plans to write a third Harold and Kumar film, with Greg Shapiro returning as producer, and Kal Penn and John Cho returning in their title roles, while Todd Strauss-Schulson directed the film. A Very Harold & Kumar 3D Christmas was released on November 4, 2011, in 2D and 3D.

== Related media ==
- 4X20: Quick Hits episode 1 featured a documentary episode with the cast and crew of Harold & Kumar Go to White Castle
