= Kal Penn =

American actor and civil servant (born 1977)

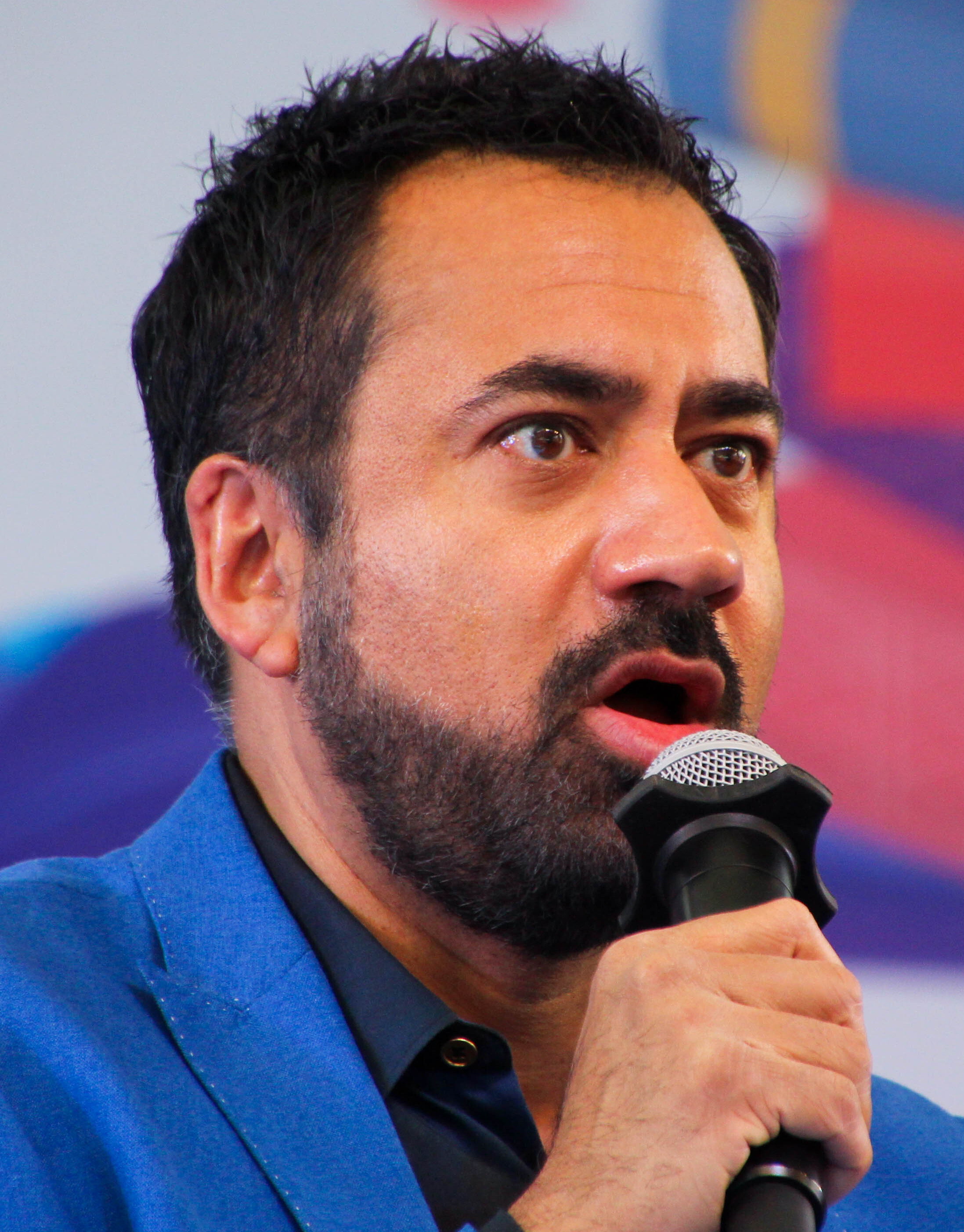
- Penn in 2025
- Born: Kalpen Suresh Modi; April 23, 1977 (age 49); Montclair, New Jersey, U.S.
- Education: University of California, Los Angeles (BA)
- Years active: 1997–present
- Political party: Democratic
- Partner(s): Josh (2010–present, engaged)

Kalpen Suresh Modi (Gujarati: કલ્પેન સુરેશ મોદી; kəl-PAIN su-REYSH MOH-thee; born April 23, 1977), known professionally as Kal Penn, is an American actor, author, and former White House staff member in the Barack Obama administration.

As an actor he is known for his portrayals of Kumar Patel in the Harold & Kumar film series, Lawrence Kutner on the television program House, White House staffer Seth Wright on Designated Survivor, and Kevin Venkataraghavan, a psychologist and boyfriend to Robin in How I Met Your Mother. He is also recognized for his performance in the film The Namesake. Penn once taught at the University of Pennsylvania in the Cinema Studies Program as a visiting lecturer.

In April 2009, Penn joined the Obama administration as an associate director in the White House Office of Public Engagement as liaison for outreach to Asian Pacific Americans and arts communities. This necessitated that his TV character, Lawrence Kutner, be written out of House. Penn briefly left his post in June 2010 to film the third installment of the Harold & Kumar series, A Very Harold & Kumar 3D Christmas, returning to his White House job upon the film's completion. In July 2011, he again left the White House to accept a role in the television series How I Met Your Mother.

From 2016 to 2019, he played Seth Wright in the political drama Designated Survivor, where he also worked as a consultant on the show. He also hosted the game show Superhuman. In 2019, Penn portrayed Garrett Modi in the NBC sitcom series Sunnyside. The following year, he hosted a political talk miniseries on Freeform, Kal Penn Approves This Message.

== Early life and education ==
Penn was born as Kalpen Suresh Modi in Montclair, New Jersey on April 23, 1977, to Gujarati immigrant parents from Gujarat, India. His mother, Asmita Bhatt, is a fragrance evaluator for a perfume company, and his father, Suresh Modi, (Gujarati: સુરેશ મોદી) is an engineer. His father is from Kheda and his mother was born in Vadodara. Kal Penn regularly visited Gujarat as a child during vacations, and he can speak some Gujarati as well as some Hindi. He has stated that stories of his grandparents marching with Mahatma Gandhi during the Indian independence movement were a significant influence on his interest in politics.

Kal Penn attended Marlboro Middle School in Marlboro Township, New Jersey, where he played baritone saxophone in the jazz band. For high school he attended Freehold Township High School for all four years where he was enrolled in the International Studies Program the first two years. His Junior and Senior years he attended The Fine and Performing Arts Center (a magnet program) at Howell High School in the Acting program (FPAC is a part time program, so he was bused between schools). Both schools are part of the Freehold Regional High School District in New Jersey. He was active in the schools' theater productions and competed on the Freehold Township National Honor Society Speech and Debate team (formerly known as Forensics). He then attended UCLA, where he double majored in film and sociology, graduating with a B.A. in 2000.

== Career ==
=== Acting career ===
Penn's film debut came in 1998 in Express: Aisle to Glory. He has since appeared in American Desi, Van Wilder, the final episode of The Lonely Island, Malibu's Most Wanted, A Lot Like Love, Dude, Where's the Party?, Love Don't Cost a Thing, Superman Returns, Epic Movie, The Namesake, the Harold & Kumar series, Buffy the Vampire Slayer, Angel and an uncredited appearance in Deck the Halls.

Penn says that he derived his acting name, Kal Penn, as a lark: "Almost as a joke to prove friends wrong, and half as an attempt to see if what I was told would work (that anglicized names appeal more to a white-dominated industry), I put 'Kal Penn' on my resume and photos." His audition callbacks rose by 50 percent. He has stated that he prefers his birth name and uses "Kal Penn" only for professional purposes.

In January 2007, Penn appeared in the first four episodes of the sixth season of 24 as Ahmed Amar, a teenage terrorist. Penn says he nearly turned down the role due to personal ethics:

I have a huge political problem with the role. It was essentially accepting a form of racial profiling. I think it's repulsive. But it was the first time I had a chance to blow stuff up and take a family hostage. As an actor, why shouldn't I have that opportunity? Because I'm brown and I should be scared about the connection between media images and people's thought processes?

Also in January 2007, he appeared in the spoof comedy Epic Movie as well as the television show Law & Order: Special Victims Unit. In May 2007, Penn received the Asian Excellence Award for Outstanding Actor for his performance in The Namesake. In fall 2007, Penn joined the cast of the Fox medical drama House as a fellowship applicant.

E! reported that Penn had signed on as a regular on the show along with Olivia Wilde and Peter Jacobson and this was confirmed in the plot of the episode "Games". Penn continued with the series through to the episode "Simple Explanation", which aired April 6, 2009. He made an additional appearance as Lawrence Kutner on the fifth-season finale, "Both Sides Now", that aired on May 11, 2009. However, due to his new job at the White House, Penn could not be present for the filming of this episode. The clip of him saying "Too bad it isn't true" was taken from a previous filming. Penn returned to the show for the series finale.

In addition to his role on the TV series House, he is best known for his role in Harold & Kumar, as Kumar Patel, a pothead who goes with Harold Lee (John Cho) to White Castle for hamburgers. Unlike his character, he does not smoke marijuana, saying it is not for him, nor does he eat meat.

Penn had a recurring role on How I Met Your Mother for the seventh season of the show, in which he played Kevin, a therapist and later boyfriend of Robin Scherbatsky. Starting May 1, 2013, Penn hosted Big Brain Theory: Pure Genius on the Discovery Channel. In 2013, Penn joined the cast of We Are Men.

In 2014, he was cast in Ravi Kumar's film Bhopal: A Prayer for Rain, a film about the Bhopal gas tragedy, considered by many to be the world's worst industrial disaster. Penn played Detective Fontanelle White on the CBS comedy-drama Battle Creek, which was canceled during its first season.

In October 2016, Penn began a regular role in the ABC drama series Designated Survivor as Seth Wright, a White House speech writer who originally worked under the previous president's administration. Following the death of the White House Press Secretary in the pilot episode and the acting press secretary walking out on the job, his character gets promoted to Press Secretary. Penn also served as a political consultant for the series. The show was renewed by Netflix for a third season which was released on June 7, 2019.

On March 7, 2019, Penn was cast in the main role of Garrett Modi on the NBC comedy Sunnyside and the series was ordered on May 6, 2019. The show was cancelled after eight episodes were produced.

On May 9, 2020, Penn was cast as a lead on the 2021 CBS thriller drama series Clarice, a sequel to The Silence of the Lambs.

On December 2, 2021, Penn was set to produce and star in the biopic Superfan which depicts the story of Nav Bhatia.

In 2022, he was cast as Simon Choksi/Santa on The Santa Clauses, for which he received a nominations for the Outstanding Supporting Performance at the 2nd Children's and Family Emmy Awards.

In 2023, Penn guest starred in the Netflix animated series Scott Pilgrim Takes Off.

=== Political activities ===
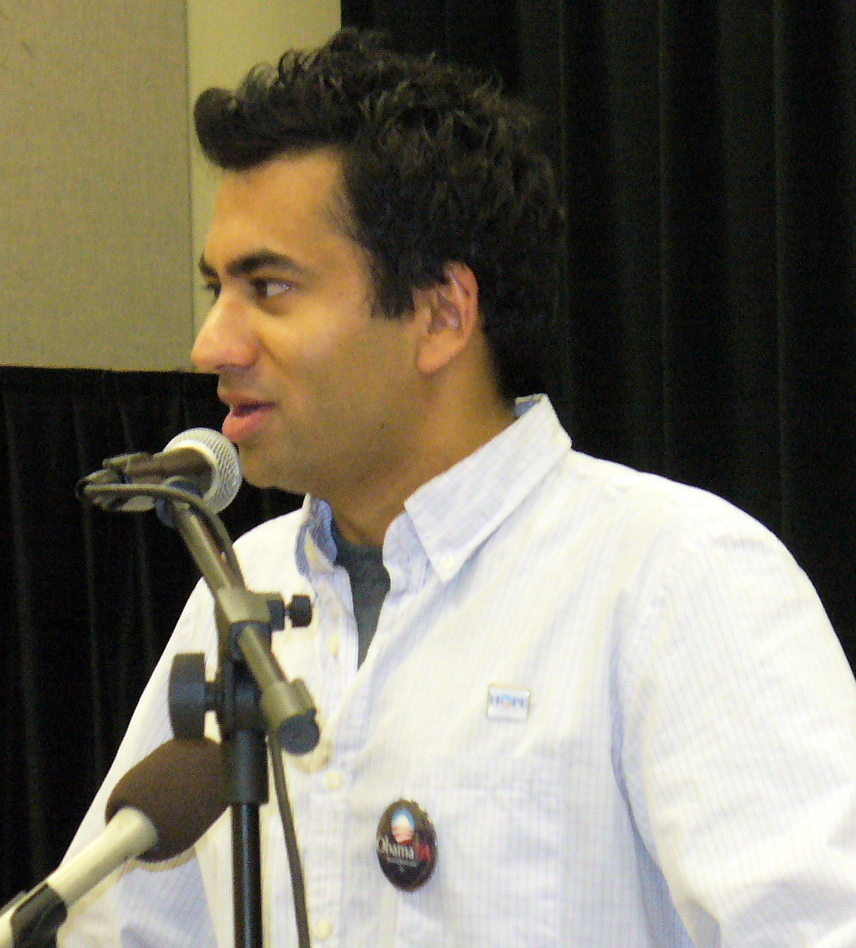
Kal Penn speaking at a rally for President Barack Obama at the University of Maryland's Nyumburu Cultural Center

Penn was an advocate for Barack Obama's presidential campaign in 2007 and 2008 and a member of Obama's National Arts Policy Committee. He appears in the Barack Obama-supporting video "Sí Se Puede Cambiar" by Andres Useche and appeared with comedian George Lopez on January 18, 2009, at "We Are One: The Obama Inaugural Celebration at the Lincoln Memorial".

In early 2009, Penn was offered the position of Associate Director of the White House Office of Public Engagement and Intergovernmental Affairs, which he accepted. This necessitated his character Lawrence Kutner being written out of the television series House. In his new role with the Obama administration, Penn served as a liaison with the Asian-American and Pacific Islander communities. He went back to using his birth name, Kalpen Modi.

Having made a commitment before his employment at the White House, Penn left his post as Obama's associate director of public engagement on June 1, 2010, to return to his acting career. He returned to office on November 15, 2010, following completion of A Very Harold & Kumar 3D Christmas.

Penn was a co-chair of Obama's reelection campaign. On September 3, 2012, he hosted coverage of the 2012 Democratic National Convention in Charlotte, North Carolina. Penn's speech at the convention encouraged young people to register to vote and defended Obama's record.

On November 18, 2013, Obama appointed Penn to serve on the President's Committee on the Arts and Humanities. On February 28, 2014, Penn served as the Master of Ceremonies for the White House Student Film Festival.

Penn publicly supported Bernie Sanders for the 2016 Democratic nomination. He campaigned for Hillary Clinton after she became the nominee.

In August 2017, Penn and the other members of the President's Committee on the Arts and Humanities resigned in protest of President Donald Trump's remarks about the Unite the Right rally in Charlottesville, Virginia.

During the 2020 Democratic presidential primaries, Penn expressed interest in the messages of Pete Buttigieg, Bernie Sanders, and Elizabeth Warren. He later expressed support for Joe Biden after he became the nominee. Penn also supported the 2024 presidential election campaign of Democratic presidential candidate Kamala Harris.

During the 2025 New York City Democratic mayoral primary, Penn appeared at rallies for candidate Zohran Mamdani, whose mother Mira Nair directed Penn in The Namesake. Penn later appeared alongside Nair and Mamdani in posts celebrating Diwali during the lead-up to the 2025 New York mayoral election.

=== Other ventures ===
In 2008, Penn served as a visiting lecturer in Asian American Studies at the University of Pennsylvania. His course was titled "Images of Asian Americans in the Media".

In 2014, Penn was working on a graduate certificate in international security from Stanford University.

On January 2, 2017, Penn won the "MasterChef Celebrity Showdown" and donated the $25,000 cash prize to UNRWA, a United Nations relief and human development agency that supports Palestinian refugees. On January 28, 2017, following a racist comment from a user on Penn's Twitter feed, Penn crowd-funded a fundraiser for refugees of the Syrian Civil War and raised $813,533. This occurred during President Donald Trump's Executive Order 13769, which banned immigration to the United States from Syria, Yemen, Sudan, Iran, Iraq, Libya, and Somalia regardless of visa status.

== Personal life ==
Penn is Hindu.

In October 2021, while promoting his memoir, You Can't Be Serious, Penn announced that he and his boyfriend of 11 years, named Josh, were engaged. In regard to his sexual orientation, Penn said that he had "discovered [his] own sexuality relatively late in life compared to many other people." However, he feels that "there's no timeline on this stuff. People figure their shit out at different times in their lives, so I'm glad I did when I did."

== Filmography ==
=== Film ===
Year	Title	Role	Notes
1998	Express: Aisle to Glory	Jackie Newton	
1999	Freshman	Ajay	
2001	American Desi	Ajay Pandya	
2002	Hector	Kendal Cunningham	
2002	Van Wilder	Taj Mahal Badalandabad	
2002	Badger	Sanjay	
2003	Cosmopolitan	Vandana's Fiancé	
2003	Love Don't Cost a Thing	Kenneth Warman	
2003	Malibu's Most Wanted	Hadji	
2003	Dude, Where's the Party?	Mohan "Mo" Bakshi	
2004	Harold & Kumar Go to White Castle	Kumar Patel	
2004	Ball & Chain	Bobby	
2004	Homeland Security	Harrison	
2005	Dancing in Twilight	Sam	
2005	Son of the Mask	Jorge	
2005	A Lot like Love	Jeeter	
2005	Sueño	Raj	
2006	Man About Town	Alan Fineberg	
2006	Bachelor Party Vegas	"Z-Bob"	
2006	The Namesake	Gogol / Nikhil Ganguli	
2006	Superman Returns	Stanford	
2006	Deck the Halls	Amit Sayid	
2006	Van Wilder: The Rise of Taj	Taj Mahal Badalandabad	
2007	Epic Movie	Edward Pervertski	
2008	Harold & Kumar Escape from Guantanamo Bay	Kumar Patel	
2008	Harold & Kumar Go to Amsterdam	Kumar Patel	Video
2011	A Very Harold & Kumar Christmas	Kumar Patel	
2013	Triumph: The Lowell Pomerantz Story	Jordan Tichenor	
2013	Bhopal: A Prayer for Rain	Motwani	
2013	Dementamania	Christian Van Burden	
2014	The Sisterhood of Night	Gordy Gambhir	
2015	The Girl in the Photographs	Peter Hemmings	
2016	Better Off Single	Brice	
2017	Speech & Debate	James	
2017	Once Upon a Time in Venice	Rajeesh	
2017	The Layover	Anuj	
2018	The Ashram	Nitin	
2021	Untitled Horror Movie	Mark	
2022	Smile	Dr. Morgan Desai	
2024	The Underdoggs	Ryan Kauffman	
2024	The Imaginary	Jinzan	Voice; English dub
2026	Trust Me, I'm a Doctor	Sandeep Kapoor	
TBA	What the F*ck Is My Password?	TBA	Post-production
TBA	The Decline of Fucking Western Civilization	TBA	Filming

=== Television ===
Year	Title	Role	Notes
1997	Boy Meets World	Audience Member	Episode: "Quiz Show"
1999	Brookfield	Kumar Zimmerman	TV movie
1999	Buffy the Vampire Slayer	Hunt	Episode: "Beer Bad"
2000	Sabrina the Teenage Witch	Prajeeb	Episode: "You Can't Twin"
2000	Spin City	Buddy	Episode: "The Spanish Prisoner"
2001	Angel	Fez Boy	Episode: "That Vision Thing"
2001	ER	Narajan	Episode: "The Longer You Stay"
2001	NYPD Blue	Solomon Al-Ramai	Episode: "Baby Love"
2001	The Agency	Malek	Episode: "Rules of the Game"
2003	All About the Andersons	Dinesh	Episode: "Pilot"
2003	Tru Calling	Steven	Episode: "Haunted"
2003	The Lonely Island	Fred	Episode: "Regarding Ardy”
2006	The Danny Comden Project	Max	TV movie
2007	Law & Order: Special Victims Unit	Henry Chanoor	Episode: "Outsider"
2007	24	Ahmed Amar	Recurring role (season 6); 4 episodes
2007–2009, 2012	House	Dr. Lawrence Kutner	Main role (seasons 4–5); guest (season 8)
2011–2014	How I Met Your Mother	Kevin	10 episodes
2013	The Big Brain Theory	Host	8 episodes
2013	We Are Men	Gil Bartis	7 episodes
2015	Battle Creek	Detective Fontanelle White	11 episodes
2015	The Big Picture with Kal Penn	Host	12 episodes
2016	New Girl	Tripp	2 episodes
2016	Sanjay and Craig	Greg	Voice, episode: "JJ and Greg"
2016	Deadbeat	Clyde	13 episodes
2016–2019	Designated Survivor	Seth Wright	Main role; 53 episodes
2016–2017	Superhuman	Host	
2018–2021	Fancy Nancy	Mr. Ravi Singh / Mr. Singh	Voice, 3 episodes
2019	The Big Bang Theory	Dr. Kevin Campbell	3 episodes
2019	This Giant Beast That Is the Global Economy	Host	8 episodes
2019	SpongeBob SquarePants	Himself	Episode: "SpongeBob's Big Birthday Blowout"
2019	Sunnyside	Garrett Modi	Main role; also executive producer
2020	Helpsters	Water Wally	Episode: "Basketball Brianna/Heart's Fish"
2020	The Girl in the Woods	AD - Arthur Dean	TV short
2020	Blue's Clues & You!	Himself	Episode: "Happy Birthday, Blue!"
2020	Kal Penn Approves This Message	Host	6 episodes
2020–2021	It's Pony	Fred	Voice, 5 episodes
2020–2022	Mira, Royal Detective	Mikku	Voice, main role
2021	Clarice	Shaan Tripathi	Main role, 10 episodes
2021	PsBattles Live	Himself	Episode: "PsBattles Live: Kal Penn and Kate Flannery"
2021	Hot Mess Holiday	Himself	TV movie; also executive producer
2021	Money Hungry	Host	
2022	American Horror Story: NYC	Mac Marzara	5 episodes
2022	The Santa Clauses	Simon Choksi	Main role
2023	The Daily Show	Guest Host	8 episodes (week of Mar. 13 and Dec. 11)
2023	Scott Pilgrim Takes Off	Lawyer	Voice, episode: "A League of Their Own"
2026	Industry	Jay Jonah Atterbury	3 episodes

=== Video game ===
Year	Title	Role	Notes
2025	Deadpool VR	Carl	

== See also ==
- Gujarati Americans
- Indians in the New York City metropolitan area
- LGBT culture in New York City
- List of LGBT people from New York City
