= Harold & Kumar =

Series of American films (2004–present)

- Directed by: Danny Leiner (1); Jon Hurwitz (2,4); Hayden Schlossberg (2,4); Todd Strauss-Schulson (3)
- Written by: Jon Hurwitz; Hayden Schlossberg; Josh Heald
- Produced by: Greg Shapiro; Jon Hurwitz; Hayden Schlossberg; Josh Heald
- Starring: John Cho; Kal Penn; Neil Patrick Harris
- Cinematography: Bruce Douglas Johnson (1); Daryn Okada (2); Michael Barrett (3)
- Edited by: Jeff Betancourt (1); Jeff Freeman (2); Eric Kissack (3)
- Music by: David Kitay (1); George S. Clinton (2); William Ross (3)
- Distributed by: New Line Cinema; Warner Bros. Pictures
- Release dates: July 30, 2004 (1); April 25, 2008 (2); November 4, 2011 (3)
- Running time: 300 minutes
- Country: United States
- Language: English
- Budget: $40 million
- Box office: $102.8 million

Harold & Kumar is a series of American films created by Jon Hurwitz and Hayden Schlossberg. Beginning with Harold & Kumar Go to White Castle (2004) and followed by Harold & Kumar Escape from Guantanamo Bay (2008) and A Very Harold & Kumar 3D Christmas (2011), the films star John Cho, Kal Penn, and Neil Patrick Harris.

The films are considered buddy stoner comedies, with surreal and animated elements in later sequels. Contrasting ideas and perspectives on life, romance, and maturity feature as recurring themes, while the series is notable for its racially diverse main cast.

The first film was directed by Danny Leiner, the second was directed by creators Hurwitz and Schlossberg, and the third by Todd Strauss-Schulson. The films were distributed by New Line Cinema and Warner Bros. Pictures; the films were produced by Mandate Pictures, Kingsgate Films, Endgame Entertainment, and New Line Cinema. The films chronicle the adventures of Harold Lee (Cho) and Kumar Patel (Penn).

Harold & Kumar has received generally mixed to positive critical reception.

== Films ==
Film	U.S. release date	Director(s)	Screenwriter(s)	Producer(s)	Runtime	Status
Harold & Kumar Go to White Castle	July 30, 2004	Danny Leiner	Jon Hurwitz; Hayden Schlossberg	Nathan Kahane; Greg Shapiro	88 minutes	Released
Harold & Kumar Escape from Guantanamo Bay	April 25, 2008	Jon Hurwitz; Hayden Schlossberg	Jon Hurwitz; Hayden Schlossberg	Nathan Kahane; Greg Shapiro	100 minutes	Released
A Very Harold & Kumar 3D Christmas	November 4, 2011	Todd Strauss-Schulson	Jon Hurwitz; Hayden Schlossberg	Greg Shapiro	89 minutes	Released

=== Harold & Kumar Go to White Castle (2004) ===
Harold Lee and Kumar Patel are two Asian-American (Korean and Indian) stoners who get the munchies and embark on a quest throughout New Jersey for White Castle burgers after seeing them advertised on TV. On their journey, they encounter many obstacles, including a gang of extreme sports punks, a crazed raccoon, a group of Asian nerds, a racist police department, a cheetah that has escaped from a zoo, and an out-of-control Neil Patrick Harris.

=== Harold & Kumar Escape from Guantanamo Bay (2008) ===
Immediately following the events of the first film, Harold and Kumar fly to Amsterdam so Harold can pursue a budding romance with his vacationing neighbor. The pair run into Vanessa Fanning, Kumar's ex-girlfriend, and her fiancé Colton Graham, another old college buddy who helped Harold with getting a job at Brewster-Keagan, at the airport. During the flight, an elderly woman sees Kumar lighting a hand-crafted smokeless bong, and, thinking it is a bomb, screams "Terrorist!". After a confusion of the words "bong" and "bomb", two undercover air marshals tackle Kumar, who accidentally drops the bong on the floor, breaking it and releases what another passenger thinks is poison gas. Harold and Kumar are detained by Ron Fox, a racist Deputy Secretary of Homeland Security, in Washington, D.C., who then sends them to the Guantanamo Bay detention camp. But just as they are about to get sexually assaulted, the neighboring prisoners assault the guards and they are able to escape back to the United States with the help of Cuban boat people they encounter. They meet with their college friend, Raza, who arranges a car for them to travel to Texas in search of Colton, a member of a family who has connections with political officials. On their way to Texas, they encounter various people from an inbred trailer home family to the Ku Klux Klan, to Neil Patrick Harris and George W. Bush.

=== A Very Harold & Kumar 3D Christmas (2011) ===
In April 2009, actor Kal Penn accepted the position of Associate Director of the White House Office of Public Liaison in the Obama administration; when asked if his new job would mean no more Harold & Kumar films, he said, "That's probably true for now."

A new film titled A Very Harold & Kumar Christmas was announced on May 7, 2009. Jon Hurwitz and Hayden Schlossberg returned to write the film while Todd Strauss-Schulson directed. Greg Shapiro returned as producer with Penn and Cho reprising their title roles. Penn left his job at the White House on June 1, 2010, to reprise his role as Kumar in the third Harold & Kumar installment. After filming was completed, Penn returned to the White House.

A Very Harold & Kumar Christmas was released on November 4, 2011, and was the first film in the series to be shown in 3D. Seven years after the events of the first and second films, Harold and Kumar have not spoken in years. The two are reunited and rekindle their friendship after Kumar brings over a package for Harold that arrived at the apartment they used to share. Inside the package is a marijuana joint, which ends up burning down Harold’s father-in-law’s Christmas tree. After an eventful night searching for a replacement, it is revealed that the package was a gift from Santa Claus, intended to help the two become friends again.

=== Future ===
In 2014, it was announced that Adult Swim picked up Harold and Kumar: The Animated Series, and this was confirmed by Kal Penn, David Krumholtz, and Jon Hurwitz. However, it was never produced.

In July 2016, co-star John Cho revealed that he had pitched an idea for a fourth Harold & Kumar and thought there was a chance it might get made. In an interview with Den of Geek!, Cho stated, "I thought of a really great idea, and I pitched it out to the director when we happened to be having dinner one night. And I don't know...I think we're gonna get this made.”

In November 2021, while doing an Instagram Q&A for his new book, Penn was asked whether a fourth film was happening. His response was, "I believe so."

In a November 2023 interview, screenwriters and directors Jon Hurwitz and Hayden Schlossberg said that a fourth film was in development, adding “We’re all talking about making another one. It’s really just a matter of time. It’s figuring out when it could all fit into all of our schedules. It’s something that we’re all determined to do. We just need to find the time to do it.”

In June 2025, the fourth film was officially announced by Lionsgate, with Hurwitz and Schlossberg directing, and writing the screenplay alongside Josh Heald. John Cho and Kal Penn are expected to reprise their roles as Harold Lee and Kumar Patel, but no deal has been reached yet. In March 2026, when asked about the development, Hurwitz replied that he finished some other projects and recently started working on the script.

== Characters ==
=== Harold Lee ===
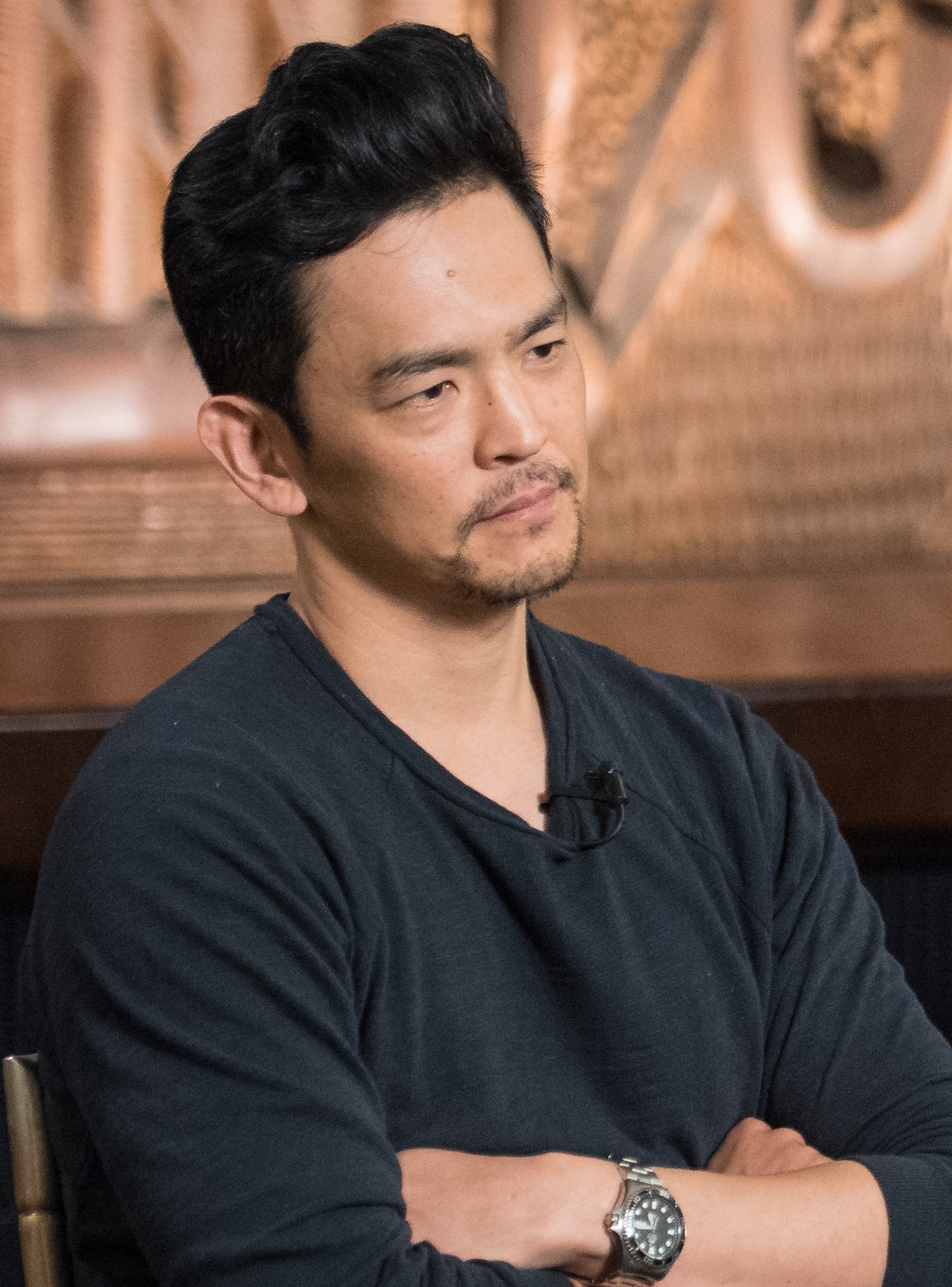
John Cho plays Harold Lee.

Harold is a Korean American investment banker who resides in New Jersey. The character was created by Jon Hurwitz and Hayden Schlossberg and is based upon their real-life friend, named Harold Lee. The character is portrayed by John Cho in all three films.

In Harold & Kumar Go to White Castle, Harold is a hard-working white-collar worker from northern New Jersey. His lazy but intelligent best friend and roommate is Kumar Patel. At times, Harold lets go of his obligations, but only during moments of extreme coercion, to the point where he amazes Kumar. Harold is the yin to Kumar's yang, with the both of them being united through their enjoyment of cannabis smoking after a long day's work and/or leisurely fun (such as aboard an airplane in the sequel, and an after work "Friday night special" in the first film).

Harold's romantic life centers around John Hughes-like fantasies (as is evidenced by his obsession with film classics such as Sixteen Candles). Harold thinks that he will wind up with a similarly repressed Korean-American young woman—Cindy Kim—who isn't as repressed as he thinks. The true object of Harold's desire, however, is Maria Perez (played by Paula Garcés), who lives down the hall from him in his building.

In Harold & Kumar Escape from Guantanamo Bay, when embarking on their trip to Amsterdam they are arrested on the flight there after Kumar tests out his "smokeless bong" in the airplane lavatory. Then the two are sent to Guantanamo Bay where they are involved in a series of comedic events. In one of Kumar's flashbacks, it is revealed that Harold used to be an emo and Kumar was a hard working mathematically proficient nerd in college.

In A Very Harold & Kumar Christmas, Harold is married to Maria and has not spoken to Kumar in years. Harold is a big wig Wall Street investment banker. He owns a lavish house with Maria, and they are trying to start a family. He has trouble impressing his father-in-law, who is enamored with the Christmas holiday.

=== Kumar Patel ===
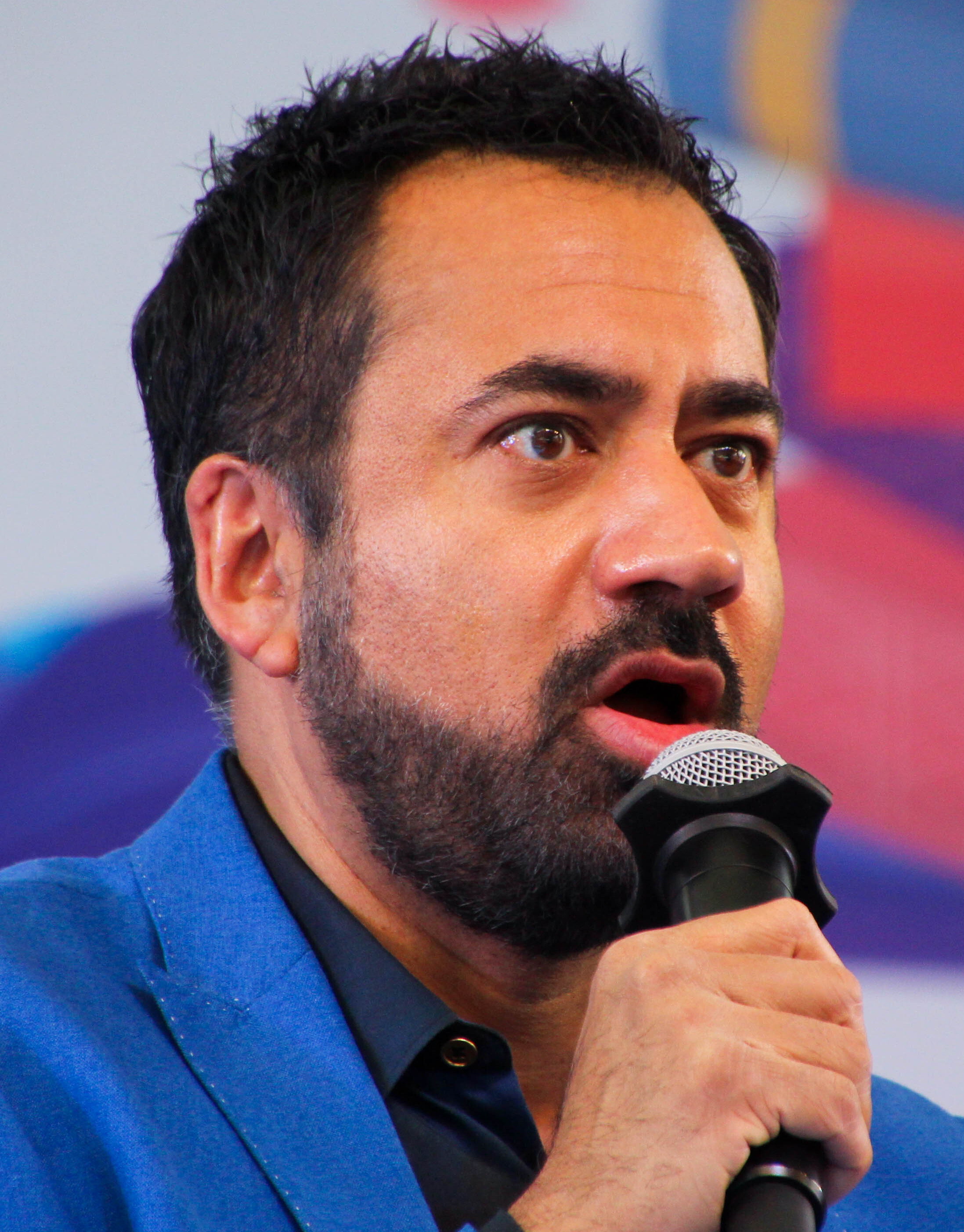
Kal Penn plays Kumar Patel.

Kumar is an Indian American pre-med student residing in New Jersey. His family includes his father and his brother, Saikat Patel. The character was created by Jon Hurwitz and Hayden Schlossberg, and is portrayed by Kal Penn in all three films.

In Harold & Kumar Go to White Castle, Kumar is a 22-year-old college graduate. He shares an apartment with his best friend, Harold. Unlike Harold, Kumar is a fearless, confident slacker who is capable of doing what he wants. Both his father and brother are successful doctors and expect him to follow in their footsteps. Despite his intelligence, including having the ability to perform complex surgeries such as neurosurgery as shown when trying to search for medical marijuana at the hospital his father and brother work at, he is not interested in going to medical school and prefers to smoke marijuana during the night.

In Harold & Kumar Escape from Guantanamo Bay, it is revealed that he had a girlfriend named Vanessa in college, who introduced him to marijuana and transformed him from an aloof geek into the easy-going stoner he is today. She is about to marry the shifty, arrogant frat boy Colton Graham (who disapproves of her marijuana habit), but Kumar interrupts the wedding and wins her back by reciting "Square Root of 3," a math themed love poem that he was afraid to show her in college. Harold, Kumar, and Vanessa then go to Amsterdam to find Maria, Harold's love interest.

In A Very Harold & Kumar Christmas, Kumar has not spoken to Harold in years. Kumar has allowed the apartment to get trashed out, and has let himself go after Vanessa and he break up. Three months later, Vanessa tells Kumar she is pregnant but believes he is too immature to be a father. After a chaotic Christmas night, Kumar tells Vanessa he has matured and is ready to become a father, even offering to return to medical school and give up marijuana. Vanessa gives him another chance, assuring him he does not have to give up his favorite pastime.

=== Neil Patrick Harris ===
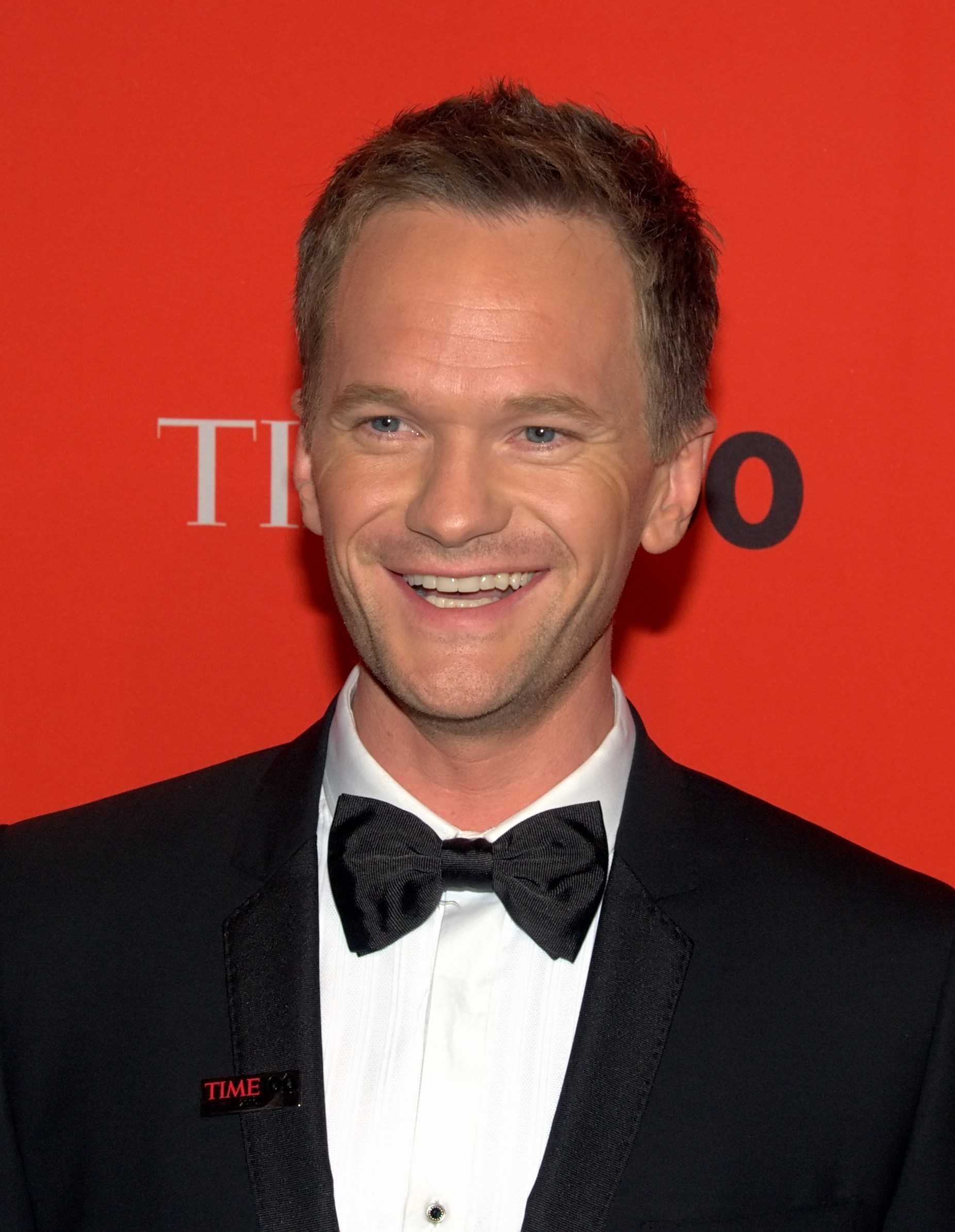
Neil Patrick Harris plays a fictionalized version of himself.

All three films feature Neil Patrick Harris playing a fictionalized version of himself. In the films, Harris is portrayed as a heavy drug user and womanizer, despite being openly gay in real life. Harris didn't publicly come out until 2006, two years after White Castle was released. Although Guantanamo Bay was released two years after Harris came out, his fictional self was still characterized as a womanizer until the third film, when it's revealed that Harris is only pretending to be gay just to have sex with women. His real-life partner, David Burtka, appears as a fictionalized version of himself, who is Harris's drug dealer posing as the latter's life partner.

In a 2008 interview with Ain't It Cool News, Harris revealed that the series's writers were discussing the possibility of a spin-off movie based on his fictional persona.

=== Andy Rosenberg and Seth Goldstein ===
Andy and Seth are two Jewish friends and neighbors of Harold and Kumar portrayed by Eddie Kaye Thomas and David Krumholtz. They decline to go to White Castle with Harold and Kumar as they choose Hot Dog Heaven instead as well as wanting to see Katie Holmes topless in the film The Gift, but in the third movie do go to White Castle.

In the second movie, they are interrogated by U.S. government officials when Harold and Kumar are on the run as mistaken terrorists.

In the third movie, Seth has a son named Christian and stated he had converted to Christianity after marrying his wife, and even wished to uncircumcise himself, all of which aggravated Andy who still practices Judaism. The duo are a homage of Shakespearean characters Rosencrantz and Guildenstern.

=== Maria Perez-Lee ===
Maria is a tenant of Harold and Kumar's apartment played by Paula Garcés in all three films. In the first film, Harold has a crush on Maria but is unable to muster up the courage to talk to her. However, after finally getting White Castle, he finally tells her how he feels and she reciprocates his feelings and they make out in their apartment's elevator. Maria then tells Harold she's going to Amsterdam for ten days and leaves. After sharing this information with Kumar, they decide at the end of the first film to go to Amsterdam and find her.

At the end of the second film, Harold reunites with her in Amsterdam to declare his love to her for which she declares her love back to him.

In the third film, Maria and Harold have been married for years, own a house, and have been struggling to get pregnant. Maria's father (Danny Trejo), visits her and Harold with the rest of her family for Christmas. He does not like Harold, but by the end of the film, he accepts Harold. Maria also happily reveals to Harold that she is pregnant and they are about to start a family.

=== Vanessa Fanning ===
Vanessa, portrayed by Danneel Ackles (then credited as Danneel Harris), is introduced in the second film as Kumar's ex-girlfriend from two years prior. Her wedding is in a week as she is now engaged to Colten, an arrogant man who comes from a very wealthy family. Throughout the film it is shown that Vanessa is unhappy in her relationship with Colten and actually loves Kumar. Through a flashback, it is shown that Vanessa introduced Kumar to marijuana in college. After Colten betrays them, Harold and Kumar crash Vanessa's wedding so Kumar can tell her how Colten betrayed them and profess his love to her. After Colten attacks Harold but is knocked down, Vanessa tells Kumar how embarrassed she is they ruined her wedding. Kumar, trying to doing something even more embarrassing, recites a poem he wrote in college that he was always too ashamed to show her. She smiles and they leave the wedding together a couple, flying out for Amsterdam to help Harold find Maria.

In the third film, it is revealed that Vanessa left Kumar three months prior due to his immaturity and childishness. Later, she reveals she's pregnant with Kumar's child. After Kumar reacts childishly, she decides to cut him out of her life. However, at the end of the movie, Kumar tells Vanessa that he's finally ready to grow up and is ready to be an adult and they get back together, ready to start a family of their own.

== Reception ==
=== Box office performance ===
Film	Release date	Box office revenue			Domestic box office ranking		Budget	Reference
Film	Release date	United States	Foreign	Worldwide	Weekly	Annual	Budget	Reference
Harold & Kumar Go to White Castle	July 30, 2004	$18,250,550 (76.2%)	$5,686,358 (23.8%)	$23,936,908	#7	#110	$9,000,000	
Harold & Kumar Escape from Guantanamo Bay	April 25, 2008	$38,108,728 (87.6%)	$5,384,395 (12.4%)	$43,493,123	#2	#75	$12,000,000	
A Very Harold & Kumar Christmas	November 4, 2011	$35,061,031 (96.1%)	$1,131,744 (3.1%)	$36,192,775	#3	#91	$19,000,000	
Total		$91,420,309	$12,202,497	$103,622,806			$40,000,000	

=== Home media ===
DVD and Blu-ray sales in the United States
Film	Release date	Units sold	Sales revenue	Chart ranking	Reference
Harold & Kumar Go to White Castle	January 4, 2005	2,878,770	$30,609,751	#16	
Harold & Kumar Escape from Guantanamo Bay	July 29, 2008	1,231,397	$30,405,684	#1	
A Very Harold & Kumar Christmas	February 7, 2012	607,330	$11,939,594	#3	
Total		4,717,497	$72,955,029		

=== Critical reception ===
Film	Rotten Tomatoes	Metacritic	CinemaScore
Harold & Kumar Go to White Castle	74% (148 reviews)	64 (29 reviews)	B+
Harold & Kumar Escape from Guantanamo Bay	52% (135 reviews)	57 (27 reviews)	A−
A Very Harold & Kumar Christmas	68% (131 reviews)	61 (29 reviews)	B
