= Silent Retreat =

Upcoming film by Todd Strauss-Schulson

- Directed by: Todd Strauss-Schulson
- Written by: Todd Strauss-Schulson; Matthew Fogel
- Starring: Isabella Rossellini; Dennis Haysbert; Jack Whitehall
- Cinematography: Sing Howe Yam
- Edited by: Spencer Houck
- Production company: Miramax
- Country: United States
- Language: English

Silent Retreat is an upcoming American romantic comedy film directed by Todd Strauss-Schulson which he co-wrote with Matthew Fogel. It stars Isabella Rossellini, Dennis Haysbert, and Jack Whitehall.

== Premise ==
A couple experiencing relationship difficulties decide to attend a three-day meditation retreat that requires total silence. They are accompanied by the man's best friend and his recently widowed mother, and the enforced quiet brings their unresolved tensions to the surface.

== Cast ==
- Isabella Rossellini as Michelle Keaton
- Dennis Haysbert as Josh Alpert
- Jack Whitehall as Thomas
- Larry Owens as Eric
- Sarah Goldberg as Gillian
- Lorraine Toussaint as Wanda
- George Basil as Duncan

== Production ==
Filming began in Troy, New York on August 30, 2019. Filming also occurred in Kingston, New York in September 2019. In January 2020, it was announced that Rossellini had completed her scenes in the film.
