= A Very Harold & Kumar 3D Christmas =

2011 film by Todd Strauss-Schulson

- Theatrical release poster
- Directed by: Todd Strauss-Schulson
- Written by: Jon Hurwitz; Hayden Schlossberg
- Produced by: Greg Shapiro
- Starring: John Cho; Kal Penn; Neil Patrick Harris
- Cinematography: Michael Barrett
- Edited by: Eric Kissack
- Music by: William Ross
- Production companies: New Line Cinema; Mandate Pictures; Kingsgate Films
- Distributed by: Warner Bros. Pictures
- Release date: November 4, 2011
- Running time: 89 minutes
- Country: United States
- Language: English
- Budget: $19 million
- Box office: $36.2 million

A Very Harold & Kumar 3D Christmas is a 2011 American buddy stoner Christmas comedy film directed by Todd Strauss-Schulson and written by Jon Hurwitz and Hayden Schlossberg. The sequel to Harold & Kumar Escape from Guantanamo Bay (2008), it is the third installment in the Harold & Kumar franchise, and stars John Cho, Kal Penn, and Neil Patrick Harris. The film follows estranged friends Harold Lee (Cho) and Kumar Patel (Penn) as they reunite to hunt for a Christmas tree.

Preparations for the film began in May 2009, with Hurwitz, Schlossberg, and Strauss-Schulson signing soon thereafter. Cho, Harris, and Penn returned by June 2010, with the latter departing his role in the U.S. Office of Public Liaison to reprise his role in A Very Harold & Kumar 3D Christmas. Principal photography began later that month and lasted until that August, with filming locations including Detroit, Los Angeles, and New York City. Its marketing campaign used guerilla tactics led by Cho and Penn to promote the film's 3D and animated elements, a new for the franchise.

A Very Harold & Kumar 3D Christmas was theatrically released in the United States on November 4, 2011, by Warner Bros. Pictures. The film received generally positive critical reception.

== Plot ==
Six years after escaping from Guantanamo Bay detention camp, and two years since they have last spoken, best friends and roommates Harold Lee and Kumar Patel have gone their separate ways.

Harold has become a successful businessman on Wall Street and married his Latina girlfriend Maria, but has given up smoking cannabis for fear it is making him infertile. Meanwhile, Kumar still lives in the apartment he once shared with Harold after getting kicked out of medical school for failing a drug test, and has recently been dumped again by his girlfriend Vanessa, who tells him she is pregnant with his child.

Maria and Harold invite Maria's relatives to their house for Christmas, including Maria's father Mr. Perez, who does not like Harold. Mr. Perez brings his prized Fraser fir Christmas tree that he has been growing for eight years and emphasizes its importance to his family. Harold promises to decorate it while Maria and her relatives spend time together downtown.

Kumar receives a package with Harold's name on it at his apartment and reluctantly decides to deliver it to Harold. At Harold's house, they discover the item inside to be a large marijuana joint. Kumar lights the joint, but Harold throws it out of the window, only for it to magically land in the tree and burn it down. Unable to purchase a new one, Kumar tells Harold that his neighbor, Adrian, is attending a party that has a Fraser fir and promises to help Harold retrieve it.

Harold, Kumar, Adrian, and Todd (Harold's new best friend) arrive at the party, where a girl named Mary has invited Adrian to take her virginity. She is revealed to be the daughter of the overprotective Ukrainian mafia kingpin Sergei Katsov. Harold and Kumar have their drinks spiked; Katsov eventually arrives and orders two of his henchmen to kill the pair, believing that they were trying to rape his daughter.

The duo make it out of the building empty-handed, and then hallucinate becoming clay stop-motion characters being chased by a nightmarish version of Frosty the Snowman. They recover and then briefly reunite with their old friends, Rosenberg and Goldstein. Harold and Kumar plan to steal a tree from a church, but end up participating in a Christmas show rehearsal featuring Neil Patrick Harris, who they believed was killed after being shot outside a Texas whorehouse six years ago. Harris reveals that he did die, but Jesus Christ kicked him out of Heaven. Harris hooks the pair up with a Christmas tree and a Wafflebot, a dangerous AI-controlled waffle-making toy, before sending them off.

As the pair head back towards Harold's house, they are kidnapped by Katsov's two henchmen and then saved by Wafflebot. Lost and empty-handed again, Harold fires the henchmen's shotgun into the air hoping to signal for help; he accidentally shoots Santa Claus in the head, forcing Kumar to perform emergency surgery. In exchange for saving his life, Santa offers to fly them back home in his sleigh, and reveals that he sent the package to reunite the pair. Harold arrives home to encounter Mr. Perez, who is enraged to see that his Christmas tree is missing. Harold finally stands up to him and earns his father-in-law's respect.

Harold and Kumar rekindle their friendship, Kumar and Vanessa rekindle their romance, and Kumar promises that he will re-take his exams. Maria discovers that she is pregnant on Christmas morning and the family discovers Santa left a replacement tree in the living room. Harold and Kumar share a joint as Santa flies overhead smoking a bong, wishing everyone a merry Christmas.

== Cast ==
- John Cho as Harold Lee
- Kal Penn as Kumar Patel
- Neil Patrick Harris as a fictionalized version of himself
- Paula Garcés as Maria Perez-Lee, Harold's wife
- Danneel Harris as Vanessa Fanning, Kumar's girlfriend
- Tom Lennon as Todd
- Danny Trejo as Carlos Perez, Maria's father
- Elias Koteas as Sergei Katsov
- Eddie Kaye Thomas as Andy Rosenberg
- David Krumholtz as Seth Goldstein
- Amir Blumenfeld as Adrian
- Patton Oswalt as Larry Juston / Mall Santa
- Richard Riehle as Santa Claus
- Jordan Hinson as Mary Katsov, Sergei's daughter and Adrian's love interest
- John Hoogenakker as Gustav, Sergei's henchman
- Jake Johnson as Jesus
- Bobby Lee as Kenneth Park
- Yasen Peyankov as Yuri, Sergei's other henchman
- Melissa Gaston as Gracie
- RZA as Lamar
- Da'Vone McDonald as Latrell
- Brett Gelman as TV Director
- Dana DeLorenzo as Becca
- David Burtka as a fictionalized version of himself
- Dan Levy as Reporter

== Production ==
In April 2009, Kal Penn accepted a position in the Obama administration as associate director of the White House Office of Public Liaison. When asked if his new job would mean no more Harold and Kumar films, he said, "That's probably true for now." However, A Very Harold & Kumar Christmas was announced on May 7, 2009, for release on November 5, 2010, at the earliest and possibly deferred to the 2011 holiday season. Jon Hurwitz and Hayden Schlossberg returned to write the film while Todd Strauss-Schulson directed and Greg Shapiro returned as producer. Penn left his job with the White House on June 1, 2010, to reprise his role as Kumar in the third Harold & Kumar installment.

Filming took place in Detroit, Los Angeles, and New York City from June to August 2010, with the use of Panavision Genesis HD and Element Technica 3D Rig. The film was released in RealD 3D on November 4, 2011. Animators from Laika created the clay animation scene.

After filming was completed, Penn returned to the White House. Cho and Penn went on a tour to promote the film in different college towns. At each stop they had a bus hand out "munchies".

== Reception ==
=== Box office ===
During its first weekend, the film opened at third place behind Puss in Boots and Tower Heist, grossing $13 million, below its prediction of $18 million. At the end of its box office run, the film earned a total of $35.4 million, against a budget of $19 million.

=== Critical response ===
On Rotten Tomatoes, the film has an approval rating of 69%, based on 127 reviews, with a rating average of 6.2/10. The site's critical consensus reads, "Still raunchy, still irreverent, and still hit-and-miss, this Harold & Kumar outing also has a Christmas miracle: The audience gets to see the sweeter side of the duo." Metacritic, which assigns a weighted average score to reviews from mainstream critics, gives the film a score of 61 out of 100, based on 29 critics, indicating "generally favorable" reviews. CinemaScore polls reported that the average grade moviegoers gave the film was a "B" on an A+ to F scale.

Roger Ebert of the Chicago Sun-Times gave the film 2.5 out of 4 stars, saying "It's not that I was particularly offended; it's that I didn't laugh very much." Justin Chang of Variety wrote: "This vulgar romp is a generally harmless, heartwarming affair, a cinematic Christmas cookie almost sweet and flaky enough to cover the fact that it's laced with hash, cocaine and assorted bodily fluids, blood included." Kirk Honeycutt of The Hollywood Reporter called it "A mildly diverting naughty comedy, lacking the pure comic nastiness of Bad Santa or the sheer audacity of Up in Smoke."

=== Home media ===
A Very Harold & Kumar 3D Christmas was released on DVD and Blu-ray Disc on February 7, 2012. The film was released on Blu-ray Disc in two versions: firstly, Single-Disc Blu-ray and DVD combo and secondly, Movie-Only Edition. As of February 3, 2015, the film has sold 607,330 video discs, including 447,288 DVDs and 160,042 Blu-ray Discs, giving a gross of $6,649,425 and $4,855,462 respectively, for a total gross of $11,504,887 in North America.

=== Accolades ===
Composer William Ross received a nomination for Best Original Score for a Comedy Film at the 2011 International Film Music Critics Association Awards.

== See also ==
- List of Christmas films
- Santa Claus in film
- Stoner films
