= Harold & Kumar Escape from Guantanamo Bay =

2008 film by Jon Hurwitz & Hayden Schlossberg

- Theatrical release poster
- Directed by: Jon Hurwitz; Hayden Schlossberg
- Written by: Jon Hurwitz; Hayden Schlossberg
- Produced by: Nathan Kahane; Greg Shapiro
- Starring: John Cho; Kal Penn; Rob Corddry; Roger Bart; Neil Patrick Harris
- Cinematography: Daryn Okada
- Edited by: Jeff Freeman
- Music by: George S. Clinton
- Production companies: New Line Cinema; Mandate Pictures; Kingsgate Films
- Distributed by: Warner Bros. Pictures
- Release date: April 25, 2008
- Running time: 100 minutes
- Country: United States
- Language: English
- Budget: $12 million
- Box office: $43.4 million

Harold & Kumar Escape from Guantanamo Bay is a 2008 American buddy stoner comedy film written and directed by Jon Hurwitz and Hayden Schlossberg. The sequel to Harold & Kumar Go to White Castle (2004), is the second installment in the Harold & Kumar franchise, and stars John Cho, Kal Penn, Rob Corddry, Roger Bart, and Neil Patrick Harris. The film follows Harold Lee (Cho) and Kumar Patel (Penn) as their planned trip to Amsterdam is derailed after being wrongly imprisoned at Guantanamo Bay detention camp.

Originally considered a direct-to-video release, Hurwitz and Schlossberg signed on for the film by January 2007, with Cho, Penn, and Harris returning soon after. Principal photography also began that month and concluded in March 2007, with filming locations including Shreveport and Amsterdam. Prior to release, the film faced backlash for its comedic portrayal of Guantanamo Bay, with Amnesty International mounting a campaign to highlight the testimonies of abuse and torture made by the camp's detainees.

Harold & Kumar Escape from Guantanamo Bay was theatrically released in the U.S. on April 25, 2008, by Warner Bros. Pictures, the first New Line Cinema title released after the studio's transition by Warner Bros. The film received mixed critical reception, with praise for the performances of Cho, Penn, and Harris, although some found it inferior to its predecessor. Conversely, the film was better received by audiences, and has gained a cult following. It was also a commercial success, grossing over $43 million worldwide. The sequel, A Very Harold & Kumar 3D Christmas, was released internationally in November 2011.

== Plot ==
After returning home from White Castle, Harold Lee and Kumar Patel decide to travel to Amsterdam, Netherlands so Harold can surprise his neighbor and love interest Maria as well as smoke cannabis. At the airport, the duo encounters Kumar's ex-girlfriend Vanessa Fanning, who is engaged to Colton Graham, a college friend of Harold's whose family has political connections.

On the plane, passengers mistake Kumar's smokeless bong for a bomb and sky marshals apprehend the duo. Ron Fox, an unhinged and extremely racist Deputy Secretary of Homeland Security, immediately jumps to the false conclusion that the duo are agents of a joint Al-Qaeda and North Korean conspiracy and sends them to the Guantanamo Bay detention camp in Cuba against the advice of NSA Deputy Director Dr. John Beecher.

After narrowly avoiding getting sexually assaulted by a guard at the detention camp, Harold and Kumar escape and board a Cuban refugee boat to Miami. They meet up with their college friend Raza at his home, who loans them a car so they can drive to Texas, hoping Colton can help clear their names.

Harold and Kumar endure several misadventures on their way to Texas, first crashing their car into an African-American neighborhood in Birmingham, Alabama, staying at the home of an incestuous sibling couple and their inbred son, and escaping a Ku Klux Klan rally. Meanwhile, Fox tries to find them through several racist interrogation techniques.

As Harold and Kumar hitchhike through a wooded area, they are picked up by Neil Patrick Harris, who manages to get them through a checkpoint set up by Fox, but then takes them to a brothel, where the mistress then shoots Harris for branding one of the prostitutes. When Harold and Kumar reach Texas, Colton agrees to help exonerate the duo. However, upon seeing Kumar reconnect with Vanessa, Colton instead delivers Harold and Kumar to Fox.

On the flight back to prison, Harold and Kumar manage to subdue Fox's men with a can of mace belonging to Harris and their fists, but Fox holds them at gunpoint, until an enraged Beecher intervenes, telling Fox that it is because of people like him that the rest of the world thinks Americans are racist and stupid.

Beecher promises to get Harold and Kumar cleared, but trips and accidentally opens the cabin door, sucking everyone out, including himself. Harold manages to grab a parachute and he pulls it open for him and Kumar just as Fox falls by to his death, having jumped after them (without a parachute) to finish them off.

Harold and Kumar land through the roof of a luxurious ranch house, which turns out to be President George W. Bush's estate. After befriending and smoking kush with Harold and Kumar, the duo explains their misadventures and Bush gives them both a presidential pardon, and also gets the Secret Service to escort them to Vanessa and Colton's wedding.

They expose Colton's betrayal to Vanessa and the guests, as Colton attempts to attack them, but Harold knocks him out. Kumar consoles a furious Vanessa by reciting a poem he wrote for her in college, and they reconcile.

Harold, Kumar and Vanessa then travel to Amsterdam where Harold finds Maria, and the couples happily tour the city together while getting high on cannabis. A post-credits scene shows Harris coming to after being presumed dead outside the brothel.

== Cast ==
- John Cho as Harold Lee, a Korean-American stoner and investment banker; Kumar Patel's best friend and roommate
- Kal Penn as Kumar Patel, an Indian-American stoner and medical student; Harold Lee's best friend and roommate
- Rob Corddry as Ron Fox, an extremely racist U.S. Deputy Secretary of Homeland Security who dedicates himself to harassing Harold and Kumar despite learning their true backgrounds.
- Roger Bart as Dr. John Beecher, a compassionate Deputy Director of the NSA who disagrees with Fox's methods.
- Danneel Harris as Vanessa Fanning, Kumar's love interest.
- Neil Patrick Harris as a fictionalized, drug-addled, whoremongering version of himself.
- David Krumholtz as Seth Goldstein
- Eddie Kaye Thomas as Andy Rosenberg
- Jack Conley as Deputy Frye
- Paula Garces as Maria, Harold's love interest.
- Eric Winter as Colton Graham, Vanessa's fiancé.
- Amir Talai as Raza Syed, a college friend of Harold and Kumar living in Miami
- Reverend Clyde Stanky as Grand Wizard
- Richard Christy as Kenny
- Clyde Kusatsu as Mr. Lee
- Beverly D'Angelo as Sally
- Jon Reep as Raymus
- Ed Helms as Interpreter
- Adam Herschman as Archie
- Ava Santana as Tammi
- Randal Reeder as Robert "Big Bob" Clemens
- James Adomian as a fictionalized, drug-addicted and womanizing version of George W. Bush
- Errol Sitahal as Dr. Patel, Kumar's father
- Echo Valley as Tits Hemmingway
- Missi Pyle as Raylene
- Wilbur Fitzgerald as Colton's father
- Jason Konopisos as Lt. Derek Davis
- Alec Rayme as Terrorist

== Soundtrack ==
Harold and Kumar Escape from Guantanamo Bay - Soundtrack

Soundtrack album by Various Artists
- Released: March 23, 2008
- Label: Lakeshore Records

Harold & Kumar Escape from Guantanamo Bay: Original Soundtrack was released on April 15, 2008. It contains 13 songs used in the film.

Track list

1. "Ooh Wee (Remix)" – Mark Ronson featuring Nate Dogg, Ghostface Killah, Trife, and Saigon
2. "My Dick" – Mickey Avalon
3. "Cappuccino" – The Knux
4. "Check Yo Self (The Message Remix)" – Ice Cube
5. "My Stoney Baby" – 311
6. "Chinese Baby" – Viva la Union*
7. "Nothin' But a Good Time" – Poison
8. "Pussy (Real Good)" – Jacki-O
9. "It's So Hard to Say Goodbye to Yesterday" – Boyz II Men
10. "In the Beginning" – K'Naan
11. "Gospel Weed Song" – Bizarre
12. "All That I Want" – Curtis Murphy Syndicate
13. "The Merkin Medley" – George S. Clinton
14. "I Love My Sex" – Benny Benassi

Songs that appear in the film, but are not on the soundtrack album, include:

1. "Whiplash" – Metallica
2. "Something About That Woman" – Lakeside
3. "I Love Ganja" – Rastaman Ivan
4. "Sippin' on Dat" – Victor Rubio
5. "The Donque Song" – will.i.am featuring Snoop Dogg
6. "Mr. Shadowmaker" – Jeff Cardoni
7. "Toca Me Lo" – Lucci & Cruz
8. "Fooled Around and Fell in Love" – Elvin Bishop
9. "Pussy Ass Bitch" – Transcenders
10. "Danger Zone" – Kenny Loggins
11. "Hey Joe" – Jimi Hendrix
12. "Heaven Is a Place on Earth" – Belinda Carlisle
13. "I've Been Around Too Long" – Marmalade
14. "Stick It" – Great White
15. "What A Wonderful World" – Louis Armstrong
- John Cho (Harold) is the lead singer of Viva la Union and wrote the song "Chinese Baby" from this soundtrack.

== Production ==
=== Development ===
Hurwitz and Schlossberg—who wrote the original Harold & Kumar Go to White Castle—were this time around at the helm as directors and writers for the follow-up from their original script, replacing the first film's director Danny Leiner and making their feature directorial debut at the same time as well. On January 31, 2007, The Hollywood Reporter announced that David Krumholtz, Neil Patrick Harris, Rob Corddry, Christopher Meloni, Ed Helms, Eddie Kaye Thomas, Paula Garces, Jack Conley, Roger Bart, Danneel Harris, and Eric Winter will join John Cho and Kal Penn in Harold & Kumar 2.

=== Filming ===
Filming began in the third week of January 2007 in Shreveport, Louisiana. Filming concluded in March 2007, after which Kal Penn was able to start guest teaching some courses at University of Pennsylvania for their Spring 2008 semester.

=== Post-production ===
Warner Bros. Pictures' spokesman said that this film was originally produced as a direct-to-video film until a decision was made to release it theatrically.

The film cost $12 million to make.

=== Promotion ===
In October 2007, a "coming soon" poster featuring Neil Patrick Harris began circulating on the Internet. Showing Harris astride a unicorn, the advertisement poses the question "What would NPH do?"

== Reception ==
=== Critical response ===
The review aggregator Rotten Tomatoes reported an approval rating of 53% based on 133 reviews, with an average rating of 5.8/10. The site's critical consensus reads, "It may not equal its predecessor, but Harold and Kumar Escape from Guantanamo Bay is still good for some laughs -- and food for thought." Metacritic reported the film had an average weighted score of 57 out of 100, based on 27 critics, indicating "mixed or average" reviews". Audiences polled by CinemaScore gave the film an average grade of "A−" on an A+ to F scale.

Variety declared it "Animal House meets Dr. Strangelove" and called it "one of the ballsiest comedies to come out of Hollywood in a long time." The Guardian (which rated the movie 7 out of 10) noted that despite having a "total nonsense" story, its screening was "one of the most raucous screenings I've ever attended. Even the opening credits were wildly applauded, and much of the dialog was inaudible over the laughter."

Conversely, Richard Roeper of the Chicago Sun-Times lamented that although he enjoyed the "pot-fueled laughs and the sheer energetic lunacy of the original, I was really let down by this uninspired sequel." Joe Neumaier of the New York Daily News said that "the movie forgets to stay true to their characters or to itself." Michael Phillips, also of the Chicago Tribune, wrote that you "find yourself smiling at some of the bits, wincing through many, many others, and ultimately wondering if the pacing would've improved had either H or K developed a terrible cocaine habit." Amnesty International USA commented by saying that "Guantanamo is no joke." They have encouraged their membership to hand out fliers at movie theater screenings to promote awareness about the treatment of detainees at the Guantanamo Bay detention camp.

=== Box office ===
In its opening weekend, the film grossed $14.9 million in 2,510 theaters, in the United States and Canada, averaging $5,939 per theater and ranking #2 at the box office behind Baby Mama. The film performed much better at the box office than its predecessor which grossed $23.9 million worldwide after opening at #7 in the United States and Canada with $5.4 million.

Its international theatrical gross amounted to $43,495,888. The film went on to gross $30,395,809 in DVD sales.

== Home media ==
The film was released on DVD and Blu-ray Disc July 29, 2008 featuring a single-disc theatrical edition, an unrated edition, or a 2-disc unrated edition. The unrated edition was featured for Blu-ray disc. The 2-disc version features a "dude change the movie" feature which lets the viewer access alternate scenes and an alternate ending including "Harold & Kumar Go to Amsterdam".

== Sequel ==
Kal Penn and John Cho returned in their title roles in A Very Harold & Kumar 3D Christmas. Danneel Harris reprised her role of Vanessa and Paula Garces returned as Maria. Neil Patrick Harris also returned for a cameo in this sequel. Eddie Kaye Thomas and Bobby Lee also reprised their roles from the previous films. A Very Harold & Kumar Christmas was released on November 4, 2011.

== See also ==
- List of cultural references to the September 11 attacks
