= D.A. Pursuit of Justice =

- Developer: Legacy Software
- Publisher: Legacy Software
- Director: Richard Marshall
- Producers: Gregg Ackerman; Paul Childs; Ariella Lehrer
- Artists: Adam Kane; Jeff Pedersen
- Writers: Max Stanley, Loren Naiman
- Composer: Brett Tuggle
- Platform: Windows
- Release: Q3 1997 (separately); September 1997 (bundle); October 24, 2001 (remake)
- Genre: Adventure
- Mode: Single-player

D.A. Pursuit of Justice is a three-part video game series based around a criminal lawyer who is trying to convict guilty people. The three individual cases were sold separately or also as a three-case 8-CD bundle published by Alpha Software, shipped on September 15, 1997. The game is part of Legacy Software's RealPlay Series.

== Gameplay ==
The player is a prosecuting attorney to needs to successfully present their case in court to win the trial and put the criminal behind bars. The gameplay consists of two sections: pre-trial and trial. The pre-trial phase sees the player collect evidence over four days - this can include police reports, witness interrogations, line-ups, jail snitch testimony, and physical evidence. The player puts their evidence into the Case Constructor, where they need to prove each element of the case. The trial phase sees the player put their witnesses on the stand, object to the defending lawyer's unacceptable questions, and citing criminal codes when the defending lawyer tries to poke holes in the argument.

The game encourages players to cultivate their problem solving, strategy, and analysis skills.

== Development ==
=== Design and release ===
According to Talk Visual Corporation, the company was formed by the merger of Legacy Software with Videocall, Prior to the game's release, Gregg Ackerman of the AckermanBenson advertising production company joined Legacy Software, and he would become the title's executive producer. Of D.A. Pursuit of Justice he said: "We didn't intend this to be a graduate course in law" but that he wanted players to learn that "it's not easy being a lawyer." According to the credit.txt included on the game discs, writing and legal consultation was provided by Deputy District Attorney Loren Naiman.

Windows 95 CD-ROM game included interactive screens, full-motion video, and 16-bit color. The game had 500 pages (equivalent to two feature films), fifty-seven principal actors, 20 sets, six screenwriters, and took a year to complete. It was filmed on the streets of Los Angeles over a period of three weeks. The game saw the first use of the "Microsoft Designed for Windows 95" Logo. The game uses Microsoft DirectX 3 technology. A school edition was also made available. The three cases were collectively Alpha Interactive's second game in their "RealPlay" series, after the medical simulator title EmergencyRoom. This series aimed to "intertwine high intensity gameplay with simulated career experience".

The developers teamed up with crime-themed television network Court TV (currently known as TruTV) to create the spin-off game Legal Pursuit, to build consumer awareness. The game was featured on Court TV's website, and was later included in the bundle version of the game. It was also available on the Legacy Software website. D.A. Pursuit of Justice: The Rat Tattoo Murder was offered as a prize for an Arizona Republic-run competition. Legacy employee Lisa Stein presented and previewed the game at the 1997 E3 gaming expo. In collaboration with public interest law firm Public Counsel as part of their School-Linked Legal Assistance Program, The Sunset Boulevard Deuce was used as an education tool in North Hollywood and Los Angeles high schools to teach them about drink-driving. The program was led by Public Counsel attorney Andrea Ramos, and Legacy Software president Ariella Lehrer (who is also a cognitive psychologist). The game is unique for offering California attorneys MCLE credit, being equivalent to 18 units of continuing education credit at the State Bar of California. Of the 2001 re-release, Legacy Interactive CEO Ariella Lehrer said "Our customers like fast-paced excitement and thrills, but also real-life scenarios and problem-solving situations that challenge the mind more than the trigger finger".

In October 1996, Alpha Interactive anticipated the game would be released in the first quarter of 1997. The fourth quarter of 1996 saw Legacy Software and IBM mutually decide to terminate the D.A. Pursuit of Justice "DA License Agreement"; Legacy paid IBM $400,000 to obtain their rights, which would be effective January 3, 1997. In March, Alpha Interactive signed a contract with EduCorp, on the basis that their market research told them that the title would achieve synergy with the customer base and distribution reach of EduCorp. On March 17, 1997, it was announced that Legacy had terminated an agreement with IBM for co-publishing the title. An exclusive distribution contract was signed with Alpha Software Corporation on August 7, 1997.

=== Commercial performance ===
D.A. Pursuit of Justice was commercially unsuccessful. The game absorbed $859,424 in company resources during 1998 alone. Legacy began its exit from the game industry in June 1997, and continued to do so through 1998.

In August 1997, it was announced the title and Emergency Room Intern would be distributed through their network of 5,000 US retailers in September of that year. In early September it was announced the game would be published on the 15th of that month. By December 15, 1997 the Company was unable to make the payment to IBM so a compromise involving royalties to other titles was reached. In 1998, BTI and Legacy signed a contract which stipulated they would "pursue joint venture programs" for the development and distribution of four titles, including this game. Financed through BTI, Legacy planned to complete released the three remaining cases of the project, with the potential for it to become as evergreen title, with new cases constantly being released in subsequent years. In May of that year, Legacy announced it had terminated its merger negotiation, and that Legacy would instead agree to acquire BTI, and that the two companies were still looking to raise money to further develop this game. But these plans were ultimately abandoned, and the remaining three cases have not been released. On March 26, 1998, Legacy Interactive announced the formation of two Limited Liability Companies, for the purpose of developing and marketing new titles in their RealPlay series: Emergency Room Deluxe and D.A. Pursuit of Justice. On May 19, it was announced the company received two private placements from DK Trust and Black Tusk Interactive.

In the three months ended September 30, 1998, D.A. Pursuit of Justice experienced a decrease in sales. A charge of $600,000 was provided to the developers for product development costs, based on the reduced forecasted sales of the CD-ROM version of the title. The company was also in talks with third parties about developing and marketing a DVD version of the game. 1998 report indicated that the title had generated revenue that was lower than expected, and led to the company generated losses, leading Legacy to terminate its distribution agreement with Alpha Soft effective December 31, 1998. Distributed by Activision, a version of the game was available in retail stores throughout the US and Canada on October 1, 2001. ЗАО "Новый Диск" has the exclusive rights to localize, publish and distribute the game in Russia, CIS and Baltic countries, and is yet to act on those rights.

== Release ==
There were originally supposed to be six cases. Three were released.

- Case 1: The Sunset Boulevard Deuce
- Case 2: The Gatsby Diamond Jewelry Theft
- Case 3: The Rat Tattoo Murder
- Case 4: The Beverly Hills Burglary (unreleased)
- Case 5: The Orange Grove Teenage Arson (unreleased)
- Case 6: The Murder at the Bordeaux Motel (unreleased)

== Critical reception ==
Reception

Aggregate score
Aggregator	Score
GameRankings	65.40% (Remake)

Review scores
Publication	Score
Computer Simulation Games	3/5
The Adrenaline Vault	4.5/5
Computer Gaming World (#159, Oct 1997)	40/100
PC Gamer	70/100
Doupe.cz	4/10
Adventure Point	3.5/5
Just Adventure	C+
Gaming Illustrated	60.0%
GameZone	7.9
Game Vortex	4/10
Game Center	8/10
United Gamers Online	88%
Allgame	2.5/5

Awards
Publication	Award
Games Magazine	Best New Simulation
Technology and Learning Magazine	Best Home Learning Software Award

GameGuru noted that while the game was enjoyable, it wasn't for everyone and could be boring for players used to more fast-paced gameplay. The Adrenaline Vault noted that the subject matter was ripe for a video game, due to the recent TV landscape that included: L.A. Law, Law and Order, The Practice, People's Court, and Judge Judy. Games Domain gave mixed reviews to all three titles, making a special mention of the limited time the player has to collect evidence. PC Mag recommended both the game and Emergency: Code Red to players who wanted realistic simulations of those industries. Julie Strasberg of Game Power, HomePC and Gameboomers called the game both compelling and entertaining. AllAboutGames noted that the player's score is never revealed to the player until the end of their game, maintaining an element of surprise. PC World felt that while the game was realistic, it was not afast-moving and concluded by saying "caveat emptor".
