= Hayden Schlossberg =

American screenwriter and director

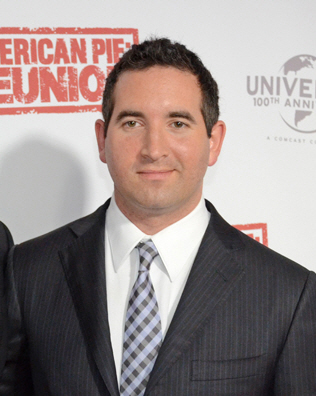
- Schlossberg at the American Reunion premiere in 2012
- Born: June 9, 1978 (age 48); Livingston, New Jersey, U.S.
- Education: University of Chicago
- Occupations: screenwriter, director, producer
- Known for: Cobra Kai; Harold & Kumar

Hayden Schlossberg (born June 9, 1978) is an American screenwriter, director, and producer best known for his work on Cobra Kai (with Jon Hurwitz and Josh Heald), the Harold & Kumar films and American Reunion (with Hurwitz).

== Early life ==
Schlossberg was born in New Jersey, to Jewish parents. Schlossberg met Jon Hurwitz when they both attended Randolph High School. After high school, Schlossberg attended the University of Chicago, where he studied history. Hurwitz went to the University of Pennsylvania's Wharton School, with Josh Heald who lived in the same dorm with him during freshman year. Schlossberg frequently came to visit Hurwitz at Penn, and thus got to know him as well. Schlossberg graduated from the University of Chicago with a degree in history in 2000. His original goal was to study law.

== Career ==
It was during their time in college that Hurwitz and Schlossberg sold their first script Filthy to MGM. Upon selling Filthy, they moved to Hollywood to begin their career in the entertainment industry. The idea for the first Harold and Kumar film, Harold & Kumar Go to White Castle developed while they were living in Los Angeles. Schlossberg and Hurwitz decided to write a low-budget stoner film and base the main characters on their high school friends from Randolph High School. They based the character of Harold on their real-life friend Harold Lee. Hurwitz got the idea to base the film around White Castle from his own experience craving White Castle burgers when he lived in Pennsylvania for several years. At the time, Pennsylvania did not have any White Castle locations and Hurwitz had to have family members bring him frozen White Castle burgers from New Jersey. It was later followed by Harold & Kumar Escape from Guantanamo Bay and A Very Harold & Kumar 3D Christmas. They also wrote and directed the fourth theatrical entry in the American Pie franchise, American Reunion (2012).

They notably worked together on Cobra Kai, a continuation of The Karate Kid franchise. They created the show, along with their close friend Josh Heald. The trio serve as executive producers, show runners, writers, and directors on the series. More recently, he and his friend Jon Hurwitz, along with Josh Heald via Counterbalance Entertainment has signed a deal with Sony Pictures Television.

== Filmography ==
Year	Title	Director	Writer	Producer	Notes
2004	Harold & Kumar Go to White Castle	No	Yes	No	
2008	Harold & Kumar Escape from Guantanamo Bay	Yes	Yes	co-producer	
2008	Harold & Kumar Go to Amsterdam	Yes	Yes	No	Short film
2011	A Very Harold & Kumar Christmas	No	Yes	co-producer	
2012	American Reunion	Yes	Yes	No	
2018	Blockers	No	No	Yes	
2018–2025	Cobra Kai	Yes	Yes	Executive	Also co-creator, Cameo as Terry Silver's lawyer
2021	Plan B	No	No	Yes	
2023	Obliterated	Yes	Yes	Yes	
2026	72 Hours	No	Yes	No	

== See also ==
- Jon Hurwitz
- Josh Heald
