= John Cho =

American actor (born 1972)

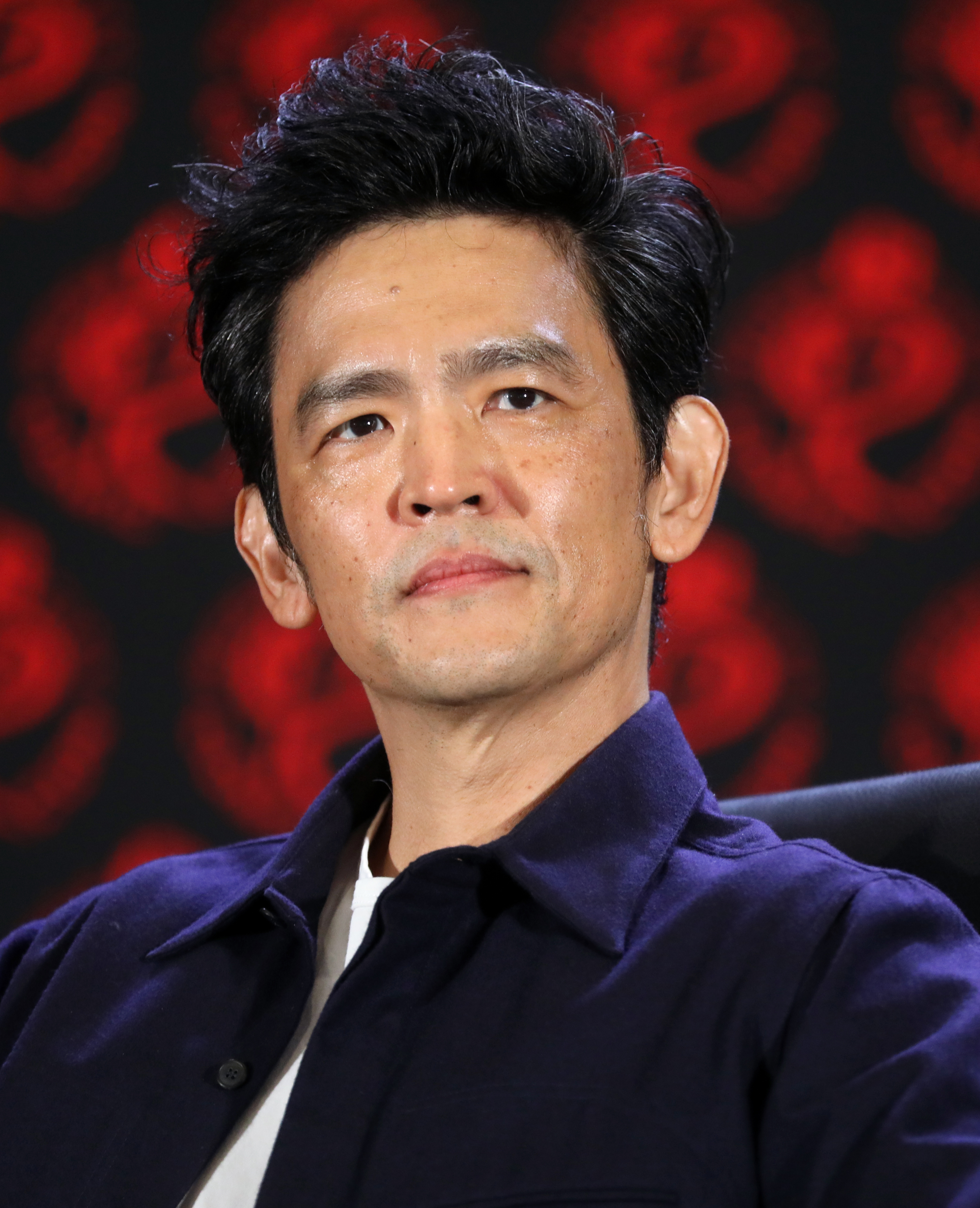
- Cho in 2024
- Born: Cho Yo-Han; June 16, 1972 (age 54); Seoul, South Korea
- Citizenship: United States
- Education: University of California, Berkeley (BA)
- Occupation: Actor
- Years active: 1996–present
- Spouse: Kerri Higuchi (m. 2006)
- Children: 2

Korean name
- Hangul: 조요한
- Hanja: 趙要漢
- RR: Jo Yohan
- MR: Cho Yohan

John Yo-Han Cho (Korean: 조요한; born June 16, 1972) is an American actor. As a performer, he is noted for his subtle and understated style of acting. He is known for his roles as Harold Lee in the Harold & Kumar film series (2004–2011), John/MILF guy #2 in the American Pie film series (1999–2012), and Hikaru Sulu in the Star Trek reboot film series (2009–2016).

Cho became the first Asian American actor cast as a romantic lead in a romantic comedy series when he played Henry Higgs in the sitcom Selfie (2014) and the first to headline a mainstream Hollywood thriller film when he starred in Searching (2018), for which he was nominated for an Independent Spirit Award for Best Male Lead.

Cho has had lead roles in television series such as FlashForward, Off Centre, and The Afterparty, and recurring roles in Sleepy Hollow and Difficult People. In his early career, Cho attained recognition for guest-starring in the fantasy television series Charmed.

== Early life and education ==
Cho was born as Cho Yo-Han (Korean: 조요한) on June 16, 1972 in Seoul, South Korea. He moved to the United States with his family when he was 6 years old in 1978. He was raised in Los Angeles, where his family settled after living in Houston, Texas; Seattle, Washington; Daly City, California; and Monterey Park, California. His father was a minister in the Church of Christ and was originally from North Korea. He grew up with one younger brother. At the time, his father believed in order to survive and assimilate in the U.S., Cho and his brother would need to stop speaking Korean and speak English instead. They would also watch American television as much as they could to absorb the new culture.

Cho graduated from Herbert Hoover High School in Glendale, California, in 1990.

Cho attended the University of California, Berkeley. In 1994, he toured nationally for a stage production of Maxine Hong Kingston's The Woman Warrior by the Berkeley Repertory Theatre. He graduated in 1996 with a Bachelor of Arts in English literature.

== Career ==
=== Acting ===
After graduation, Cho taught English literature at Pacific Hills School in West Hollywood, California, while acting at East West Players in downtown Los Angeles. There, he appeared in Edward Sakamoto's The Taste of Kona Coffee in 1996 and in Euijoon Kim's film My Tired Broke Ass Pontificating Slapstick Funk in 2000.

Cho gained attention with a small role as "MILF guy #2" in the 1999 comedy American Pie, in which he popularized the slang term MILF. Cho reprised the role in three sequels: American Pie 2, American Wedding, and the latest installment American Reunion in which he has a much larger role. His character initially had no name, but he was given the name "John" in the third film, named after Cho himself.

Cho guest-starred on Charmed as the ghost of Mark Chao, one of leading character Piper Halliwell's most prominent love interests, in the episode "Dead Man Dating" in 1998; he indicated in 2024 that it was a role that he "gets asked about... all the time". He was one of the stars of the short-lived situation comedy Off Centre from 2001 to 2002; his character, Chau Presley, became the series' breakout character.

He was a costar on the Fox sitcom Kitchen Confidential, based on Anthony Bourdain's best-selling book. He had supporting roles in the science fiction comedy Evolution, directed by Ivan Reitman; Down to Earth; and Bowfinger.

In 2002, Cho had a starring role in the ensemble cast of Justin Lin's Better Luck Tomorrow, a drama focusing on the travails of a group of Asian Americans living in Southern California who are academically successful but socially discontented, and as a result engage in wantonly violent, criminal behavior. It was well received by critics, with Elvis Mitchell of The New York Times describing Cho's character's "lazy magnetism of which he is charmingly aware". Later that year, the movie Big Fat Liar was released, in which Cho played a Hong Kong-based film director. He refused to do the accent scripted for his character. The director worked with him to re-develop the role.

Cho had a successful starring role as Harold Lee in 2004's Harold & Kumar Go to White Castle and reprised the role in 2008's Harold & Kumar Escape from Guantanamo Bay which earned $38 million at the box office, and again in 2011's A Very Harold & Kumar 3D Christmas which made $35 million. Cho's role in the popular franchise was written specifically for him by Hayden Schlossberg, and Cho has recounted that when Schlossberg first approached him with the role, he was initially suspicious.

Cho appeared in the July 2004 issue of KoreAm Journal and, in September 2006, was cast in NBC's new comedy The Singles Table, but the series never aired due to changes in scheduling and production. In 2006 and again in 2009, Cho was selected as one of the sexiest men alive in People magazine.

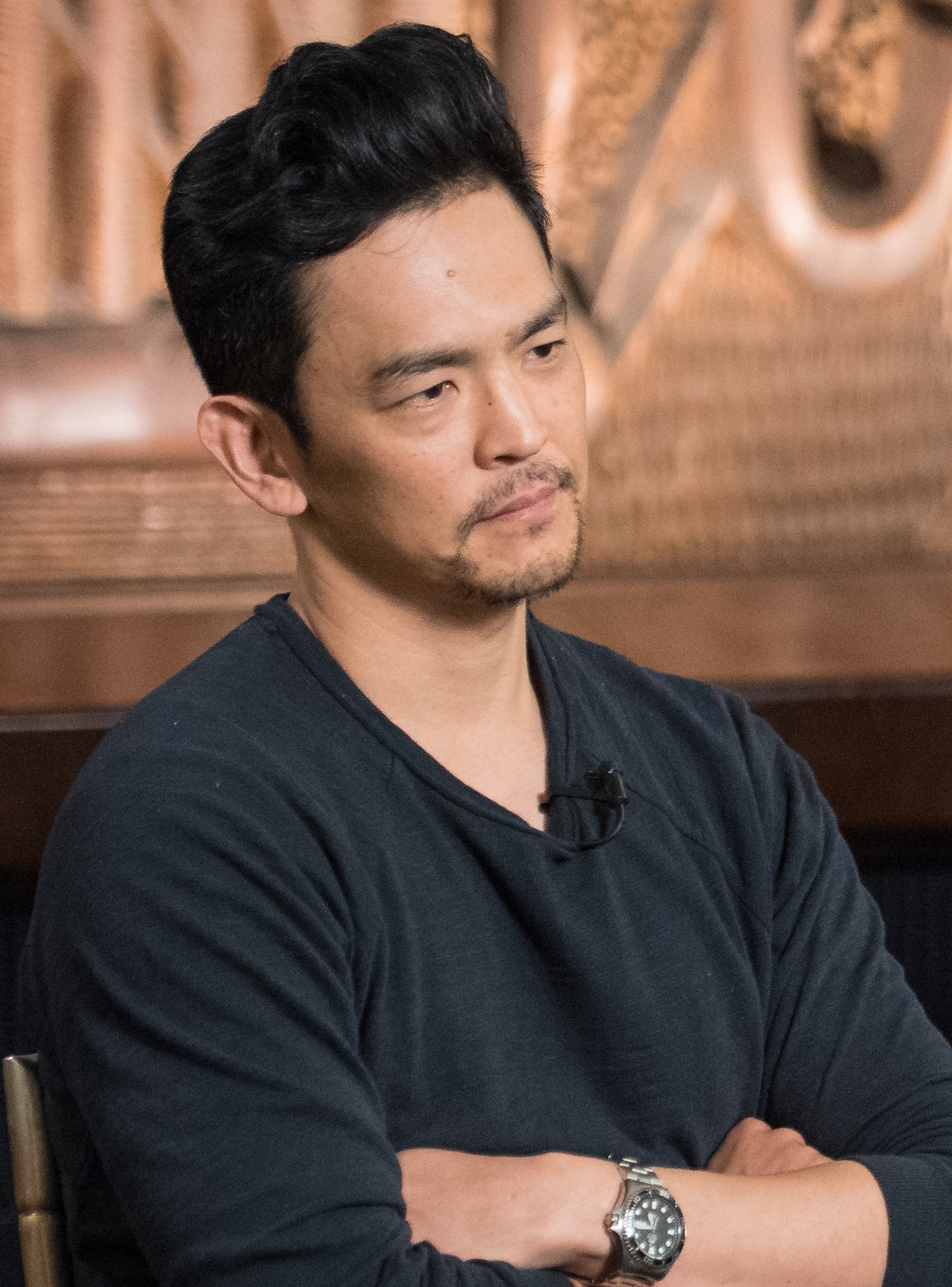
In 2018, Cho was interviewed at the John F. Kennedy Center for the Performing Arts.

In 2007, Cho was added to the cast of Ugly Betty as a recurring character. Cho plays Kenny, a best friend of accountant Henry Grubstick. Cho played helmsman Hikaru Sulu in J. J. Abrams's feature film Star Trek. Manohla Dargis of The New York Times praised him for making his role "ultimately and rather wonderfully [his] own".

Cho appeared in Nas' "Be a Nigger Too" music video along with various celebrities and had a guest appearance on the sitcom How I Met Your Mother, in the episode "I'm Not That Guy" where he played a partner in an evil law firm. Of the latter, Staci Krause of IGN, wrote that Cho was "the scene stealer in this episode" and that she would "definitely like to see more of him" in the series.

From 2009 to 2010, Cho starred in the television series FlashForward as FBI Special Agent Demetri Noh. His character was originally slated to be killed off during what turned out to be the show's only season, but after his turn as Sulu in Star Trek boosted his popularity, the producers revised the show's storyline so that he survived, in an attempt to boost declining ratings.

In 2012, he was part of the ensemble cast of Go On as Steven.

Cho starred as Henry Higgs in the short-lived sitcom Selfie, a retooling of the play Pygmalion by George Bernard Shaw, becoming the first Asian American man to play a romantic lead on a U.S. romantic comedy television series in 2014. At the time, Keli Lee was the executive vice president of Talent and Casting at ABC who selected Cho as a candidate and also previously cast Cho in Flashforward. Julie Anne Robinson, one of the directors and executive producers of Selfie, revealed in 2021 interviews that she strongly supported casting Cho and had to persuade "top to bottom of everybody in that chain" that he was the perfect choice for the role, which took considerable time. Robinson fought for Cho and won, saying, "That's what I'm most proud of about that whole pilot." The show continued to have a dedicated fan following after its broadcast, especially in China. The slow burn romance was similar to a Korean drama, which appealed to fans. In July 2022, when Cho was asked about his thoughts on the show's cancellation, he answered, "I'm still stunned to see how many people still love that series. And yeah, I was bummed when it got canceled. I just thought that was a good show." In January 2023, Cho mentioned he had not received many offers for romantic comedy roles since Selfie. There were talks of a Selfie movie revival with Stars Collective, but plans have been stalled due to the Warner Brothers not selling the film rights.

In 2016, he was a series regular for the television show as Andy Kim in the second season of The Exorcist television series. In 2017, he starred in the film Columbus, which received critical acclaim. In 2018, Cho starred in the film Searching, playing a man combing social media for clues to his daughter's disappearance. He was the first Asian American actor to headline a mainstream thriller in Hollywood. Also in 2018, he was presented with the Spotlight Award at the San Diego International Film Festival.

In April 2019, Variety reported that Cho had been cast as Spike Spiegel in a live-action version of the Cowboy Bebop series. However, production shut down when Cho suffered a knee injury in October and remained shut down until late September 2020 due to the COVID-19 pandemic. Cowboy Bebop premiered on Netflix on November 19, 2021.

Cho wrote a middle school novel for younger readers called Troublemaker, which was released on March 22, 2022. Also in 2022, Cho was cast in the second season of Apple TV+'s comedy series The Afterparty as "Funcle" Ulysses Zhu. The new season premiered in July 2023.

In May 2024, he had a cameo in the television adaptation of The Sympathizer. In early August 2024, Cho voiced in the audiobook version of the romantic comedy book, Drop Dead, written by Lily Chu. Cho starred in a sci-fi horror film, Afraid, released on August 30, 2024.

In February 2025, Cho was cast in the second season of Poker Face. He also had cameos in several Murderbot episodes, which premiered on May 16, 2025. Cho made his Korean drama debut in Tempest, which was released on Disney+ and Hulu on September 10, 2025.

In early 2026, Cho was cast in the Apple TV series The Off Weeks.

Cho was also cast as Pastor Hwan Yoon in Your Mother Your Mother Your Mother. The film was released on September 25, 2026.

=== Music ===
Cho is the lead singer for Viva La Union (formerly known as Left of Zed), a Los Angeles garage rock band composed of former Berkeley and USC students. They have one album, self-titled, while their song "Chinese Baby" is on the Harold & Kumar Escape from Guantanamo Bay soundtrack.

== Personal life ==
Cho married actress Kerri Higuchi in 2006. They met at UC Berkeley and later dated when they moved to Los Angeles. They have a son, born in 2008, and a daughter, born in 2013. As of 2015, he and his family live in Los Angeles, California. He is close to his father, a former preacher; he has said he would like to play a role in the story of his father's generation, growing up in North Korea through the Korean War.

Cho has said he found freedom in portraying Harold in the Harold and Kumar films because the stoner character goes against the grain of Asian Americans on screen. He has said he has experienced racism during his career in Hollywood and that he tries to take roles that do not perpetuate Asian stereotypes. Cho said he refused a request to do an Asian accent for Big Fat Liar, writing, "I don't want to do this role in a kid's comedy, with an accent, because I don't want young people laughing at an accent inadvertently". In a 2015 tweet, he said, "Stop turning Asian roles white. It's bullshit and we all know it." He described his casting in Selfie, which made him the first Asian to play a romantic lead on a U.S. romantic comedy television series, as being "revolutionary" and a "personal revolution". He said, "Asians narratively in shows are insignificant. They're the cop, or waitress, or whatever it is. You see them in the background. So to be in this position...is bit of a landmark".

In 2016, Cho was the face of the "#StarringJohnCho" social movement and hashtag campaign, a bid to call attention to the lack of opportunities for Asian American actors in Hollywood. Created by William Yu, it Photoshopped Cho's face onto existing movie posters as the male lead. This created a domino effect: it inspired director Jon M. Chu to create the film adaptation of Crazy Rich Asians and that film's success inspired Ke Huy Quan to return to acting in Everything Everywhere All at Once.

Cho supported the 2008 election campaign and the 2012 re-election campaign of Democratic U.S. President Barack Obama. He supported the Democratic nominee Joe Biden in the 2020 U.S. presidential election. Cho also supported the 2024 election campaign of Democratic presidential candidate Kamala Harris.

== Filmography ==
Key
†	Denotes films that have not yet been released

=== Film ===
Year	Title	Role	Notes
1997	Shopping for Fangs	Clarence	
1997	Wag the Dog	Aide #3	
1998	Yellow	Joey	
1999	American Beauty	Sale house man #1	
1999	American Pie	MILF guy #2	
1999	Bowfinger	Nightclub cleaner	
2000	The Flintstones in Viva Rock Vegas	Parking valet	
2001	American Pie 2	John (MILF guy #2)	
2001	Delivering Milo	Mr. Hugo	
2001	Down to Earth	Phil Quon	
2001	Evolution	Student	
2001	Pavilion of Women	Fengmo Wu	
2002	Better Luck Tomorrow	Steve Choe	
2002	Big Fat Liar	Dustin Wong	
2002	Solaris	DBA emissary #1	
2003	American Wedding	John	
2004	Harold & Kumar Go to White Castle	Harold Lee	
2004	In Good Company	Petey	
2004	See This Movie	Larry Finkelstein	
2005	American Dreamz	Frank Ittles	
2005	Bam Bam and Celeste	Stephan	
2006	Bickford Shmeckler's Cool Ideas	Tom	
2007	West 32nd	John Kim	
2008	Harold & Kumar Escape from Guantanamo Bay	Harold Lee	
2008	Nick and Norah's Infinite Playlist	Hype Man	
2008	Smiley Face	Mike	
2009	Saint John of Las Vegas	Carnival Human Torch	
2009	Star Trek	Hikaru Sulu	
2011	A Very Harold & Kumar Christmas	Harold Lee	
2012	American Reunion	MILF guy #2	
2012	Total Recall	Bob McClane	
2013	Identity Thief	Daniel Casey	
2013	Star Trek Into Darkness	Hikaru Sulu	
2013	The Tale of the Princess Kaguya	Middle Counselor Isonokami (voice)	English dub
2013	That Burning Feeling	Roger Whitacre	
2015	Grandma	Chau	
2015	Zipper	EJ	
2015	Parallel Man: Infinite Pursuit	Nick Morgan	Short film
2016	Get a Job	Brian Bender	
2016	Star Trek Beyond	Hikaru Sulu	
2017	Columbus	Jin Lee	
2017	Gemini	Edward Ahn	
2017	A Happening of Monumental Proportions	Mr. Ramirez	
2017	Literally, Right Before Aaron	Mark	
2018	The Oath	Peter Barber	
2018	Mirai	Mr. Ota (voice)	English dub
2018	Searching	David Kim	
2019	Between Two Ferns: The Movie	Himself	
2020	The Grudge	Peter Spencer	
2020	Tigertail	Grover	Scenes cut; also executive producer
2020	Over the Moon	Ba Ba (voice)	
2021	Wish Dragon	Long (voice)	English dub
2022	Don't Make Me Go	Max Park	
2023	Ghosted	The Leopard	Cameo
2023	The Graduates	John	Also executive producer
2024	Afraid	Curtis	
2026	Your Mother Your Mother Your Mother	Hwan Yoon	
TBA	Slime †	TBA (voice)	In production
TBA	Bad Influence †	TBA	Post-production

=== Television ===
Year	Title	Role	Notes
1997	The Jeff Foxworthy Show	Pizza delivery man	Episode: "Twister of Fate"
1998	Felicity	Larry	Episode: "The Last Stand"
1998	Charmed	Mark Chao	Episode: "Dead Man Dating"
2001	Static Shock	Thomas Kim / Tantrum, Navigator (voices)	2 episodes
2001–2002	Off Centre	Chau Presley	Main role
2002	The Jamie Kennedy Experiment	Himself	1 episode
2005	The Men's Room	Bob	4 episodes
2005	House M.D.	Harvey Park	Episode: "Love Hurts"
2005–2006	Kitchen Confidential	Teddy Wong	Recurring role
2006	Grey's Anatomy	Marshall Stone	Episode: "Damage Case"
2006–2023	American Dad!	Vince Chung (voice)	6 episodes
2007	How I Met Your Mother	Jefferson Coatsworth	Episode: "I'm Not That Guy"
2007	Ugly Betty	Kenny	3 episodes
2007	'Til Death	Lucas Bender	Episode: "Come Out and Play"
2008	Hollywood Residential	Himself	Episode: "It Happens"
2009–2010	FlashForward	Demetri Noh	Main role
2010	Childrens Hospital	Park	Episode: "Frankfurters. Allman Brothers. Death. Frankfurters"
2011	30 Rock	Lorne	Episode: "Double-Edged Sword"
2011	NTSF:SD:SUV::	Chip	Episode: "The Birthday Part That Was Neither"
2012–2013	Go On	Steven	Main role
2013–2014	Sleepy Hollow	Andy Brooks	7 episodes
2014	Selfie	Henry Higgs	Main role
2015	BoJack Horseman	Lead improv-er (voice)	2 episodes
2015	The Mindy Project	Big Murder	Episode: "Lahiri Family Values"
2016	New Girl	Daniel	Episode: "Jury Duty"
2016	House of Lies	Sean Chew	Episode: "Holacracy"
2016	Drunk History	William Shakespeare	Episode: "Landmarks"
2016	Lip Sync Battle	Himself	Episode: "Ben Kingsley vs. John Cho"
2016	The Hindenburg Explodes!	Reggie	Pilot
2017	Difficult People	Todd Ross	4 episodes
2017	The Exorcist	Andrew Kim	Main role (season 2)
2017	Do You Want to See a Dead Body?	Himself	Episode: "A Body and Some Quicksand"
2019	The Twilight Zone	Raff Hanks	Episode: "The Wunderkind"
2020	Home Movie: The Princess Bride	Inigo Montoya	Episode: "Chapter Nine: Have Fun Storming The Castle!"
2021	Cowboy Bebop	Spike Spiegel	Main role
2023	The Afterparty	"Funcle" Ulysses Zhu	Main role (season 2)
2023	Praise Petey	Bandit (voice)	
2023	Artbound	Himself	Season 14, episode 6: "East West Players: A Home on Stage"; documentary
2024	The Sympathizer	James Yoon	Miniseries
2025	Poker Face	Guy	Season 2, episode 8: "The Sleazy Georgian"
2025	Murderbot	Eknie Jef Chem (playing Captain Hossein)	Cameo
2025	Long Story Short	TAMIT Boss (voice)	Episode: "There's A Mattress In There"
2025	Tempest	Anderson Miller	Korean drama
TBA	The Off Weeks		Upcoming miniseries

=== Stage ===
Year	Title
1994	The Woman Warrior
1995	Ikebana
1996	The Taste of Kono Coffee
1997	F.O.B.
2000	My Broke Ass Pontificating Slapstick Funk

=== Web series ===
Year	Title	Role
2015	Parallel Man: Infinite Pursuit	Agent Nick Morgan

=== Video games ===
Year	Title	Voice role	Notes
1997	D.A. Pursuit of Justice	Lu Sun	
2003	Batman: Rise of Sin Tzu	Additional characters	
2013	Star Trek	Hikaru Sulu	

=== Audiobooks ===
- Troublemaker (2022) - author and narrator
- Drop Dead (2024) - narrator

== Discography ==
Band: Left of Zed

- Demo tape (1998)
- Album: Furious Bloom (2004)

Band: Viva La Union

- Album: Viva La Union (2009)

== Bibliography ==
- Troublemaker (March 22, 2022) – middle school grade novel for younger readers
