= Robin Lung =

American film maker

- Occupation: Filmmaker, film director
- Works: Finding Kukan

Robin Lung is a Chinese-American filmmaker and producer based in Hawai'i. Lung is most known for her documentary Finding Kukan, which focuses on the overlooked producer of Kukan, Li Ling A.

Lung graduated from Kalāheo High School in 1978. She later went on to attend and graduate from Stanford University and Hunter College. She is married to artist Paul Levitt.

In 2008, Lung produced and wrote the documentary "Washington Place: Hawaii's First Home," which focused on Queen Liliuokalani of Hawai'i. Lung was the associate producer for the 2008 documentary Patsy Mink: Ahead of the Majority. Lung was an additional producer on NOVA's "Killer Typhoon," which was released in 2014. In October 2015, she was selected as one of the 10 women selected for the National Association of Latino Independent Producers's Diverse Women in Media Residency Lab that took place in Vermont, alongside Sarita Khurana and Melissa Haizlip. In 2016, Lung's documentary Finding Kukan. It was shown at DOCNYC, a documentary film festival in November 2016. It had been nominated for several awards at the Hawaii International Film Festival, CAAMFest, and Los Angeles Asian Pacific Film Festival. It also won best "Notable Films for Adults" for 2019 by the American Library Association in 2019. Lung attended the Chinese American Women in History Conference 2019 at the Chinese American Museum DC.

It was announced on April 5, 2022 that Lung is one of the twenty 2022 ITVS Humanities Documentary Development Fellows, along with Rodrigo Dorfman. On April 7, 2022 Lung participated in a Webinar hosted by the Historic Hawaii Foundation titled "The Preservation of the Nancy Bannick Collection at the Hawai‘i State Archives" alongside Architectural Historian Dr. Don Hibbard and Hawai‘i State Archivist Dr. Adam Jansen. In November 2022, Lung attended the Hawai’i International Film Festival and showed a short documentary film called “Nancy Bannick: Saving Honolulu’s Chinatown,” which is about photo journalist Nancy Bannick and her work to preserve Honolulu’s Chinatown in the face of urban renewal.
