= Kimberlee Bassford =

American documentary filmmaker

Kimberlee Bassford is an independent documentary filmmaker from Honolulu, Hawai‘i. In 2005, she founded documentary production company Making Waves Films LLC. She advocates for gender equity and diversity in films and television. Most of her work focuses on Asian American women and girls, and her films actively seek to correct underrepresentation of those groups in the media.

She won the Student Academy Award for her documentary Cheerleader and a CINE Golden Eagle Award. Her films have been screened at events such as the Cannes Film Festival, the San Francisco International Asian American Film Festival, and Gate City Women's Film Festival.

She has been featured on the Insights on PBS Hawai‘i program, OC16's Hawai‘i's Reel Stories series, in the feature documentary Rise of the Wahine: Champions of Title IX and in the podcast American Beauty. She has spoken at colleges and community events in Hawai‘i, including those for the American Association of University Women, Honolulu Civil Beat's Civil Café, Hawai‘i Women in Filmmaking, SAG-AFTRA Hawai‘i, and the dedication ceremony of the Patsy T. Mink sculpture.

== Education ==
Bassford has a BA in psychology from Harvard College and a Masters of Journalism from the University of California, Berkeley.

== Career ==
Bassford produced and directed the documentaries Winning Girl (2014, World Channel), Patsy Mink: Ahead of the Majority (2008, PBS) and Cheerleader (2003, HBO Family). She was a producer on episode 6, "Collateral Damage," in the PBS documentary series Unnatural Causes: Is Inequality Making Us Sick? (2008). She was also producer for The Meaning of Food (2005), a three-part documentary series.

She established Making Waves Films LLC, a documentary production company, in 2005.

In 2019, she was a director for the Reel Wāhine of Hawaiʻi series, which profiles various accomplished women filmmakers from Hawaiʻi.

Bassford is currently an instructor of journalism at Windward Community College, where she is also advisor for the school's student newspaper, Ka 'Ohana.

=== Cheerleader (2003) ===
Cheerleader is a short documentary about a squad of California cheerleaders attempting to compete in the national cheerleading championships. The film won the Student Academy Award in Documentary and was screened at the as part of the independently organized Kodak Emerging Filmmaker Showcase in Cannes, France. This program is independent of and not affiliated with the Cannes Film Festival.

=== Patsy Mink: Ahead of the Majority (2008) ===
Bassford produced, directed, wrote and co-edited Patsy Mink: Ahead of the Majority, which won the Audience Award for Favorite Documentary at the Hawai'i International Film Festival. It also won a CINE Golden Eagle and received awards at the San Francisco International Asian American Film Festival, DisOrient Asian American Film Festival, San Joaquin International Film Festival, Honolulu International Film Festival, San Francisco Women's Film Festival, and Gate City Women's Film Festival.

The film is about Patsy Takemoto Mink, who became the first woman of color in the United States Congress in 1965. Mink co-authored Title IX, legislation that prohibits sex discrimination in higher education and athletics, in 1971. The film aired nationally on PBS in 2009.

=== Lotus Root: A Great Granddaughter's Journey (2010) ===
This short documentary is about Bassford's great-grandfather, Chun Quon Yee Hop, who was a successful businessman and philanthropist and the first person from her maternal family to come to Hawai‘i.

=== Winning Girl (2014) ===
Winning Girl tells the story of Teshya Alo, a teenage girl from Hawai‘i who is striving to be an Olympian in two male-dominated sports: wrestling and judo. The film explores Alo's competitions as well as her family life and coming of age. The documentary won the Special Jury Award for Documentary Feature at the Los Angeles Asian Pacific Film Festival. Bassford remarked that "Teshya is a shining example of a post-Title IX girl who has benefited from all the opportunities of athletics and who defines for herself what a girl can and should be." Bassford's target audience for the film is young girls.

=== Before the Moon Falls (2025) ===
This documentary tells the story of Samoan writer Sia Figiel, from 2016 when she walked across the United States to raise awareness for diabetes, to her arrest for the murder of Samoan academic and poet Caroline Sinavaiana-Gabbard in 2024. The documentary focuses on Figiel's struggles with her mental health.

== Awards and honors ==
Bassford has won film festival audience awards and grand jury prizes, a duPont-Columbia Award, Student Academy Award, CINE Golden Eagles, and has been featured on panels and juries for ITVS, Center for Asian American Media, Pacific Islanders in Communications, Hawai‘i International Film Festival, and the Ohina Short Film Showcase.

== Personal life ==
Bassford is married with two children. She has spoken about the challenges of being a working mother. While making Winning Girl, she was pregnant and gave birth to her second child. As a result, she "ultimately outsourced quite a bit of work" and struggled "to attend screenings and other events."

One of her major influences is the film Then There Were None by Elizabeth Kapu‘uwailani Lindsey.
