= Sia Figiel =

Samoan novelist, poet and painter (1967–2026)

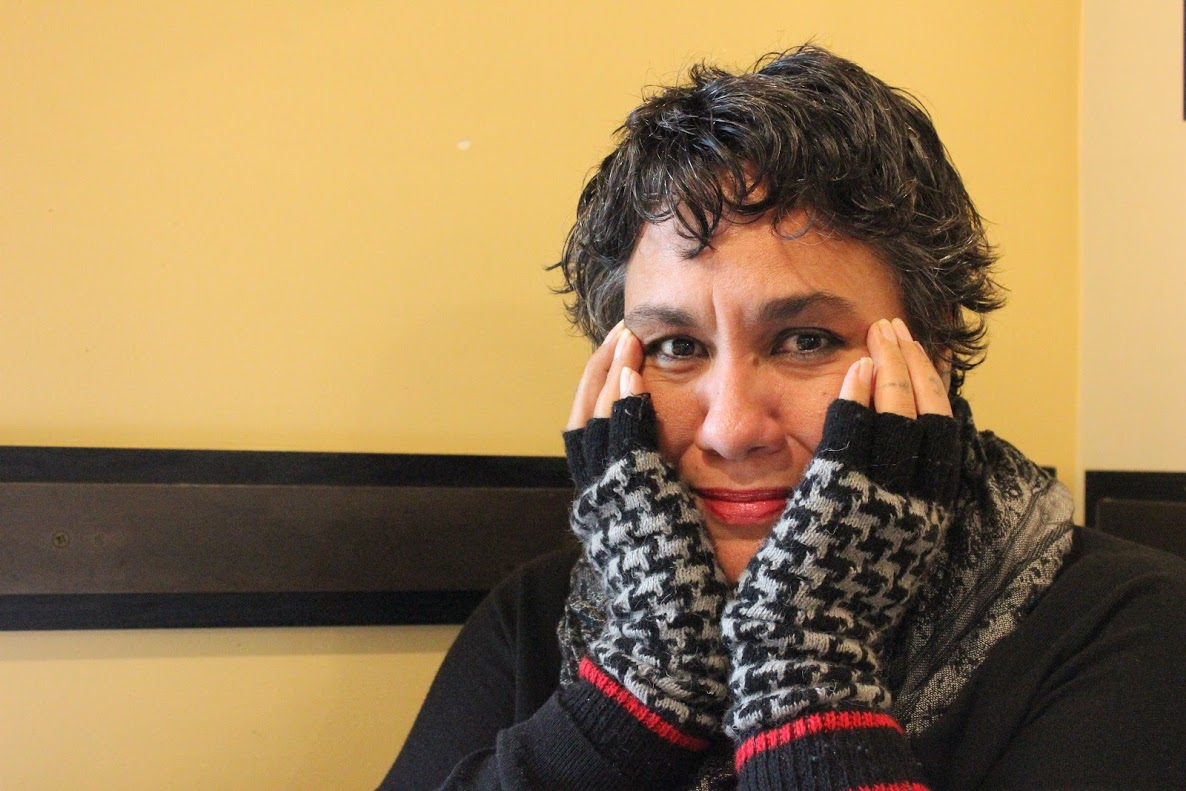
- Born: Sia Figiel; 6 January 1967; Matautu Tai, Samoa
- Died: 26 January 2026 (aged 59); Tanumalala Prison, Samoa
- Education: Whitworth College
- Occupations: Novelist; poet; painter
- Writing career
- Language: English, Samoan and Spanish
- Notable work: Where We Once Belonged
- Notable awards: Commonwealth Writers' Prize

Papalii Sia Figiel (6 January 1967 – 26 January 2026) was a Samoan novelist, poet and painter. In 2024, she was charged with murder.

== Early life ==
Sia Figiel was born in Matautu Tai, Samoa on 6 January 1967, to a Samoan mother and a Polish-American father. She grew up amidst traditional Samoan singing and poetry, which heavily influenced her writing. Figiel's greatest influence and inspiration in her career was the Samoan novelist and poet, Albert Wendt. Her formal schooling was conducted in Samoa and New Zealand where she also began a Bachelor of Arts, which was later completed at Whitworth College in the United States. She travelled in Europe and completed writers' residencies at the University of the South Pacific, Suva, and the University of Technology Sydney.

== Career ==
Initially an artist, Figiel had her paintings exhibited in Leipzig and Berlin, Germany, where she lived from 1991 to 1994.

Figiel's poetry won the Polynesian Literary Competition in 1994 and her novel Where We Once Belonged won the 1997 Best First Book award in the South East Asia/South Pacific Region of the Commonwealth Writers' Prize. Her works have been translated into French, German, Catalan, Danish, Spanish, Swedish, Turkish and Portuguese.

In 2000, Figiel performed her Oceanic poetry at the University of Hawaiʻi's twenty-fifth annual Pacific Island Studies conference. The performances of Figiel and Teresia Teaiwa were recorded at this conference and released in a joint production with Hawaiʻi Dub Machine records and 'Elepaio Press. The album is titled Terenesia. Figiel was also a contributor to The Contemporary Pacific journal on multiple occasions, including publications in 1998 and 2010.

Selected poetry by Figiel was included in UPU, a compilation of Pacific Island writers’ work which was first presented at the Silo Theatre as part of the Auckland Arts Festival in March 2020. UPU was remounted as part of the Kia Mau Festival in Wellington in June 2021.

== Personal life ==
Figiel was diagnosed with type 2 diabetes in 2003. Several members of her family had the disease, and diabetes-related complications caused the deaths of both of her parents. She initially kept her diagnosis private, later stating that she did not want the condition to define her as a writer or public figure. Following the deaths of family members and friends from diabetes-related complications, she began to speak publicly about the illness. Figiel also experienced depression and bipolar disorder.

In 2012, following her relocation to the United States, Figiel began addressing her condition more openly, making appearances at conferences and university campuses. She shared her personal experiences as part of diabetes awareness and prevention efforts, particularly in the Pacific region.

By 2014, her health had improved sufficiently for her to complete the Nautica Malibu Triathlon. Her story was featured on CNN, where she discussed her relationship with food and the cultural challenges of managing diabetes after growing up in American Samoa, where food plays a central role in social and cultural life. After moving to Utah, she lost approximately 45 kilograms (100 lb).

Figiel experienced significant complications from diabetes, including major dental problems and recurrent episodes of hypoglycemia. During this period, her young son learned how to administer insulin injections and assisted in her care, which she later described as life-saving on multiple occasions.

=== Murder trial ===
On 28 May 2024, Figiel was charged with murdering Samoan academic and poet Caroline Sinavaiana-Gabbard. The trial in the Samoa Supreme Court began in August 2025. Figiel pleaded not guilty to five charges—murder, manslaughter, two counts of being armed with a dangerous weapon, and causing serious injuries. She reportedly told the court "the devil persuaded her" to commit the offences.

In 2025, Hawaiian director Kimberlee Bassford released a documentary about Figiel, Before the Moon Falls, focusing on her life since 2016, her mental health struggles and the murder charge.

== Death ==
On 26 January 2026, Figiel was found dead in her cell at Tanumalala Prison. She was 59.

== Novels and poetry ==
=== Where We Once Belonged ===
Figiel's Where We Once Belonged is a Samoan novel set in the fictitious village of Malaefou. It is focused around the titular character, Alofa, a name that literally means love in the Samoan language, and her various encounters with violence and sex. In telling this story, Figiel writes with complex prose that is highly poetic and dream-like. Her writing style is emblematic of Su'ife-filoi, a Samoan form of story telling centred around the "quilt-like weaving of words".

Where We Once Belonged was the first novel written by a Samoan woman to be published in the United States. The novel was adapted into a play by Dave Armstrong, a 2008 production of the play winning the Chapman Tripp Theatre Award for best new New Zealand play.

=== They Who Do Not Grieve ===
In her second novel, They Who Do Not Grieve, published in 2003 by Kaya Press, Figiel incorporates her poetic talents through the voices of three generations of women who descend from Samoa and New Zealand. Writing in a highly poetic medium, They Who Do Not Grieve tells the story of two twin sisters who introduce tattooing to Samoa. Through this themes of self-determination, femininity, and coming of age are addressed.

=== The Girl in the Moon Circle ===
The Girl in the Moon Circle is a collection of poetic works published in 1996 by the Institute of Pacific Studies. It depicts life in Samoan society from the point of view of a ten-year-old girl named Samoana. This semi-autobiographical collection illustrates the simplistic aspects of Samoan culture, along with the commonplace experiences of a young ten-year-old girl, such as school, friends, family, church and boy crushes.

=== To a Young Artist in Contemplation ===
Figiel's To a Young Artist in Contemplation is a collection of poetry and prose published in 1998 by the Institute of Pacific Studies.

=== Freelove ===
In her novel Freelove, the 17-year-old protagonist, Inosia Alofafua Afatasi from the fictional Western Samoan village of Nu'uolemanusa, is sent by her mother on an errand to the city of Apia. A chance encounter there with her spiritual brother Loage Viliamu, the son of the pastor in her village and her school teacher, leads her into an unexpected and forbidden relationship. The tale comments on social and communal changes, and was published in 2017 on Kindle and in print in 2018 by Little Island Press.

== List of works ==
Novels

- Where We Once Belonged (New Zealand: Pasifika, 1996) ISBN 0-908597-27-4
- They Who Do Not Grieve (1999) ISBN 1-74051-010-0; Kaya Press, 2003, ISBN 978-1-885030-33-7

Poetry and stories

- The Girl in the Moon Circle (1996) ISBN 2-7427-2372-2
- To a Young Artist in Contemplation, Pacific Writing Forum, USP, 1998, ISBN 978-982-366-005-9 Excerpt

Anthologies

- Wendt, Albert; Whaitiri, Reina; Sullivan, Robert, eds. (2003). "Behind the Steel Bars; Songs of the Fat Brown Woman". Whetu moana: contemporary Polynesian poems in English. University of Hawaiʻi Press. ISBN 978-0-8248-2756-4.
- Huia Publishers, ed. (2006). "The Dancers". Niu Voices. Huia Publishers. ISBN 978-1-86969-254-4.

== Relevant literature ==
- Ramsay, Raylene. 2018. "Indigenous Women Writers in the Pacific: Déwé Gorodé, Sia Figiel, Patricia Grace." Postcolonial Text 7.1:1-18. (2012).
