= Arlene Horowitz =

American women's activist and author

Arlene Horowitz (born 1946) is an American women's activist and the author the Women's Educational Equity Act.

== Biography ==
Horowitz was born to Jewish immigrant, working-class parents in The Bronx, New York. She was orphaned in 1962 at the age of 15. Believing that the only hope she might have for a decent life was education, thanks to the lucky combination of a free higher education offered to academically-qualified New York City residents and her father's Social Security payments, she was able to earn a bachelor's degree in political science from Hunter College in 1967. [She went on to earn a master's degree from Rutgers University in 1993.]

In 1968 she moved to Washington, D.C. and worked in a series of low-level jobs on Capitol Hill, including staff assistant to an education subcommittee in the House of Representatives.

Frustrated by lack of job advancement and the overt acceptance of discrimination against women, she helped organize other women on Capitol Hill and helped to launch the first survey comparing employment practices and salary differentials between male and female employees. Asked to become an original member of the Legislative Core of the then-fledgling National Women's Political Caucus, she gave a workshop on legislative process at the NWPC's initial organizing conference in Wichita, Kansas in 1973.

In Backlash Susan Faludi explains, "[t]he woman who first proposed WEEA wasn't even one of those 'radical feminists' from NOW; Arlene Horowitz was a clerical worker in a congressional office, a working woman who understood from personal experience —trying to live off her skimpy paycheck— that unequal schooling could have painful and long-term consequences."

Horowitz was threatened by dismissal for her activism in the women's movement. Using a $70 portable typewriter and her legislative knowledge gained in Congress, she worked nights and weekends to draft what was to become the Women's Educational Equity Act.

She authored the Women's Educational Equity Act (WEEA) enacted as part of P.L. 93-380. She was cited in the July 30, 1974 Congressional Record by Congresswoman Patsy T. Mink for "diligent and able work." and listed on the National Women's History Project Path of the Women's Rights Movement for 1974. First documented in National Politics and Sex Discrimination in Education by Andrew Fishel and Janice Pottker in 1977, the WEEA has been funded by Congress to the present day.

It is not clear if Arlene Horowitz is still alive.
