= Kelly Hu =

American actress (born 1968)

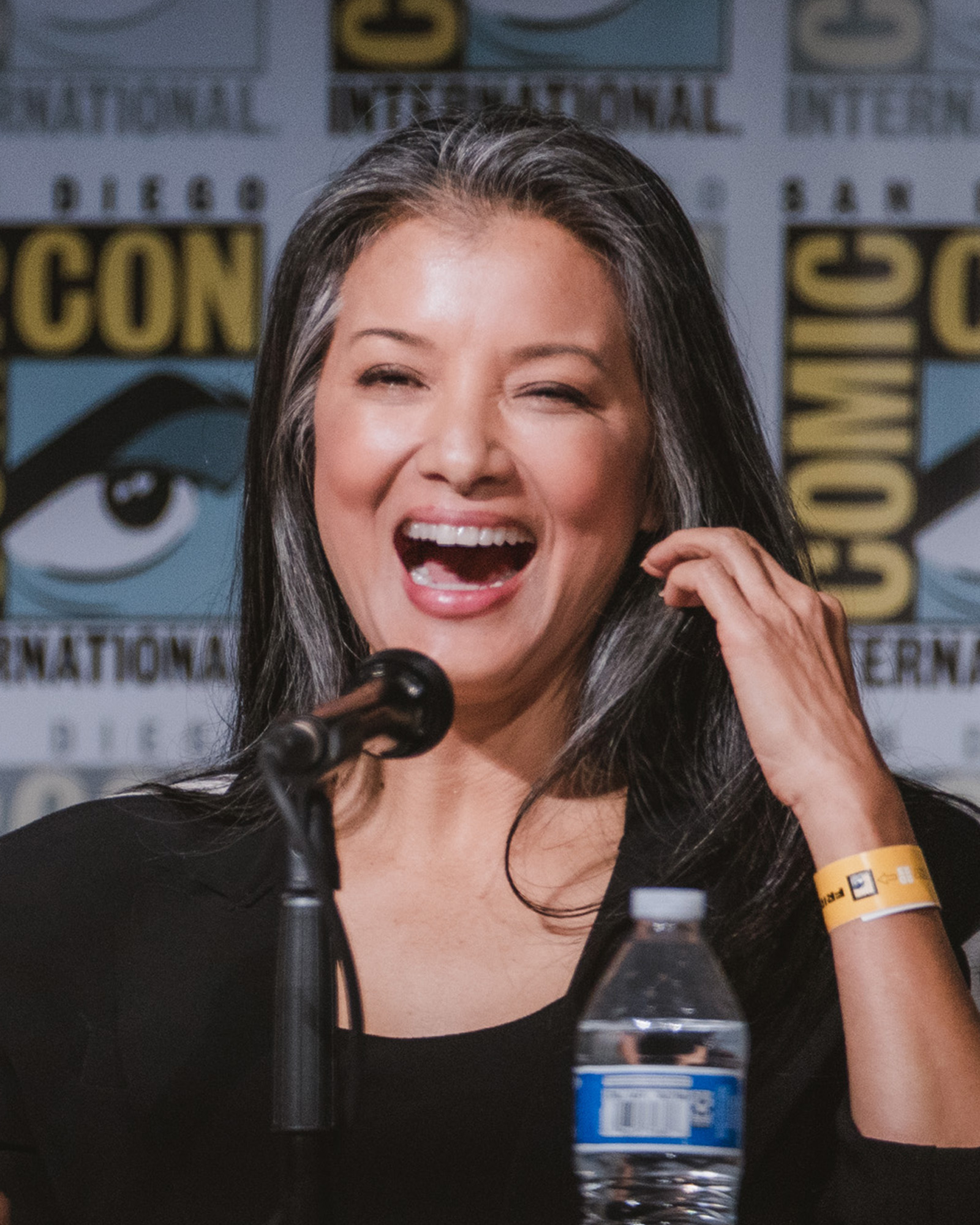
- Hu in 2023
- Born: Kelly Ann Hu; February 13, 1968 (age 58); Honolulu, Hawaii, U.S.
- Occupations: Actress; model
- Years active: 1989–present
- Website: kellyhu.com

Kelly Ann Hu (Kai Li Hu) (Chinese: 胡凯丽; pinyin: Hú Kǎilì) (born February 13, 1968) is an American actress. She starred as Dr. Rae Chang on the American television soap opera Sunset Beach and as Michelle Chan on the American television police drama series Nash Bridges. She has starred in numerous films including The Scorpion King (2002) as Cassandra, Cradle 2 the Grave (2003) as Sona, X2 (2003) as Yuriko Oyama / Lady Deathstrike, The Tournament (2009) as Lai Lai Zhen, and White Frog (2012). She appeared as China White / Chen Na Wei in The CW series Arrow.

Hu has had recurring roles as Pearl on The CW series The Vampire Diaries, Hamato Miwa / Karai on Teenage Mutant Ninja Turtles, Stacy Hirano on the Disney Channel animated series Phineas and Ferb, and as Adira in Rapunzel's Tangled Adventure. She also voices Cheshire and Paula Crock / Huntress in Young Justice.

== Early life ==
Kelly Hu was born on February 13, 1968, in Honolulu, Hawaii, the daughter of Juanita and Herbert Hu. Her parents divorced during Hu's childhood and her mother married Roy Takara. Her brother Glenn retired as a lieutenant colonel in the United States Army, and continued working as a civilian GS human resources officer with the Army Reserve for a total of 36 years of government service. She is of Chinese, English, and Native Hawaiian descent. She attended Maʻemaʻe Elementary School and Kamehameha Schools in Honolulu, Hawaii.

== Career ==
=== Modelling ===
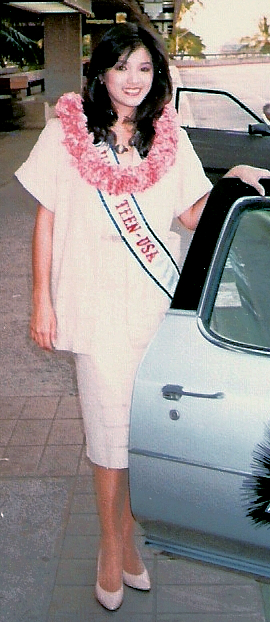
Hu as Miss Hawaii Teen USA 1985

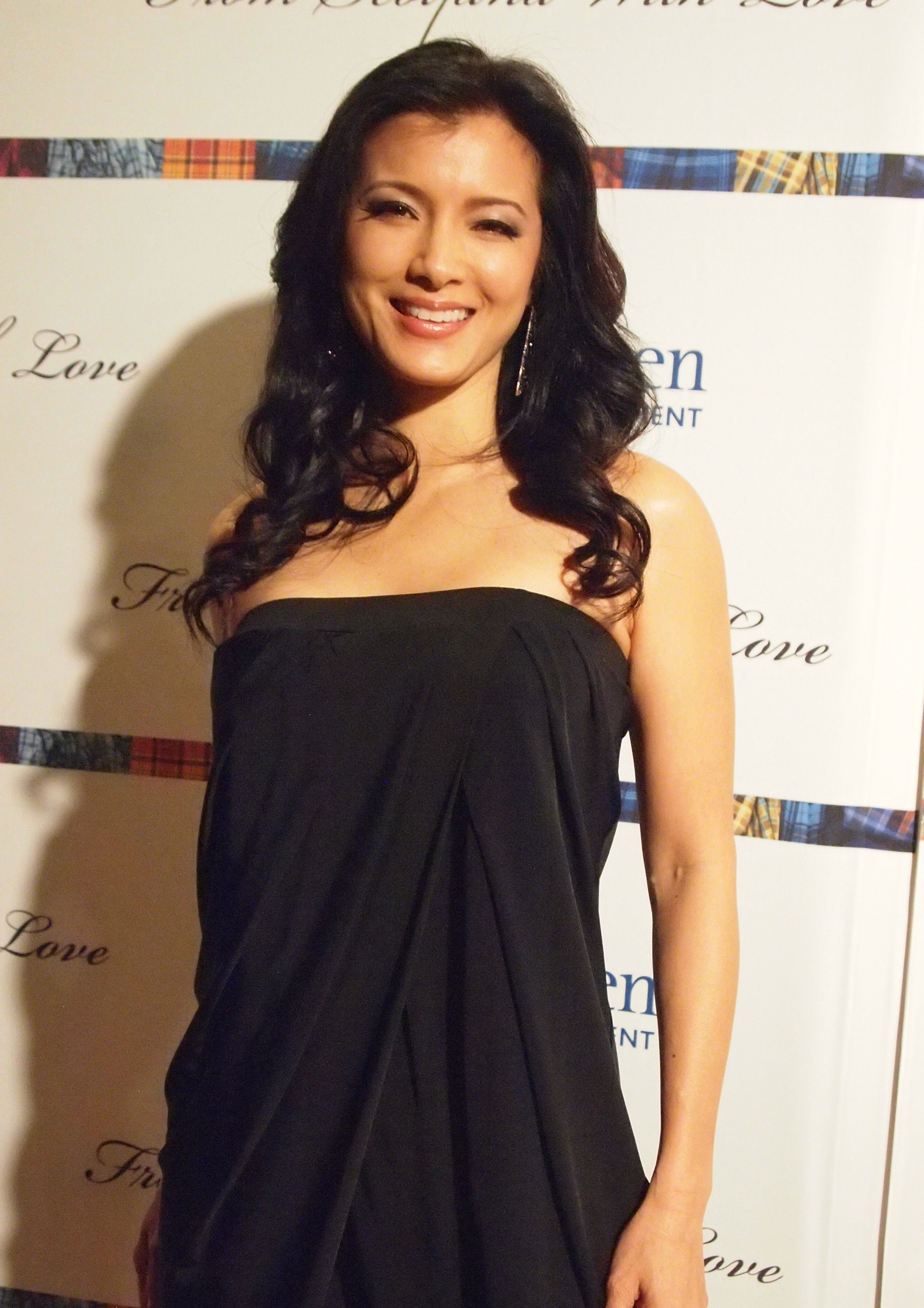
Hu in April 2013

Hu modeled in Japan and Italy. She became well known in the latter as the star of a series of television advertisements for Philadelphia brand cream cheese, playing a young Japanese college student named Kaori.

Hu won the title of Miss Hawaii USA in 1993, becoming the first former Miss Teen USA to win a Miss USA state title. In the 1993 Miss USA pageant, held in Wichita, Kansas, Hu entered the top ten in second place, after winning the preliminary interview competition and placing second in swimsuit and third in evening gown. She then made the top six, ranked second, winning the top-ten evening gown competition and placing second in swimsuit. She was eliminated in fourth place after the judges' questions, just 2/100 of a point from the final three.

=== Transition to acting ===
Hu moved to Los Angeles and began her acting career in 1987, with a guest-starring role as Mike Seaver's Hawaiian love interest on the sitcom Growing Pains. Hu followed this with appearances on various television series, including Night Court, Tour of Duty, 21 Jump Street, and Melrose Place. Her first film role was in Friday the 13th Part VIII: Jason Takes Manhattan. She followed this with a minor role in the Jim Morrison bio The Doors. In 1995 Hu starred as an undercover police officer in the film No Way Back. Hu was cast as Dr. Rae Chang on Sunset Beach for six months in 1997. Afterwards she was cast as police officers Michelle Chan in the television series Nash Bridges and Pei Pei "Grace" Chen on Martial Law. Her subsequent film appearances include The Scorpion King (2002) and Cradle 2 the Grave (2003). In X2 (2003) she appeared as Yuriko Oyama/Deathstrike, William Stryker's controlled partner.

Hu was featured in the May 2002 issue of Maxim magazine. She would be featured again in the May 2005 issue.

She was Agent Mia Chen in the last three episodes of the television series Threat Matrix in 2004. She also starred in 2005's Underclassman along with Nick Cannon and in 2006's Americanese, Undoing, and Devil's Den. During the first quarter of 2007 she completed work on the film Stilletto, followed by Farm House.

In January 2007 Hu began appearing in a full-time role on the television series In Case of Emergency. She played Kelly Lee, a Korean American woman who accidentally reunites with her high school classmates and realizes none of them grew up according to their high school plans. The show did not have a successful run and was cancelled after 12 episodes, leaving its season finale un-aired. She then appeared in the films The Air I Breathe and Shanghai Kiss. This was also the year Hu worked as the recurring voice for Stacy Hirano in the animated series Phineas and Ferb until 2014. The series originally ended in 2015, but it was later revived in 2023 and released in 2025. In 2020 she reprised her role in the animated film Phineas and Ferb the Movie: Candace Against the Universe and in the show's revival.

Hu is an avid poker fan and has frequently taken part in competitions such as the World Series of Poker and World Poker Tour, including the WPT Celebrity Charity match on March 3, 2008. She was part of HollywoodPoker.com's "Celebrity Poker Night" on May 30, 2006, and in July 2006 placed in the top 200 in the World Series of Poker Ladies Tournament, besting nearly 1,000 other competitors.

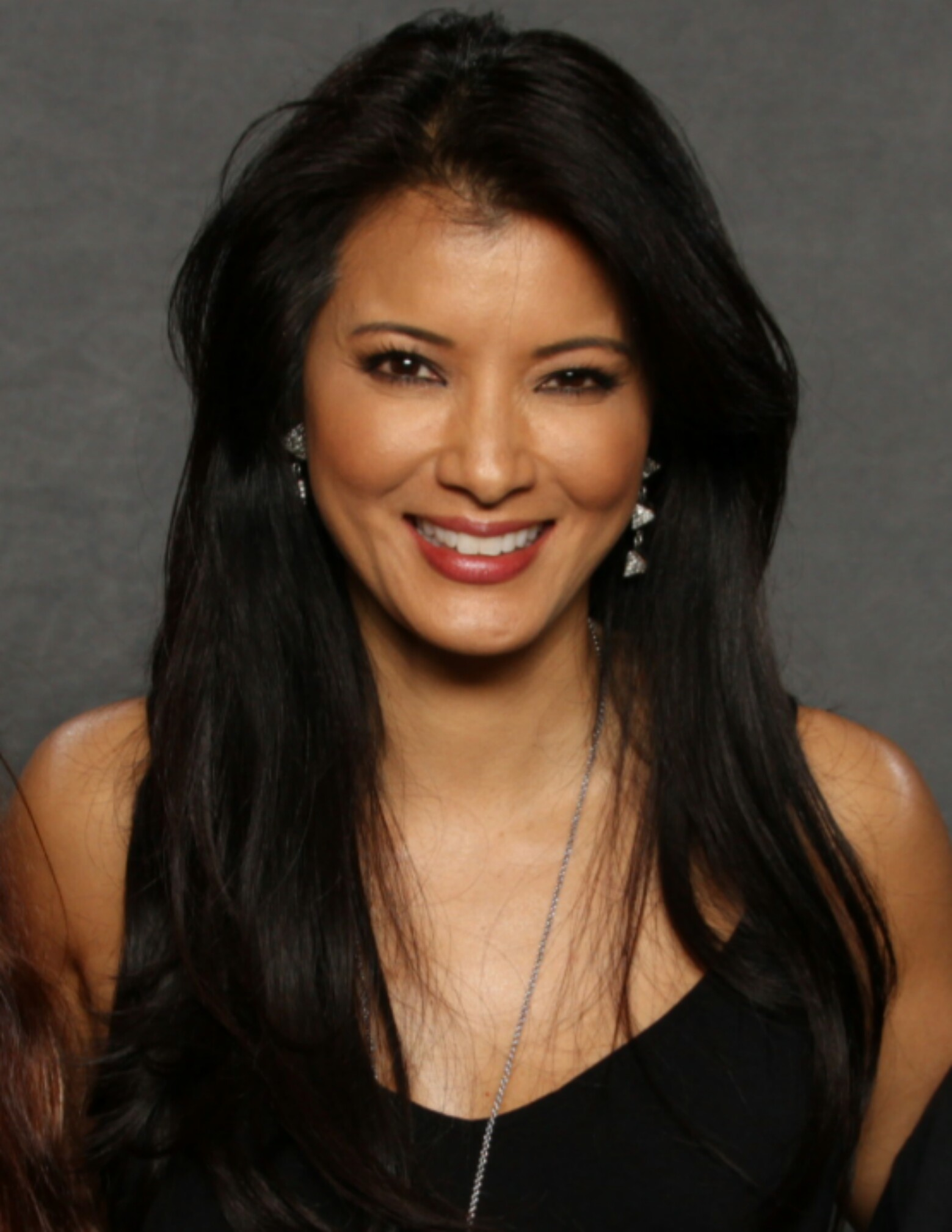
Hu in 2016

In 2009 Hu appeared in the film The Tournament as Lai-Lai Zhen. In April 2009 Hu developed the character JIA for Secret Identities: The Asian American Superhero Anthology. She was the first guest actor to cross over between the television series NCIS: Los Angeles and NCIS, playing Lee Wuan Kai in a two-episode arc within both shows. In 2010 and 2011 Hu guest-starred as a vampire named Pearl on the CW television series The Vampire Diaries.

In 2010 Hu began a recurring role on the CBS television series Hawaii Five-0 (2010 TV series) Hu was cast in the role of Karai in the animated series Teenage Mutant Ninja Turtles. She commented: "It wouldn't quite be the first time I played a ninja, I think. Yeah, I don't know why people think I'm dangerous, but for some reason, I keep getting these roles for the ninja, assassin, bodyguard, bad-girl type." In 2012 she was cast as China White/Chen Na Wei in The CW series Arrow. In 2013 she joined the cast of the series Warehouse 13 as Abigail Cho, the new owner of the Warehouse-connected B&B.

Hu provided voice talents in video games including Star Wars Knights of the Old Republic II: The Sith Lords as Visas Marr, the Sith woman who joins the Jedi Exile's party, and Batman: Arkham Origins as Lady Shiva, among the eight assassins hired by Black Mask to kill Batman (a role she reprised in the 2021 animated film Batman: Soul of the Dragon). In a personal first, she lent both her face and voice to Battlefield Hardline's in-game character Khai Minh Dao, who partnered alongside the protagonist in roughly half of the game levels.

In May 2015 Hu appeared in a television commercial for Viagra.

In 2023 Hu joined the cast of East New York.

== Activism ==
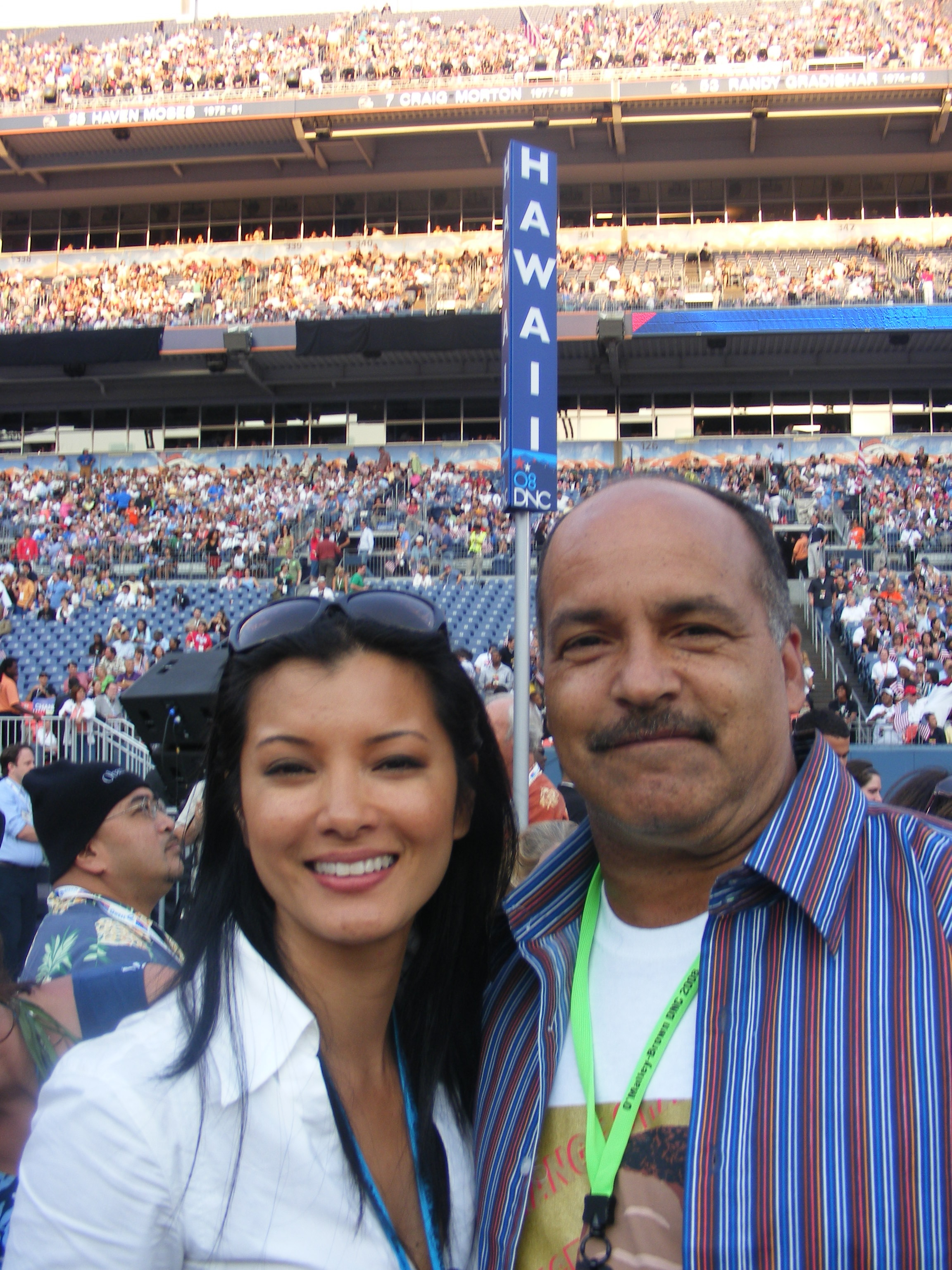
Kelly Hu at the 2008 Democratic National Convention in Denver with Obama Delegate Curt Anderson.

Hu has supported the Center for Asian Americans United for Self Empowerment, and in 2004 she starred in a public service announcement for them titled "The Least Likely" to encourage young Asian Americans to register and vote.

In 2007 Hu was a driver in the Toyota Pro/Celebrity Race, a national fund-raising program supporting children's hospitals throughout the United States. In April 2011 Hu was a celebrity host for Save the Children's "Caring for Japan's Keiki," a benefit for Japanese earthquake and tsunami victims. Also in 2011 she hosted a Celebrity Poker Tournament for Best Buddies International, a charity that she has supported for several years. In January 2008 Hu participated in a video for Barack Obama produced by will.i.am called "Yes We Can". She campaigned for Obama in Hawaii in the run-up to the February 19, 2008, Democratic caucuses. In February 2008 Hu also appeared in another viral video in support of Obama, "Sí Se Puede Cambiar", written and performed by Andrés Useche, directed by Eric Byler. She was the emcee of the Asian American Action Fund's annual fundraiser on June 10, 2008. She was present at the 2008 Democratic National Convention.

Hu has been active in protecting the Hawaiian ecology. She supported Reef Check Hawaii by running and successfully completing the Honolulu Marathon to raise awareness for the organization. She also gave support to the Shark Fin Ban which took effect in Hawaii in July 2010.

== Filmography ==
=== Film ===
Year	Title	Role	Notes
1989	Friday the 13th Part VIII: Jason Takes Manhattan	Eva Watanabe	
1991	The Doors	Dorothy	
1991	Harley Davidson and the Marlboro Man	Suzie	
1993	Surf Ninjas	Ro-May	
1995	No Way Back	Seiko Kobayashi	
1995	Strange Days	Anchor Woman	
1996	Star Command	Ens. Yukiko Fujisaki	Television film
1997	Fakin' da Funk	Kwee-Me	
2002	The Scorpion King	Cassandra	
2003	Cradle 2 the Grave	Sona	
2003	X2	Yuriko Oyama / Lady Deathstrike	
2004	The Librarian: Quest for the Spear	Lana	Television film
2005	Underclassman	Lisa Brooks	
2005	Mayday	Sharon Crandall	Television film
2006	Americanese	Brenda Nishitani	
2006	Undoing	Vera	
2006	Devil's Den	Caitlin	
2007	Shanghai Kiss	Micki Yang	
2007	Succubus: Hell-Bent	Detective Pei	Direct-to-video
2007	The Air I Breathe	Jiyoung	
2008	Stiletto	Detective Hanover	
2008	Dead Space: Downfall	Shen	Voice, direct-to-video
2008	Farm House	Lilith	
2008	Dim Sum Funeral	Cindy	
2009	Scooby-Doo! and the Samurai Sword	Miyumi/Miss Mirimoto	Voice, direct-to-video
2009	The Tournament	Lai Lai Zhen	Direct-to-video
2010	Batman: Under the Red Hood	Ms. Li	Voice, direct-to-video
2011	What Women Want	Girl In Lotto Commercial	
2011	Almost Perfect	Vanessa Lee	
2011	Green Lantern: Emerald Knights	Laira Omoto	Voice, direct-to-video
2011	Phineas and Ferb the Movie: Across the 2nd Dimension	Stacy Hirano	Voice, television film
2012	White Frog	May Chung	
2013	The Haumana	Linda	
2013	They Die by Dawn	Polly Bemis	
2014	Age of Tomorrow	Dr. Gordon	Direct-to-video
2014	High School Possession	Denise Brady	Television film
2015	Death Valley	Greenstreet	
2016	Beyond the Game	Lee	
2016	Finding Kukan	Young Li Ling-Ai	
2016	Kepler's Dream	Irene	
2017	Maximum Impact	Kate	
2018	F.R.E.D.I.	Dr. Andi Palmer	
2018	Christmas Wonderland	Julia	Television film
2018	Lucy in the Sky	Dr. Susan	Short
2019	Go Back to China	May Li	
2020	Phineas and Ferb the Movie: Candace Against the Universe	Stacy Hirano	Voice
2021	Batman: Soul of the Dragon	Lady Shiva	Voice, direct-to-video
2021	Finding 'Ohana	Leilani	
2021	Extinct	News Reporter	Voice
2021	List of a Lifetime	Brenda Lee	Television film
2021	Painted Beauty	Carla	
2022	Catwoman: Hunted	Cheshire	Voice, direct-to-video
2022	Fallen Angels Murder Club: Friends to Die For	Joelle Wallace	Television film
2022	Fallen Angels Murder Club: Heroes and Felons	Joelle Wallace	Television film
2023	Mortal Kombat Legends: Cage Match	Ashrah	Voice, direct-to-video
2024	Watchmen Chapter I	Vietnamese Woman, Yvonne	Voice, direct-to-video

=== Television ===
Year	Title	Role	Notes
1987–88	Growing Pains	Melia	Recurring Cast: Season 3
1988	Night Court	Krista	Episode: "Danny Got His Gun"
1989	Tour of Duty	Vietnamese DJ	Episode: "Saigon"
1989	21 Jump Street	Kim Van Luy	Episode: "The Dragon and the Angel"
1990	CBS Schoolbreak Special	Emily	Episode: "American Eyes"
1992	The Bold and the Beautiful	Trish	Episode: "Episode #1.1272" & "#1.1275"
1993	Raven	Pele	Episode: "Heat"
1994	Burke's Law	Dawn	Episode: "Who Killed the Beauty Queen?"
1994	Melrose Place	Andrea	Episode: "Parting Glances"
1994	Renegade	Kathy Maruyama	Episode: "Black Wind"
1995	Maybe This Time	Jennifer	Episode: "Please Re-Lease Me"
1996	Murder One	Natalie Cheng	Episode: "Chapter Nineteen" & "Chapter Twenty"
1996	The Sentinel	Christine Hong	Episode: "Cypher"
1996	One West Waikiki	Dr. Midori	Episode: "Battle of the Titans"
1996	Pacific Blue	Wendy Trang	Episode: "The Enemy Within"
1996	Mr. & Mrs. Smith	Ms. Jones	Episode: "The Second Episode"
1997	Sunset Beach	Rae Chang	Regular Cast
1997–98	Nash Bridges	Inspector Michelle Chan	Main Cast: Season 3, Recurring Cast: Season 4
1998	Malcolm & Eddie	Wendy	Episode: "Car Trouble"
1998–2000	Martial Law	Detective Grace "Pei Pei" Chen	Main Cast
1999–2002	Hollywood Squares	Herself/Panelist	Recurring Guest
2001	The Test	Herself/Panelist	Episode: "The Superstitious Test"
2003	Mad TV	Herself	Episode: "Episode #8.15"
2003	Players	Herself	Episode: "Football Player$"
2003	Boomtown	Rachel Durrel	Recurring Cast: Season 2
2004	Biography	Herself	Episode: "The Rock"
2004	Threat Matrix	Agent Mia Chen	Recurring Cast
2005	Love Lounge	Herself	Episode: "Love for Sale"
2005–06	CSI: NY	Detective Kaile Maka	Recurring Cast: Season 1–2
2005–18	Robot Chicken	Olive Oyl, Timmy Turner, Various voices,	Voice, recurring role
2006	Las Vegas	Natalie Ko	Episode: "Died in Plain Sight"
2006	The Book of Daniel	Kristine Ho	Episode: "Revelations" & "Withdrawal"
2007	Afro Samurai	Okiku	Voice, episode: "The Dream Reader"
2007	In Case of Emergency	Kelly Lee	Main Cast
2007–2014, 2025–present	Phineas and Ferb	Stacy Hirano, various voices	Voice, recurring role
2008	Law & Order: Special Victims Unit	Kelly Sun	Episode: "Smut"
2008–09	Army Wives	Major Jordana Davis	Recurring Cast: Season 2, Guest: Season 3
2009	Numbers	Alice Chen	Episode: "Trouble in Chinatown"
2009	The Spectacular Spider-Man	Sha Shan Nguyen	Voice, recurring role (season 2)
2009	In Plain Sight	Ahn Li	Episode: "Let's Get It Ahn"
2009	NCIS: Los Angeles	Lee Wuan Kai	Episode: "Killshot"
2009	NCIS	Lee Wuan Kai	Episode: "Endgame"
2010	Iron Chef America	Herself/ICA Judge	Episode: "Morimoto vs. Cohen: Broccoli"
2010–11	Hawaii Five-0	Laura Hills	Recurring Cast: Season 1
2010–11	The Vampire Diaries	Pearl Zhu	Recurring Cast: Season 1, Guest: Season 3
2011	CSI: Crime Scene Investigation	Angie Salinger	Episode: "Bittersweet"
2011–21	Young Justice	Cheshire, Paula Crock / Huntress, Royal Guard #1	Voice, recurring role (seasons 1–4)
2012	Fairly Legal	Lydia	Episode: "Shine a Light"
2012	Breakout Kings	Kendra Park	Episode: "SEALd Fate"
2012–19	Arrow	China Na Wei / China White	Recurring Cast: Season 1 & 3, Guest: Season 2, 5, 7 and 8; 13 episodes
2013	EcoDivas TV	Herself	Episode: "Reviews and Testimonials"
2013	Hell's Kitchen	Herself	Episode: "8 Chefs Compete"
2013	Super Power Beat Down	Herself	Episode: "Wolverine vs. Predator"
2013	Castle	Scarlet Jones	Episode: "Death Gone Crazy"
2013–14	Warehouse 13	Abigail Cho	Recurring Cast: Season 4, Guest: Season 5
2013–17	Teenage Mutant Ninja Turtles	Karai	Voice, recurring role
2014	Model Turned Superstar	Herself	Episode: "Dubai"
2014	The 100	Callie 'Cece' Cartwig	Episode: "Pilot"
2015	Being Mary Jane	Alana	Recurring Cast: Season 3
2017	Battle of the Network Stars	Herself/Contestant	Episode: "Cops vs. TV Sitcoms"
2017	Gap Year	Vanessa	Episode: "Nepal: The End"
2017	NCIS: New Orleans	Dr. Anna Yoon	Episode: "The Accident"
2017–22	The Orville	Union Admiral Ozawa	Recurring Cast: Season 1–3
2017–2018	Stretch Armstrong and the Flex Fighters	Miya Kimanyan, various voices	Voice, recurring role
2018–20	Rapunzel's Tangled Adventure	Adira	Voice, recurring role (seasons 2–3)
2020	L.A.'s Finest	Angela Turner	Recurring Cast: Season 2
2020	Pete the Cat	Bali Burrow	Voice, episode: "Super Surfboard Smash"
2022	Solar Opposites	Lervus' Wife	Voice, episode: "99 Ships"
2022–24	The Legend of Vox Machina	Dr. Anna Ripley	Voice, recurring role
2023	BMF	Detective Veronica Jin	Main Cast: Season 2-current
2023	East New York	Allison Cha	Recurring Cast
2023	Abominable and the Invisible City	Great Watcher	Voice, episode: "Please Hold While We Connect You"
2024	Gremlins: The Wild Batch	The Lioness	Voice
2025	Bat-Fam	Rumbler / Ophelia	Voice

=== Music videos ===
Year	Artist	Song
2008	will.i.am	"Yes We Can"
2012	Daughtry	"Outta My Head"

=== Documentary ===
Year	Title
2014	Extinction Soup
2016	Finding Kukan

=== Video games ===
Year	Title	Role	Notes
1997	D.A. Pursuit of Justice	Cindy Chen	
2004	Star Wars Knights of the Old Republic II: The Sith Lords	Visas Marr	
2006	X-Men: The Official Game	Lady Deathstrike	Likeness only
2008	Command & Conquer: Red Alert 3	Suki Toyama	
2008	Fracture	Mariko	
2009	Afro Samurai	Okiku, Osachi	
2009	Ninja Blade	Ryoko Kurokawa	
2009	Terminator Salvation	Wells, Resistance Soldiers	
2012	Sleeping Dogs	Inspector Jane Teng	
2013	Teenage Mutant Ninja Turtles	Karai	
2013	Batman: Arkham Origins	Lady Shiva	
2013	Young Justice: Legacy	Cheshire	
2014	Teenage Mutant Ninja Turtles: Danger of the Ooze	Karai	
2015	Battlefield Hardline	Khai Minh Dao	Voice and motion capture
2015	Infinite Crisis	Katana	
2015	Mortal Kombat X	D'Vorah, Sindel, Frost	
2019	Mortal Kombat 11	D'Vorah	
2022	Guild Wars 2	Captain Mai Trin, Soo-Won	
2023	Mortal Kombat 1	Li Mei, Madam Bo	
2024	Teenage Mutant Ninja Turtles Arcade: Wrath of the Mutants	Karai	Exclusive from home console version.
2025	Nicktoons & The Dice of Destiny	Karai	
2025	Marvel's Deadpool VR	Lady Deathstrike	
2026	Marvel's Wolverine	Tyger Tiger	Voice and motion capture

Awards and achievements
Preceded by Chersie Haugen	Miss Teen USA; 1985	Succeeded by Allison Brown
Preceded by Malia Yamamura	Miss Hawaii Teen USA; 1985	Succeeded by Michelle Hardin
