= Rey Scott =

American journalist, filmmaker, and cinematographer

- Born: January 9, 1905; St. Louis, Missouri, U.S.
- Died: February 12, 1992 (aged 87); Marietta, Georgia, U.S.
- Occupations: Journalist; Documentary filmmaker; Cinematographer
- Years active: 1937–1955
- Known for: Kukan (1941); Report from the Aleutians (1943)
- Awards: Academy Honorary Award (1941)

Rey Scott (1905–1992) was an American journalist, documentary filmmaker, and cinematographer. He is best known for directing Kukan, a pioneering color documentary about China's resistance during the Second Sino-Japanese War. His later work documented U.S. military operations in the Aleutian Islands Campaign during World War II.

== Early life ==
Scott was born in St. Louis, Missouri. Census records show his family later moved to Los Angeles, where he began his career as a journalist and photographer in the 1930s.

== Career ==
=== Pre-war work ===
In 1937, Scott relocated to Hawaii as a journalist for the Honolulu Advertiser, where he documented tourist life and collaborated with labor activist Roy Cummings during newspaper unionization efforts.

=== Kukan and wartime documentation ===
Partnering with Chinese-American playwright Li Ling-Ai, Scott co-produced Kukan (苦干, "courage") using a handheld 16mm camera. He had to smuggle it out of China by inserting it into a bamboo pole.

The film earned a 1941 Honorary Oscar, with the Academy citing "exceptional courage and enterprise in photographic documentation".

=== Other works ===
Scott produced Last Panda to Leave China about a baby panda he personally transported to the Chicago Zoo.

== Military service ==
After Pearl Harbor, Scott joined the U.S. Army Signal Corps under Captain John Huston, filming combat missions over Kiska Island for Report from the Aleutians (1943). His footage contributed to the film's New York Film Critics Circle Award and Oscar nomination.

== Legacy ==
Scott's Kukan remained lost until 2009 when a damaged print was discovered in Hawaii. Its restoration by the Academy Film Archive revived interest in his work. The Naval Air Station Fort Lauderdale Museum preserves his personal archives.

== See also ==
- List of World War II documentary films
