= Women's Educational Equity Act =

1974 law of the United States Congress

The Women's Educational Equity Act (WEEA) of 1974 is one of the several landmark laws passed by the United States Congress outlining federal protections against the gender discrimination of women in education (educational equity). WEEA was enacted as Section 513 of P.L. 93-380. Introduced in the United States House of Representatives by Congresswoman Patsy Mink of Hawaiʻi, the legislation was conceived and drafted by Arlene Horowitz, a staff assistant to the education subcommittee on which Mink served. WEEA was intended to combat sex-role stereotyping in elementary and secondary schools.

== Passage ==
The legislation was first proposed by Rep. Mink in response to efforts by other legislators to weaken Title IX, a statute prohibiting sex discrimination in federally funded education programs and activities that had passed in 1972.

Billie Jean King, a female professional tennis player, used her sports celebrity to speak in favor of the Women's Educational Equity Act of 1973 (WEEA) before it became a law. On November 9, 1973, King testified before the United States Senate Committee on Health, Education, Labor and Pensions and spoke about problems in women's sports. King stated that the benefit of sports was denied to women in educational programs, such as budgets for women's sports being less than men's sports. King's testimony brought attention to issues in women's sports and helped with the consideration of the Women's Educational Equity Act.

Mink's bill was defeated in the House, but Senator Walter Mondale attached the bill to the broader Elementary and Secondary Education Act (H.R. 69) being debated in the Senate, and Mink worked to have this version approved in the cross-chamber conference committee. The WEEA was passed as part of the Elementary and Secondary Education Amendments and was signed into law on August 21, 1974.

== Content ==
The Women's Educational Equity Act authorizes grants “…to develop nonsexist curricula, personnel training programs, and vocational and career counseling.” In addition to these grants, the improvement of physical education programs is also included. These funds helped education facilities to meet the requirements of Title IX.

== Implementation ==
In 1982, Leslie Wolfe, WEEA's director when Ronald Reagan was elected to the U.S. presidency, was transferred out of that position and people aligned with Phyllis Schlafly's Eagle Forum were brought in to review grant proposals being considered for WEEA funds. In 1984, Congress rewrote the WEEA legislation making its mission and purpose more explicit and therefore keeping its actions true to its original goal.

During the Reagan Administration, the assistant secretary of education, Jean Benish, implemented a review process which included all walks of people and provided a fair and equitable grant review process which was all-inclusive of women's issues. In 1984, Congress rewrote the WEEA legislation making its mission and purpose more explicit.

In 2003, the George W. Bush administration ended federal funds for WEEA's Resource Center, a mechanism for collection and sharing of information about gender equity programs.

The last documented funding for WEEA was in 2010. For the fiscal year 2018, the President's budget does not request funding for WEEA.

== See also ==
- Title IX
- Equal Rights Amendment
