= Sí Se Puede Cambiar =

Single by Andres Useche
- Released: February 22, 2008 (YouTube)
- Recorded: House of Doom Studios, Los Angeles
- Genre: Folk, acoustic, political
- Length: 4:23
- Songwriter: Andres Useche
- Producer: United For Obama

"Sí, Se Puede Cambiar" (English translation: Yes, we can change) is a song and music video created in support of Sen. Barack Obama's 2008 presidential campaign. However, the video has no official ties to the Obama campaign. The song was written by Andres Useche. The video, which features Useche performing, was directed by Eric Byler, Warren Fu and Andres Useche, and was released on February 22, 2008 on YouTube under the username "United For Obama".

The video attracted national and international attention and through 2008 Andres Useche accepted invitations to do radio, newspaper and TV interviews in which he promoted Barack Obama's campaign.

The phrase "Sí se puede" originated with the United Farm Workers, which adopted it as the union's official slogan in 1972. It subsequently gained wider currency among other American labor unions and social justice activists.

== Content ==
The original Spanish language music video, with English subtitles, was the creation of a volunteer network of Obama supporters known as United For Obama. The creation and release of the video was originally intended to influence Spanish-speaking voters in the Texas democratic primary. The video, and song, criticizes the Bush administration while presenting Obama as the candidate for change in the 2008 election. The video features footage of Useche singing and performing on acoustic guitar, intercut with images critical of Bush—images intended to exemplify some of his failed policies, such as soldiers in Iraq and victims of Hurricane Katrina, and images in support of Obama, such as volunteers at work for his campaign, and supporters at his political rallies. Personalities who appear in the video include California State Senator Gil Cedillo, Wendy Carrillo, and actors Kelly Hu, Ken Leung and Kal Penn.

== Viewership ==
Since the original posting on YouTube, the video has been re-posted a number of times by other users. On April 8, 2008, "Si Se Puede Cambiar" was chosen by YouTube to represent Obama in the first ever "Trendsetter Tuesday". The video was featured on the main page of the site along with videos about the other US presidential candidates. "Si Se Puede Cambiar" quickly reached 350,000 views and maintained a rating of 4/5 stars, beating the scores for the Clinton and McCain videos. The video had been watched in 193 countries. Versions of the video with subtitles in German, French, Chinese, Vietnamese, Korean and Arabic have also been released.

== Video production credits ==
- Written and performed by Andres Useche
- Directed by Eric Byler, Warren Fu and Andres Useche.
- Video produced by Annabel Park and Eric Byler
- Edited by Warren Fu
- Videography by Eric Byler, Diego Galindo, Amyn Kaderali, Jeff Man, David Hou, Annabel Park, and Rueben Aaronson.
- Song recorded and mixed by Tom Von Doom
- Video post supervision by Loni Pham.

== Appearances ==
The following public figures are featured in the music video, either on newly shot video, archival footage, or still photographs (time indicates first appearance):

- Andres Useche - 00:01
- César Chávez - 00:12
- Robert F. Kennedy - 00:17
- George W. Bush - 01:13
- Dick Cheney - 01:16
- John McCain - 01:22
- Barack Obama - 01:27
- Eric Byler - 01:54
- Annabel Park - 01:58
- Gil Cedillo -
- Ted Kennedy - 02:47
- Ken Leung - 03:21
- Kal Penn - 03:45
- Kelly Hu - 03:47
- Michelle Obama - 04:05
