= Finding Kukan =

- Directed by: Robin Lung
- Written by: Robin Lung; Shirley Thompson
- Produced by: Kimberlee Bassford; Douglas K.T. Ho; Robin Lung; Shirley Thompson
- Starring: Daniel Dae Kim (voice of Rey Scott); Kelly Hu (voice of Li-Ling Ai)
- Cinematography: Frank Ayala; Stanford Chang; Ron Darby; Ann Kaneko; Andrew Yuyi Truong\
- Edited by: Robin Lung; Shirley Thompson
- Music by: Miriam Cutler
- Release date: November 5, 2016 (Hawaii Film Festival)
- Running time: 75 minutes
- Country: United States
- Language: English
- Budget: $60 million

Finding Kukan is a 2016 feature-length documentary investigating the story of Chinese Hawaii-born producer Li Ling-Ai, the female co-producer of the film Kukan (1941).

== Release ==
After its world premiere at the Hawaii International Film Festival on May 5, 2016, Finding Kukan was screened at DOC NYC, CAAAMFest, the Seattle International Film Festival and at film festivals, conferences, churches and special events in Chicago, Los Angeles, San Diego, Atlanta, Vancouver, Winnipeg, Boston, Philadelphia, Washington, DC, Baltimore, Fresno, Mendocino, Oakland and Bend, among others.

The film was broadcast September 7, 2018, on PBS television as part of the America ReFramed documentary series.

== Accolades ==
	Ceremony Date	Category	Nominee	Result	Ref(s)
Hawaii International Film Festival	2016	Documentary Jury Special Mention	Finding Kukan		
Hawaii International Film Festival	2016	Special Mention, Women In Film	Robin Lung		
CAAMFest	2017	Best Documentary		Honorable Mention	
Los Angeles Asian Pacific Film Festival	2017	Best Documentary			
UMass Boston Film Series		Courage in Cinema Award			
Boston Asian American Film Festival		Audience Award			
Boston Asian American Film Festival		Honorable Mention Feature Documentary			
