= Early Childhood Education Act =

The Early Childhood Education Act is the name of various landmark laws passed by the United States Congress outlining federal programs and funding for childhood education from pre-school through kindergarten. The first such act was introduced in the United States House of Representatives by Congresswoman Patsy Mink of Hawaiʻi in the 1960s. The theory behind the act is that the years before a child reaches kindergarten are the most critical to influence learning. Many children do not have access to early education before entering kindergarten. The goal of the act is to provide a comprehensive set of services for children from birth until they enter kindergarten.

== Legislative history ==
Since the Early Childhood Education Act was initiated in the 60s, various laws have been passed and continue to be passed as part of the Early Childhood Education Act to better prepare young children for school. These programs were intended to help children in the pre-kindergarten years to be more successful once starting school.

=== Head start ===
Founded in 1965 by Jule Sugarman, Head start was one of the first programs initiated as a result of the Early Childhood Education Act. Its goal is to enhance the social and cognitive development of children offering services in the area of education, health, social and nutrition. This program was originally intended to be a "catch up summer school" that would teach the children from low-income families everything that they need to know before starting school in only a few weeks span. The program has since been redefined and acts have been passed for Head Start programs to keep progressing towards providing better services to pre-kindergarten children from low-income families.

=== National Academy of Early Childhood Programs ===
In 1985 the National Association for the Education of Young Children established the National Academy of Early Childhood Programs for voluntary accreditation according to health, safety and education standards. This program was intended to create a more reliable standard of accreditation for early childhood education programs. The program's goal is to promote quality and excellence in early childhood programs across the United States. There are NAECP located all across the country that offer classes in order to become an accredited ECE program.

=== Even Start Program ===
In 1988, The U.S. Department of Education established the Even Start Program to improve parent and family literacy at home. This program was designed to improve parents literacy so they can ultimately help their children become literate and reach their full potential as learners. It integrates early childhood education, adult education and family literacy.

=== No Child Left Behind Act ===
The No Child Left Behind Act was proposed by George W. Bush and passed by United States House of Representatives in 2001. The Act requires that all public schools receive federal funding to administer a standardized test annually to assess if students have made Adequate Yearly Progress (AYP). Schools must provide services to students who do not meet AYP in order to help them succeed and pass AYP the following year.

=== Preschool for All Initiative ===
In 2013, President Obama proposed the Preschool for All initiative. The goal of this program is to expand funding in all fifty states to allow low and mid-income families the opportunity to provide their four-year-old children with high quality preschool.

== Provisions of the act ==
Laws under the Early Childhood Education Act offer comprehensive services for children from birth through age five. Programs should meet one the following goals: ·Provide access to high-quality infant and toddler care

·Expand voluntary home visit early learning program s

·Develop partnerships with states to provide high-quality preschool for low and middle-income families

== Current programs ==
Early Reading First was established as part of the No Child Left Behind Act. It provides competitive grants to fund the development of model programs that aim to prepare children for school. The Special Education Preschool Grants program provides grants to states to fund special educational services to children 3 to 5 with disabilities. The Special Education Grants for Infants and Families grant program assists states in implementing services for children with disabilities from birth to 2 years old. The Early Childhood Educator Professional Development Program is a competitive grant program that gives the opportunity to professionally develop skills to educators and caregivers working in low-income areas.

== Research and evaluations ==
=== Research ===
The Preschool Curriculum Evaluation Research program evaluates the efficiency of current preschool curricula in order to address the lack of systematic evaluations currently used. The data collected includes child assessments, parent interviews, teacher interviews and classroom observations. Evaluations were made to commonly assess the types of assessments that preschool programs across the country were giving their children before they left and went to kindergarten. These evaluations were focused on the fact that preschools were not assessing children on a rigorous scale that efficiently prepared them to enter grade school. What children learn and the skills they gain in Pre-Kindergarten and Kindergarten determine how well they will succeed academically in the next few years that follow.

The National Institute for Early Childhood Research is an institute that concentrates on using research to support and enhance Early Childhood programs in the United States. This institute has been using research to promote a higher education for young children since 2002. They are currently doing research on several projects.

=== Evaluations ===
The 'Even Start Classroom Literacy Interventions and Outcomes Study is a controlled study that assesses the contribution of the enhanced parenting component of the program. This program was created in 1989. The focus of this program was to help the parents of low-income families in order to improve the literacy skills of their children. By increasing the parents' knowledge and skills needed for reading and writing, the literacy skills of their young children would most likely increase as well. It focuses on evaluating whether focused literacy instruction combined with parent education will provide better outcomes than current programs.

The Early Reading First National Evaluation assesses the impact of the program on children's language, literacy outcomes and preschools’ literacy instruction. The main focus of this study was to give the children of low-income families the opportunity to gain the necessary academic skills need to succeed in school. The study compares schools’ programs who received funding from the Early reading grant and those who did not.
