= Kalaheo High School =

Coordinates: 21°24.591′N 157°45.359′W

Kalāheo High School

Location
- 730 Iliaina Street; Kailua, Hawaii 96734; United States

Information
- Type: Public, Co-educational
- Established: 1973
- Sister school: Otake High School
- School district: Windward District
- Principal: James Rippard
- Staff: 49.00 (FTE)
- Grades: 9-12
- Enrollment: 856 (2022-2023)
- Student to teacher ratio: 17.47
- Colors: Blue and orange
- Athletics: Oahu Interscholastic Association
- Mascot: Mustang
- Rival: James B. Castle High School Kailua High School
- Accreditation: 2016
- Yearbook: 2048
- Military: United States Navy JROTC
- Website: http://www.kalaheohigh.org/

Kalāheo High School is a public high school in Kailua CDP, City and County of Honolulu, Hawaiʻi, United States, on the island of Oʻahu.

The school building opened as Kalāheo Intermediate School in 1966, but was repurposed as a high school in 1973. The school mascot is the Mustang, and the school colors are blue and orange. Some graduating classes have had all blue or all orange graduation gowns and caps.

The campus has the glazed ceramic tile sculpture Spirit of the Koʻolaus by Claude Horan.

== Academics ==
As of 2024, the school is ranked #3,067 nationally and #9 in the state on US News & World Report.

Per the Board of Education, the school requires a total of 24 credits to graduate. These are six credits in electives, four credits in English, four credits in social studies, three credits in mathematics, three credits in science, two credits in either a foreign language, fine arts, or a Career and Technical pathway, one credit in physical education, and half a credit in health.

For dual-credit, the school offers Advanced Placement (AP) classes. As of the 2021-2022 school year, 51% of students took the AP Exam, with a 34% passing rate.

== Extracurricular activities ==
As of the 2024-2025 school year, the school has a total of 21 clubs. Notable organization-based clubs include CyberPatriot, International Committee of the Red Cross, Key Club, National Honors Society, and Model United Nations. Notable clubs based on topics include art and photo, artificial intelligence, bubble tea, chess, Dungeons & Dragons (D&D), esports, film, hiking, newspaper, lacrosse, mathletes, Model United Nations, japanese culture, and surfing.

== Notable alumni ==
Listed alphabetically by last name (year of graduation):

- Mike Akiu (1980) - football player
- Ashley Hobbs (2007) - Playboy Playmate, December 2010
- Kelvin Jones (2003) - director of the LSU Tiger Marching Band. 1st African American head marching band director in SEC history.
- Stacy Kamano (1992) - actress
- Irie Love (2000) - reggae singer
- Agnes Lum - model, attended when it was Kalaheo Intermediate School
- Robin Lung (1978) - filmmaker
- Siupeli Malamala - football offensive lineman
- Jonah Ray (2000) - comedian, writer
- Christine Snyder (1987) - United Airlines Flight 93
- Justin Young (1996) - singer and songwriter of Hawaiian, pop, and reggae music
- Jason Zada - film director

== Athletics ==
Kalaheo High School competes in a variety of sports. They compete in the Oahu Interscholastic Association. These sports include:

- Air Riflery
- Baseball (JV & Varsity)
- Basketball
- Bowling
- Cheerleading
- Cross-Country
- Football (JV & Varsity)
- Golf
- Judo
- Paddling
- Soccer
- Softball (JV & Varsity)
- Soft Tennis
- Swimming
- Tennis (JV & Varsity)
- Track and Field
- Volleyball
- Water Polo
- Wrestling
