= Andrés Useche =

Colombian American writer and director

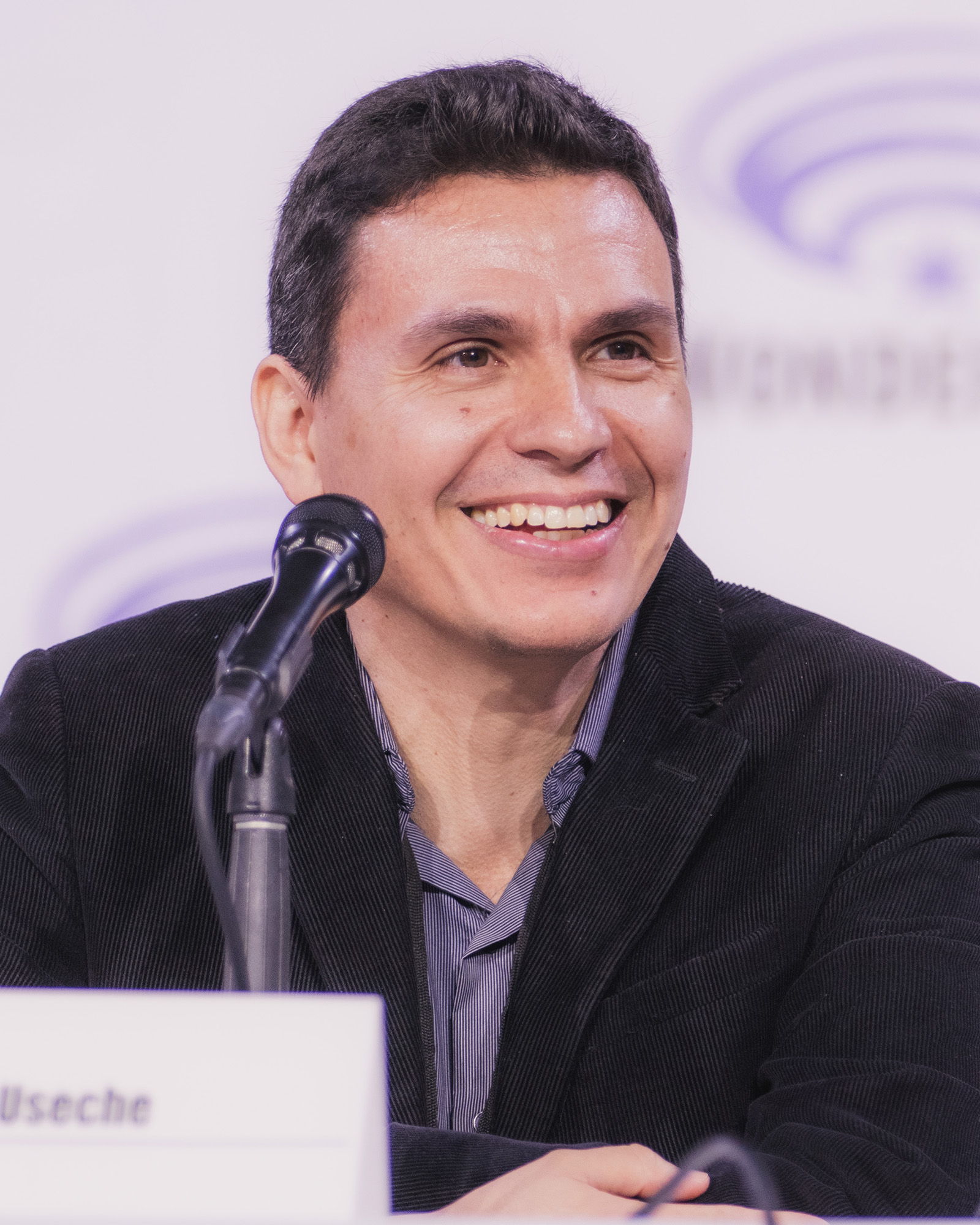
- Useche in 2026

Background information
- Origin: Manizales, Colombia
- Occupations: Singer; songwriter; film director; writer
- Instruments: Vocals; guitar; piano
- Website: https://www.facebook.com/andres1/

Andrés Useche is a Colombian American writer, film director, graphic artist, singer-songwriter and activist.

== Early life ==
Andres Useche was born in Manizales, Colombia. He wrote and drew his first published political cartoon, "Soy Libre", at age 11. In high school, he won the Colombian Ministry of Culture Individual Creation Prize in Graphic Arts with his graphic novel Vana Espuma ("Idle Mist"). Upon high school graduation Useche composed music and scored documentaries.

After graduating as a visual designer with emphasis on Film from the Universidad de Caldas, Useche moved to Los Angeles, California to work as a filmmaker, eventually gaining dual citizenship.

== Career ==
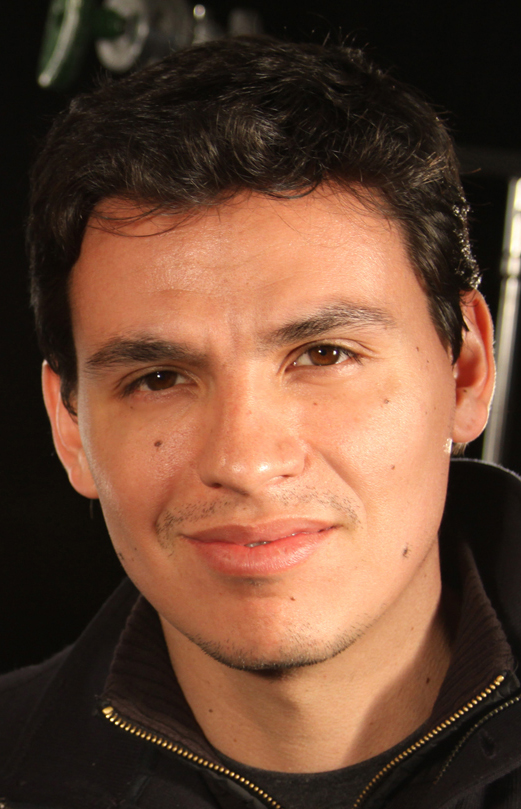
Useche in 2010

Useche wrote, directed, edited, scored and starred in a short film adaptation of his graphic novel Idle Mist on a minuscule $100 budget. The short won the Best Fiction Film, Best Screenplay, and Best Actress César Awards, and was also nominated for Best Actor and Best Music.

In 2008, in support of Sen. Barack Obama's presidential campaign, Useche volunteered, sang and spoke at rallies and wrote, performed and co-directed in the viral video "Si Se Puede Cambiar", a Spanish language music video also co-directed by Eric Byler and Warren Fu, which debuted on YouTube on February 22, from the group United For Obama. On April 8, 2008, "Si Se Puede Cambiar" was chosen by YouTube to represent Obama in the first-ever "Trendsetter Tuesday".

Andres continued pushing for immigration reform in the United States and wrote the song "Dream to Belong" in direct support of the DREAM Act.
