= Patsy Mink: Ahead of the Majority =

- Directed by: Kimberlee Bassford
- Written by: Kimberlee Bassford
- Produced by: Kimberlee Bassford
- Cinematography: Michael Chin
- Edited by: Kimberlee Bassford; Jean-Philippe Boucicaut
- Music by: Joel Goodman
- Production company: Making Waves Films
- Distributed by: Women Make Movies
- Release date: October 12, 2008 (Hawaii International Film Festival)

Patsy Mink: Ahead of the Majority is a 2008 documentary film that was written and directed by Kimberlee Bassford and is her first feature-length documentary film. The documentary premiered at the Hawaii International Film Festival on October 12, 2008, and was later broadcast on PBS in May 2009. It focuses on Patsy Mink (D-HI), who was the first woman of color and Asian American woman to serve in the U.S. Congress and the co-author of the Title IX gender equity legislation.

Major funding was received from ITVS and the Center for Asian American Media.

== Synopsis ==
The film chronicles Mink's life from her beginnings on a sugar plantation on Maui, Hawai‘i, through her political career, which spanned more than four decades including twelve terms in the U.S. House of Representatives.

== Reception ==
Michael C. Reiff was mixed in his review for the film, writing "While Mink broke seemingly insurmountable barriers in her quest for self-realization, the film version of her life constrains her narrative to conventional and commonplace forms. Bassford pleasantly and cleanly educates, but doesn't achieve, or fully attempt, to cinematically translate the essence and vivid spirit of the subject." In contrast, a reviewer for the Huffington Post praised the documentary, which they found "thrilling".

=== Awards ===
- CINE, Golden Eagle (Documentary Short, Independent Division) (2008, won)
- DisOrient Asian American Film Festival, Grand Jury Prize for Best Feature (2009, nominated)
- Gate City Women's Film Festival, Blue Magnolia Award for Best in Festival, Zora Neale Hurston Award for Best Documentary Film, Bennett Spirit Award for Most Positive Portrayal of a Woman (2009, won)
- San Francisco Women's Film Festival, Best Historical Documentary, Best Editing, Best Role Model for Women (2009, won)
- San Francisco International Asian American Film Festival, Audience Award for Best Documentary Feature (2009, won)
- 2009: Honolulu International Film Festival, Best Documentary, Best Hawaiian Film, Gold Kahuna Award
- 2008: Hawaii International Film Festival, Audience Award for Favorite Documentary
