= Tanumalala =

Village on the island of Upolu in Samoa

Coordinates: 13°53′50.45″S 171°56′23.1″W

Tanumalala is a village on the island of Upolu in Samoa. The village is inland, and is part of the Lefaga ma Faleaseela Electoral Constituency (Faipule District), which forms part of the larger A'ana political district.

In 2016 the village population was estimated to be 159.
