= Kukan =

- Directed by: Rey Scott
- Written by: Rey Scott; Ralph Schoolman (adaptation); Yutang Lin (foreword)
- Produced by: Herbert T. Edwards; Rey Scott; Li Ling-Ai (technical advisor)
- Narrated by: Niles Welch
- Cinematography: Rey Scott
- Edited by: Charlie Bellante; Sam Citron
- Music by: Uncredited: Edward Craig
- Distributed by: Adventure Epics; United Artists
- Release date: June 23, 1941
- Running time: 62 minutes
- Country: United States
- Language: English

Kukan (originally subtitled The Secret of Unconquerable China) is a 1941 American documentary film co-produced by Li Ling-Ai and Rey Scott, and directed by Scott about the Chinese resistance to Japanese aggression during the early part of World War II (see Second Sino-Japanese War). Though Li served as co-producer and sponsor, she was credited as a "technical advisor" in its credits. The film was distributed in 16mm by Adventure Epics and given an Honorary Academy Award at the 14th Academy Awards.

United Artists acquired the film for broader distribution in April 1942 and renamed it KUKAN: The Battle Cry of China before releasing it in 35mm in August of the same year. Considered lost for many years, a print was located and partially restored at the Academy of Motion Picture Arts and Sciences.

In 2016, Robin Lung produced a documentary about Li, Finding Kukan. Kukan is available as an extra on Finding Kukan's home release.

== Title etymology ==
The word Kukan is composed of two Chinese characters:

- 苦 (kǔ)
- 干 (gàn)

Together, the Chinese characters Kǔgàn (苦干) translates to "hard work" or "bitter struggle". As per the original subtitle, "Unconquerable China", people willing to endure a bitter struggle.

== Production background ==
Scott, a St. Louis native and foreign correspondent for London's Daily Telegraph, took a handheld 16mm camera and color film to war-torn China, where he traveled from Hong Kong to the wartime capital Chongqing, and then along the Burma Road to Lanzhou. From there, he ventured to Tibet, then back to Chongqing. Throughout the film, Scott narrated his journey and detailed various ethnic groups that make up the Chinese population, including the Miao people from the mountains of Guizhou, the Muslim population of Lanzhou, the Buddhist population in Tibet, the nomads from the Gobi Desert and the Han and Manchu populations.

The final 20 minutes of Kukan consists of an aerial attack by Japanese bombers against the defenseless city of Chongqing from August 19–20, 1940. The bombing took up the film's final 20 minutes and showed some of the 200 tons of bombs dropped on the city. Scott captured his footage from a vantage point on the roof of the U.S. Embassy, which was near the center of the attack. Bosley Crowther, reviewing the film for The New York Times, called the sequence "one of the most awesome bits of motion picture yet seen in this day of frightful news events...somehow this wanton violence appears even more horrible than the scenes we have witnessed of London's destruction."

=== Indo-China convoy ===
After arriving in Haiphong, Scott joins a truck convoy on "(a) highway from Dongang, on the railway in French Indochina, to Kweilin, capital of Kwangsi, via Nanning, able to take five-ton loads…"

Itinerary:

- The convoy makes a dash across the border at night to evade Japanese planes.
- After crossing the border, the convoy enters rural China, Kwangsi (Guangxi) province.
- Scott observes that Nanning appears deserted during the day as people hide in the fields from air raids, but becomes active at night.
- Near Kweiyang (Guiyang), the ambulances reach the training hospital of Dr. Robert Lim, who is working to build China's medical corps.
- Scott describes Chungking (Chongqing) as a city built on cliffs at the junction of the Chialing (Jialing) and Yangtze rivers. He counts the alleged "300" steps leading up into the city.
- At Chengtu (Chengdu) located 200 miles northwest of Chungking, Scott visits West China Union University to document the "intellectual migration" of students and the development of industrial cooperatives.

== Post production ==
The film was theatrically released in 1942. Kukan received the attention of U.S. President Franklin D. Roosevelt, who saw the film at a public White House screening.

Scott received an Honorary Academy Award for Kukan. The award was presented as a certificate rather than as a statuette, and it cited Scott "for his extraordinary achievement in producing Kukan, the film record of China's struggle, including its photography with a 16mm camera under the most difficult and dangerous conditions." Kukan was one of two non-fiction features about World War II cited by the Academy for its 1941 Oscars, the other being Target for Tonight, produced by the British Ministry of Information.

Though Li Ling-Ai was a co-producer and sponsor of the film, she was credited as a "technical advisor" in its credits. It is reported that several Americans joined the Flying Tigers in China after viewing the documentary.

== See also ==
- List of rediscovered films
