= Li Ling-Ai =

American dramatist

Li Ling-Ai at the Honolulu airport June 7, 1950

Li Ling-Ai (李靈愛, also Gladys) (May 19, 1908 – October 2003) was a noted Chinese-American film producer, known for her work on the documentary Kukan.

== Early life ==
Li was born in Hawaii, the sixth of nine children. Both her parents were first-generation Chinese immigrants who became doctors in Hawaii. Her father Li Khai-Fai was a physiologist. Her mother Kong Tai Heong was an obstetrician.

She attended Punahou School and graduated from the University of Hawaii in 1930.

== Life in China and return to the United States ==
Prior to the outbreak of the Second Sino-Japanese War, Li lived in China, studying Chinese music and directing theatre productions at the Beijing Institute of Fine Arts. Forced to leave China during the war, she returned to the United States and created theatre productions for the American Bureau of Medical Aid to China Fund Raising Program. She joined the board of directors of the Sun Chung Kwock Bo newspaper. Relocating to New York, she was a member of the Nationalities Program of the National Federation of Republican Women.

== Kukan ==
She was a co-producer and sponsor of the documentary Kukan (1941), an account of how China's people endured the Second Sino-Japanese War. The documentary credits her as "technical advisor". The meaning of kukan (苦幹), according to Li, is "heroic courage under bitter suffering," a feeling that reflects the sentiment of "persevering against all odds," a sense of sticking to something in hardship to overcoming the hardship. In addition to her producing work, Ling-Ai was a confidante for Ripley's Believe It Or Not, a dancer, a relief worker, and a theater director.

The documentary Finding Kukan (2016) is about her. In this documentary Kelly Hu voices Ling-Ai as a young woman.
