= Patsy Mink =

American politician (1927–2002)

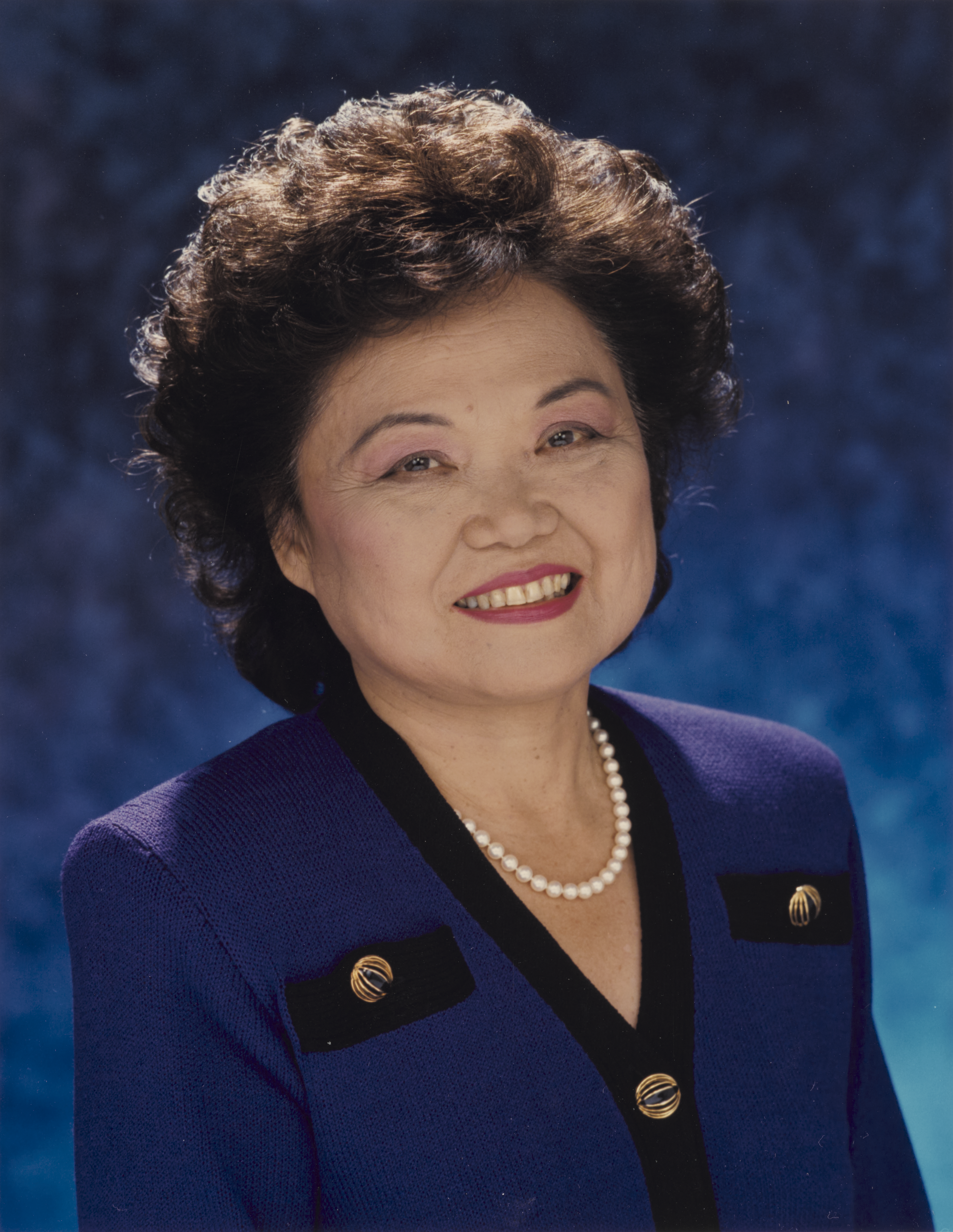
- Official portrait, c. 1994

Member of the U.S. House of Representatives from Hawaii
- In office September 22, 1990 – September 28, 2002 (Note: Mink's official service begins on the date of the special election, while she was not sworn in until September 27, 1990.)
- Preceded by: Daniel Akaka
- Succeeded by: Ed Case
- Constituency: 2nd district
- In office January 3, 1965 – January 3, 1977
- Preceded by: Thomas Gill
- Succeeded by: Daniel Akaka
- Constituency: At-large Seat B (1965–1971); 2nd district (1971–1977)

Member of the Honolulu City Council from the 9th district
- In office December 1, 1982 – December 1, 1986
- Succeeded by: John DeSoto

3rd Assistant Secretary of State for Oceans and International Environmental and Scientific Affairs
- In office March 28, 1977 – May 1, 1978
- President: Jimmy Carter
- Preceded by: Frederick Irving
- Succeeded by: Thomas R. Pickering

Secretary of the House Democratic Caucus
- In office January 3, 1975 – January 3, 1977
- Leader: Carl Albert
- Preceded by: Leonor Sullivan
- Succeeded by: Shirley Chisholm

Personal details
- Born: Patsy Matsu Takemoto; December 6, 1927 Hāmākua Poko, Hawaii Territory
- Died: September 28, 2002 (aged 74) Honolulu, Hawaii, U.S.
- Resting place: National Cemetery of the Pacific
- Party: Democratic
- Spouse: John Mink
- Children: 1
- Education: Wilson College (attended); University of Nebraska–Lincoln (attended); University of Hawaii, Manoa (BS); University of Chicago (JD)
- Mink's voice Mink honoring Mike Masaoka, a Japanese-American lobbyist. Recorded July 25, 1991

Japanese name
- Japanese: 竹本 マツ
Transcriptions
- Romanization: Takemoto Matsu

Patsy Matsu Mink (née Takemoto; December 6, 1927 – September 28, 2002) was an American attorney and politician from the U.S. state of Hawaii who served in the United States House of Representatives for 24 years as a member of the Democratic Party, initially from 1965 to 1977, and again from 1990 until her death in 2002. She was the first Woman of Color and first Asian-American woman elected to Congress, and is known for her work on legislation advancing women's rights and education.

Mink was a third-generation Japanese American, having been born and raised on the island of Maui. After graduating as valedictorian of the Maui High School class in 1944, she attended the University of Hawaiʻi at Mānoa for two years and subsequently enrolled at the University of Nebraska, where she experienced racism and worked to have segregation policies eliminated. After illness forced her to return to Hawaii to complete her studies there, she applied to 12 medical schools to continue her education but was rejected by all of them. Following a suggestion by her employer, she opted to study law and was accepted at the University of Chicago Law School in 1948. While there, she met and married a graduate student in geology, John Francis Mink. When they graduated in 1951, Patsy was unable to find employment and after the birth of their daughter in 1952, the couple moved to Hawaii.

When she was refused the right to take the bar examination, due to the loss of her Hawaiian territorial residency upon marriage, Mink challenged the statute. Though she won the right to take the test and passed the examination, she could not find public or private employment because she was married and had a child. Mink's father helped her open her own practice in 1953 and around the same time she became a member of the Democratic Party. Hoping to work legislatively to change discriminatory customs through law, she worked as an attorney for the Hawaiian territorial legislature in 1955. The following year, she ran for a seat in the territorial House of Representatives. Winning the race, she became the first Japanese-American woman to serve in the territorial House and two years later, the first woman to serve in the territorial Senate, when she won her campaign for the upper house. In 1960, Mink gained national attention when she spoke in favor of the civil rights platform at the Democratic National Convention in Los Angeles. In 1962 she was elected to the new Hawaii State Senate becoming the first Asian-American woman to be elected and serve in a state legislature in the United States.

In 1964, Mink ran for federal office and won a seat in the U.S. House of Representatives. She served a total of 12 terms (24 years), split between representing Hawaii's at-large congressional district from 1965 to 1977 and second congressional district from 1990 to 2002. While in Congress in the late 1960s, she introduced the first comprehensive initiatives under the Early Childhood Education Act, which included the first federal child-care bill and worked on the Elementary and Secondary Education Act of 1965. In 1970, she became the first person to oppose a Supreme Court nominee on the basis of discrimination against women. Mink initiated a lawsuit which led to significant changes to presidential authority under the Freedom of Information Act in 1971. In 1972, she co-authored the Title IX Amendment of the Higher Education Act, later renamed the Patsy T. Mink Equal Opportunity in Education Act in 2002.

Mink was the first East Asian-American woman to seek the presidential nomination of the Democratic Party. She ran in the 1972 election, entering the Oregon primary as an anti-war candidate. She was the federal Assistant Secretary of State for Oceans and International Environmental and Scientific Affairs from 1977 to 1979. From 1980 to 1982, Mink served as the president of Americans for Democratic Action and then returned to Honolulu, where she was elected to the Honolulu City Council, which she chaired until 1985. In 1990, she was again elected to the U.S. House, serving until her death in 2002.

== Family background ==
Patsy Matsu Takemoto was born on December 6, 1927, at the sugar plantation camp, Hāmākua Poko, near Paia, on the island of Maui. She was a sansei, or third-generation descendant of Japanese immigrants. Her mother, Mitama Tateyama, was a homemaker, and the daughter of Gojiro Tateyama and Tsuru Wakashige. Their family, which had 11 children, lived in a shack by the Waikamoi Stream. William Pogue, Gojiro's employer, arranged to have Tateyama's daughters educated at the Maunaolu Seminary, a boarding school for Christian girls located in the town of Makawao.

Takemoto's maternal grandparents were both born in the Empire of Japan during the 19th century. Gojiro Tateyama arrived in the Territory of Hawaii late in the century, and was employed on a sugarcane plantation. He later moved to Maui, where he was initially employed as a worker for the East Maui Irrigation Company. Subsequently, he was employed as a store manager and filling station employee. He also delivered mail throughout the backcountry of Maui.

Her father, Suematsu Takemoto, was a civil engineer. He graduated from the University of Hawaiʻi at Mānoa in 1922, the first Japanese American to graduate from the University of Hawaii with a degree in civil engineering. For several years, he was the only Japanese-American civil engineer working at the sugar plantation in Maui. Suematsu was passed over for promotion to chief engineer several times during his career, the positions instead being offered to mostly white Americans. He resigned his local position in 1945 in the aftermath of World War II, and moved to Honolulu with his family, where he established his own land surveying company.

== Early years and education ==
Takemoto began her education at the Hāmākua Poko Grammar School when she was four and then transferred in fourth grade to the Kaunoa English Standard School a mostly-white school attended only by students who could speak English and pass the entrance examination. She felt isolated and found the atmosphere unfriendly. She entered Maui High School one year before Honolulu was attacked by Japan. Despite the local Japanese being treated as if they were enemies, Takemoto ran for and won her first election, becoming student body president in her senior year. She was the first girl to serve as president of the student body and graduated as class valedictorian in 1944.

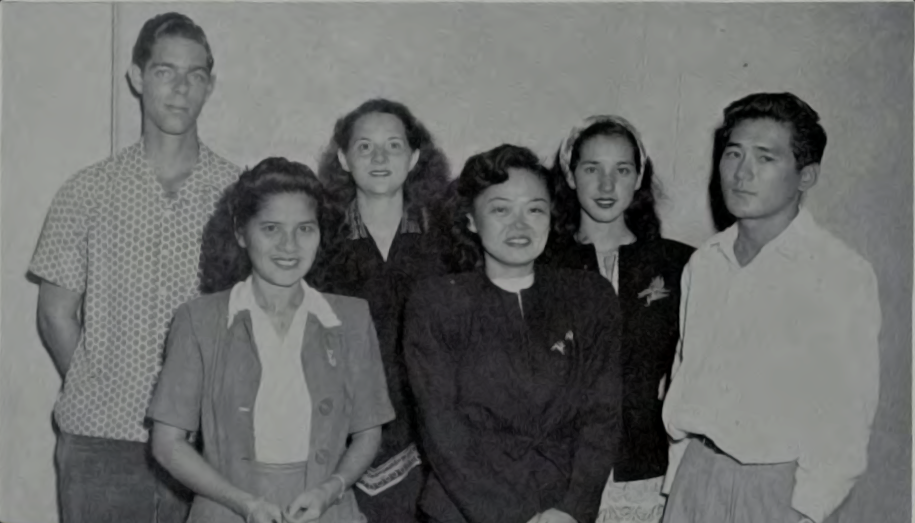
University of Hawaii Oratorical Contest Winners 1948 – L-R: front, Esther Belarmino, 3rd place; Patsy Takemoto, 1st place; Eichi Oki, finalist; back, Barry Rubin, finalist; Alice Mayo, finalist; and Jean McKillop, 2nd place

Takemoto moved to Honolulu where she attended the University of Hawaiʻi at Mānoa with medical school and a career in medicine her ultimate goal. During her sophomore year, she was elected president of the Pre-Medical Students Club and was selected as a member of the varsity debate team. In 1946, she decided to move to the mainland and spent one semester enrolled at Wilson College, a small women's college in Chambersburg, Pennsylvania. Unsatisfied with the school, Takemoto transferred to the University of Nebraska. The university had a long-standing racial segregation policy whereby students of color lived in different dormitories from the white students. This angered Takemoto, and she organized and created a coalition of students, parents, administrators, employees, alumni, sponsoring businesses and corporations. She was elected president of the Unaffiliated Students of the University of Nebraska, a "separate" student government for non-white students who were prevented from joining fraternities, sororities, and regular dormitories. Takemoto and her coalition successfully lobbied to end the university's segregation policies the same year.

Although her campaign was successful, in 1947 Takemoto experienced a serious thyroid condition that required surgery and moved back to Honolulu to recover and finish her final year of college at the University of Hawaii. In 1948, she earned bachelor's degrees in zoology and chemistry from the university. She began applying to medical schools, but none of the dozen schools to which she applied would accept her because she was a woman, especially as they were receiving large numbers of applications from returning veterans. She briefly worked as a typist at Hickam Air Force Base and then went to work at the Honolulu Academy of Arts. Her supervisor there, Jessie Purdy Restarick, encouraged her to consider a career in law.

Takemoto applied to both Columbia University and the University of Chicago Law School in the summer of 1948. Columbia rejected her outright, as the term was starting within months. The University of Chicago admitted her as a foreign student and there was only one other woman in her class. Although she had a difficult time adjusting to the harsh winters and found her courses tedious, Takemoto became a popular figure at the International House. While playing bridge there one evening, she met John Francis Mink, a former U.S. Air Force navigator and World War II veteran, who was enrolled in geology classes. Against her parents' wishes, she and Mink married in January 1951, six months after meeting. That spring, she obtained her Juris Doctor degree and John graduated as well, with a master's degree in geology.

== Early career ==
=== Law ===
Unable to find work as a married, female, Asian-American attorney, Mink returned to her student job at the University of Chicago Law School library while her husband found work immediately with the United States Steel Corporation. In 1952, she gave birth to daughter Gwendolyn (Wendy), who later became an educator and prominent author on law, poverty, and women's issues. In August the family decided to move to Hawaii where John found work with the Hawaiian Sugar Planters' Association. To practice law, Mink needed to pass her bar examination, but when she applied her residency was questioned. (Note: The Cable Act of 1922 had repealed the federal statute which required a woman to give up her citizenship in favor of her husband's, if her husband was a citizen or eligible to be naturalized. Amendments to the Cable Act continued until 1940 before married women were granted their own status as citizens without restriction. However, until the 1960s, legislative variations among the states led to extremely different civil rights for women within the federal system depending upon their residency.) The territorial law, in force at the time regarding married women, had removed her Hawaiian residency, making her a resident of her husband's state. Proving that she had never resided in her husband's home state of Pennsylvania, she challenged the territorial law as sexist. Hawaii's attorney general ruled in her favor and allowed her to take the examination as a Hawaii resident. Passing the test, Mink became "the first Japanese-American woman licensed to practice law in Hawaii".

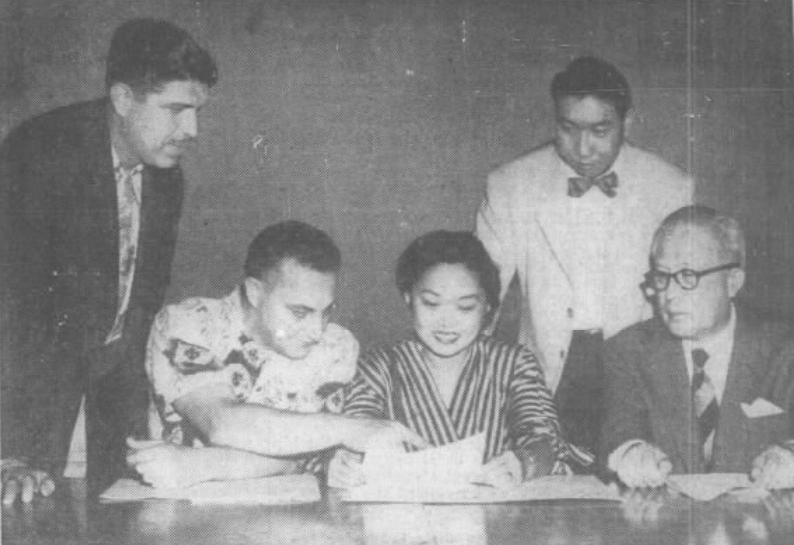
Young Democratic Club of Hawaii 1954: – L-R: seated Representative O. Vincent Esposito, Patsy Mink (chair), and Senator William H. Heen; standing, Duke Cahill (secretary) and W. C. Wong (vice-chair)

Despite passing the bar exam in June 1953, Mink continued to face discrimination as she sought employment as an attorney. No firms in the private or public sector, even those headed by Japanese Americans, were willing to hire a married woman with a child. With the help of her father, she established a private firm and began teaching law courses at the University of Hawaii to earn money while she built her practice. With the opening of her firm, Mink became the first Asian-American woman to practice law in the Hawaiian territory. Her firm took cases in criminal and family law, which other firms typically avoided. She began to be active in politics and founded the Everyman Organization, a group that served as the hub of the Young Democrats club on Oahu. She was elected "chairman of the territory-wide Young Democrats", which according to Esther K. Arinaga and Renee E. Ojiri was "a group that would wield a remarkable influence over Hawaiian politics for several decades".

=== State and territorial politics ===
In 1954, Mink worked on the congressional campaign of John A. Burns, though he lost the race. The following year, she worked as staff attorney during the 1955 legislative session and drafted statutes, while observing the inner-workings of the legislature. As the Territory of Hawaii debated statehood in 1956, Mink was elected to the Hawaiian Territorial Legislature representing the Fifth District in the territorial House of Representatives. Surprising the Democratic party leadership with her win, she became the first woman with Japanese ancestry to serve in the territorial House. Two years later, she was the first woman to serve in the territorial Senate. In 1959, Hawaii became the 50th state of the Union and Mink ran in the Democratic primary for the state's at-large U.S. congressional seat. She was defeated by Territorial Senator Daniel Inouye. From 1962 to 1964, Mink served in the Hawaii State Senate.

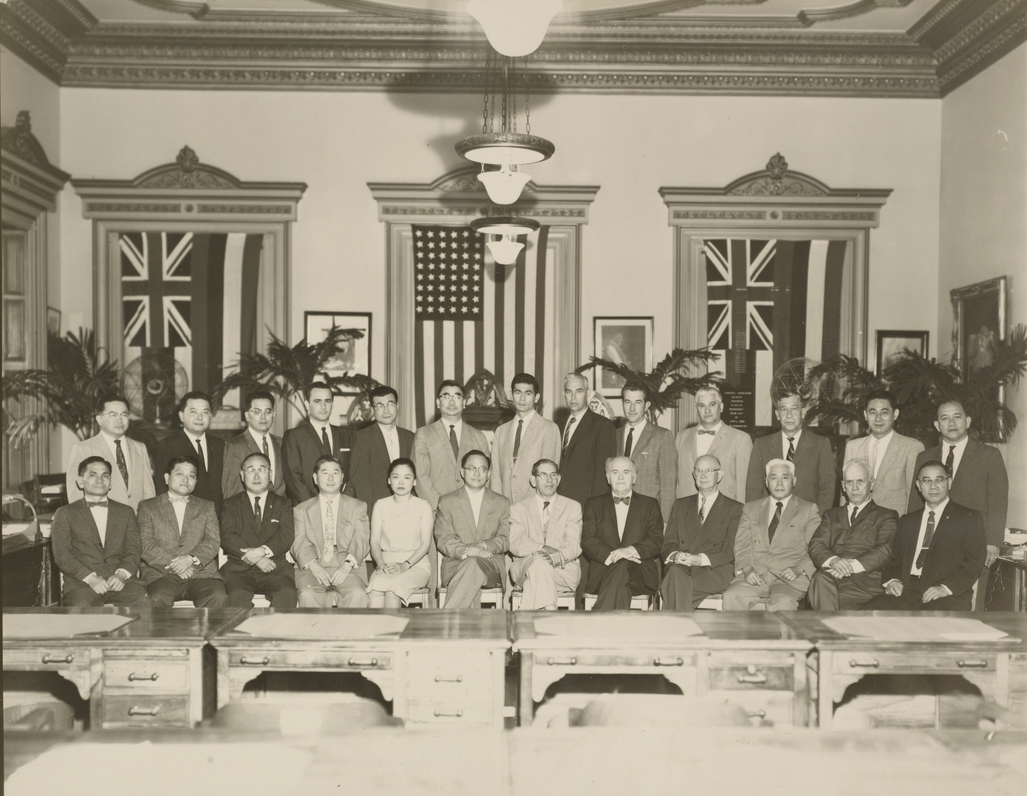
Mink, the sole woman in the 1958 Hawaii Territorial Senate

During her time in the territorial legislature, Mink was known for her liberal positions and independent decision-making. On her first day in office as a congresswoman in 1955, she submitted a successful resolution protesting British nuclear testing in the Pacific. Dealing with a broad spectrum of socio-economic issues, she worked on legislation covering education, employment, housing, poverty, and taxation. She authored a bill in 1957 to grant "equal pay for equal work", regardless of gender, and was a staunch supporter of improving education, supporting legislation to increase per capita spending to better provide for children. In 1960, Mink became vice-president of the National Young Democratic Clubs of America and worked on the Democratic National Convention's Platform Committee drafting team. That year at the national convention in Los Angeles, she gained recognition when she spoke on the party's position in regard to civil rights. She urged that equal opportunity and equal protection be afforded to all Americans. Motions to restrict the civil rights platform made by North Carolina Senator Sam Ervin were defeated and a platform to ensure equal rights and equal protection under the law to all citizens passed with the approval of two-thirds of the party.

== Federal politics ==
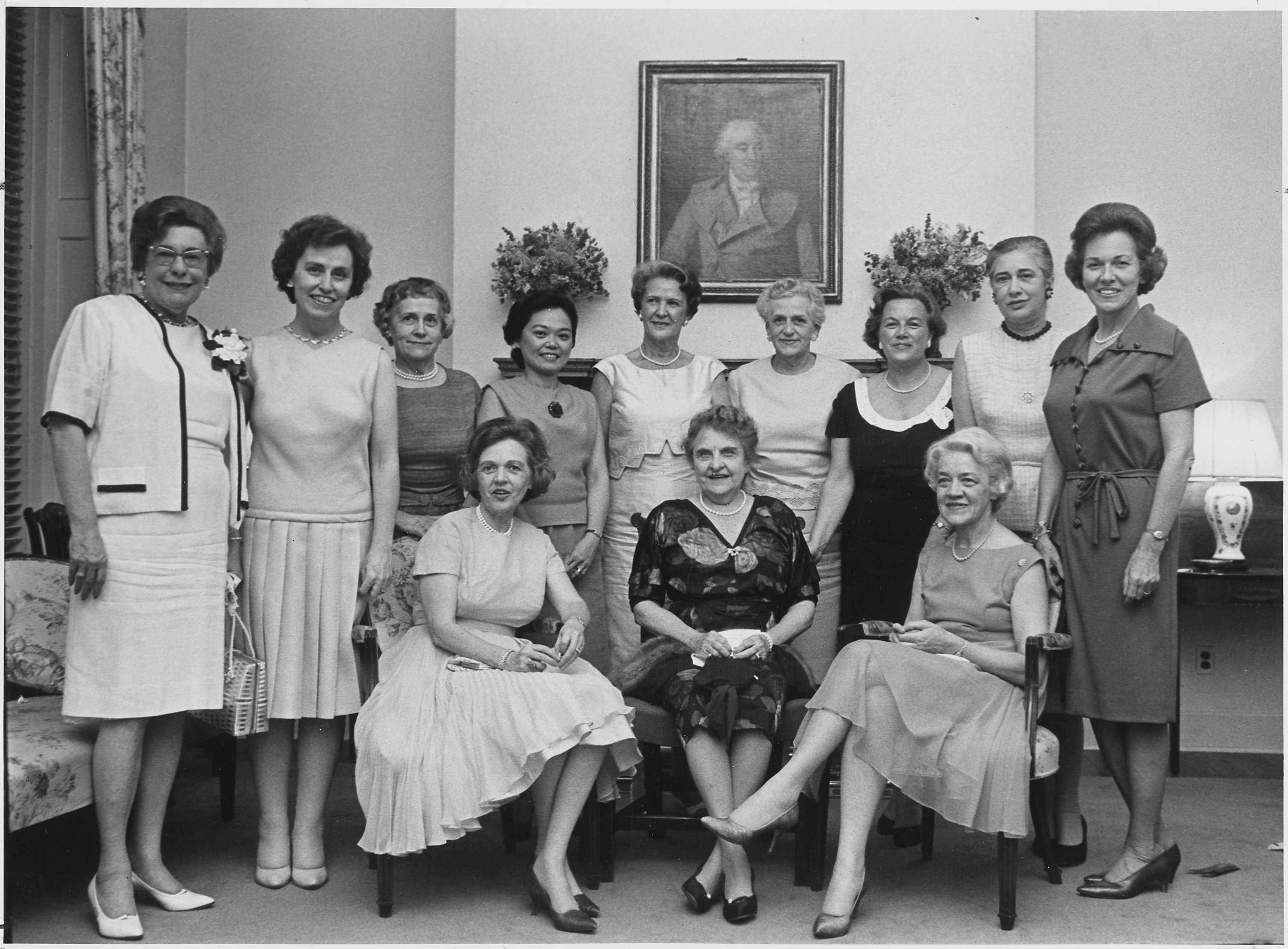
1965 Congresswomen — L-R: Seated, Senator Maurine Neuberger, Oregon; Representative Frances Bolton, Ohio; Senator Margaret Chase Smith, Maine; Standing, Representatives, Florence Dwyer, New Jersey; Martha Griffiths, Michigan; Edith Green, Oregon; Patsy Mink, Hawaii; Leonor Sullivan, Missouri; Julia Hansen, Washington; Catherine May, Washington; Edna Kelly, New York; and Charlotte Reid, Illinois.

=== U.S. Representative (1965–1977) ===
Deciding to vie for a federal seat, Mink campaigned and won a post in the U.S. House. As a result, she became the first woman from Hawaii elected to Congress, the first woman of color elected to the House, the "youngest member from the youngest state, as well as the first Japanese-American woman member in Congress". Serving six consecutive terms, she was in office from 1965 to 1977. Her independent nature continued to guide her decisions and she focused on issues that had been important to her in the Hawaiian legislature, such as children, education, and gender equality. Mink supported the Great Society programs of President Lyndon B. Johnson, though she was openly critical of the Vietnam War.

Seeking and attaining a post on the Committee on Education and Labor, on which she would serve throughout her first tenure (1965–1977), Mink introduced in the late 1960s the first comprehensive initiatives under the Early Childhood Education Act, which included the first federal child-care bill and bills establishing bilingual education, Head Start, school lunch programs, special education, student loans, and teacher sabbaticals. She also worked on the Elementary and Secondary Education Act of 1965 and bills promoting adult education, Asian studies, career guidance programs, and vocational education. Her day-care bill proposed in 1967, was the first bill of its kind to pass both houses of Congress. Passed in 1971, the bill was vetoed by President Richard Nixon. In her second term, during the 90th Congress, Mink was appointed to the Committee on Interior and Insular Affairs.

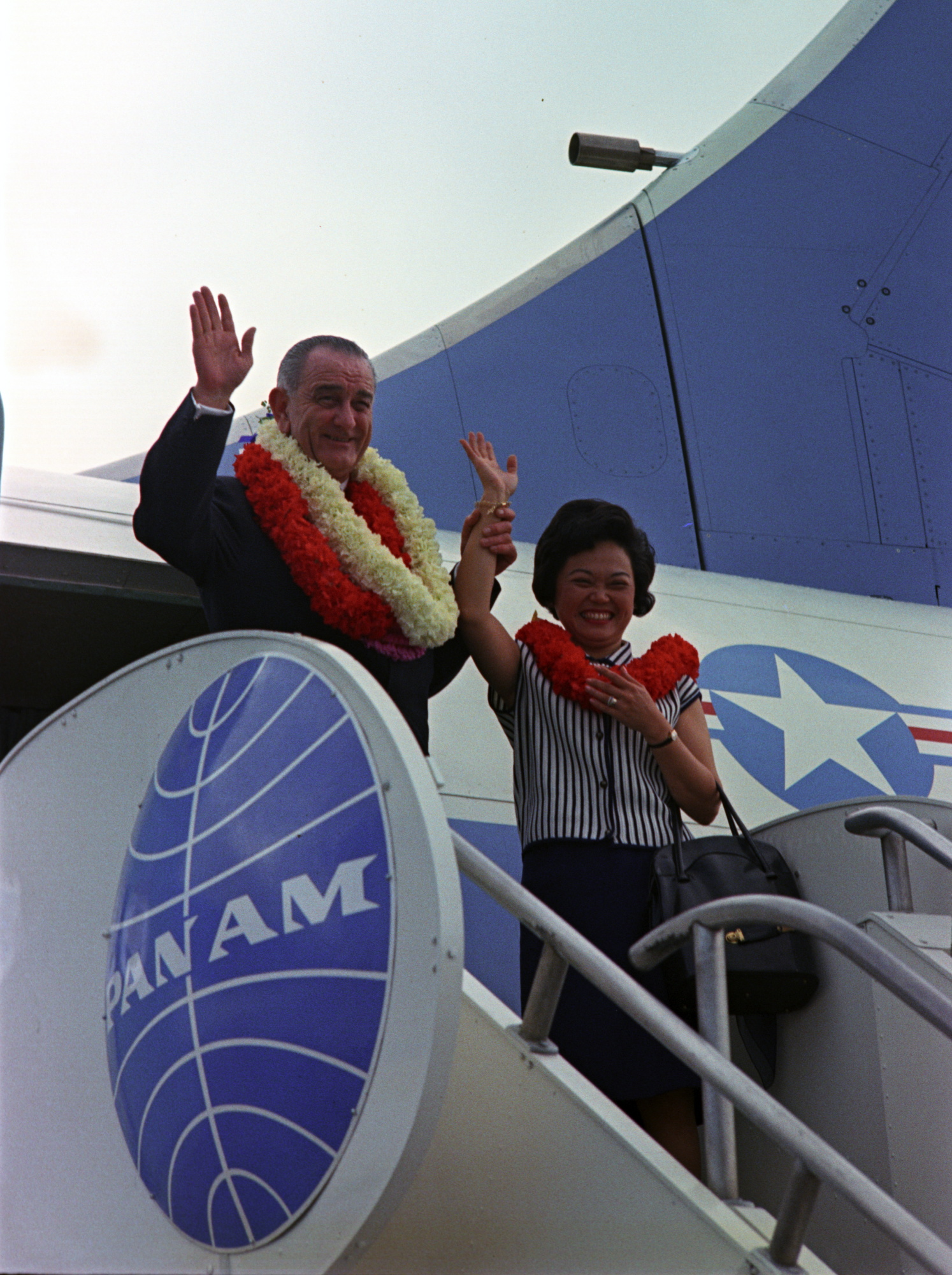
Mink with Lyndon Johnson after his trip to Hawaii for a conference on the Vietnam War, February 1966

In 1970, Mink became the first Democratic woman to deliver a State of the Union response and only the second woman to respond to the address. That year, she was the first witness to testify against President Nixon's Supreme Court nominee George Harrold Carswell. In her testimony, she cited his refusal to hear the case brought to the 5th Circuit Court of Appeals regarding Ida Phillips' employment discrimination case. Phillips had been denied a position because she was a woman with children and Mink's objection highlighted, for the first time in an evaluation of a court nominee, the inequalities faced by working women. Carswell would eventually be rejected by the Senate. Harry Blackmun, who wrote the majority opinion in Roe v. Wade, would later be confirmed instead.

Mink sued the Environmental Protection Agency in 1971, to obtain copies of documents that were being withheld by Nixon's office with regard to nuclear testing on Amchitka Island. Believing that under the Freedom of Information Act agency reports connected to the test should be released, she led 32 congress members in the attempt to secure the reports. The District Court ruled that the documents "were exempt from compelled disclosure" and the test was performed in November 1971. The Court of Appeals reversed the decision of the lower court ruling that an in camera inspection of sensitive documents might determine that some could be released. Escalated to the Supreme Court, the decision issued reversed the appeals decision and confirmed that court inspection could not override the executive's exemption. The Court did allow that Congress could change the law with regard to the regulation of executive actions. In 1974, Congress authorized private scrutiny of documents withheld by the executive. President Gerald Ford vetoed the legislation, but his veto was overridden by Congress.

Frustrated by the roll-backs by the Nixon administration of civil liberties and the continuance of the Vietnam War, Mink entered the presidential race in 1971 hoping to become the Democratic Party's nominee. She was the first Asian-American woman to run for president. As Hawaii had no primary, her name appeared on the Oregon ballot for 1972, as an anti-war candidate. During her campaign, she flew to Paris with Bella Abzug, U.S. Representative of New York, to press for the resumption of peace talks. Arriving in April, the women met with Nguyễn Thị Bình, foreign minister for North Vietnam, as well as representatives for the South Vietnamese and United States governments. Her actions drew strong criticism, fostering a campaign by Democrats in her home state to oppose her next term in Congress. In May, she lost the presidential primary, failing to secure enough delegates to support her candidacy, earning only 2% of the 50 potential delegates.

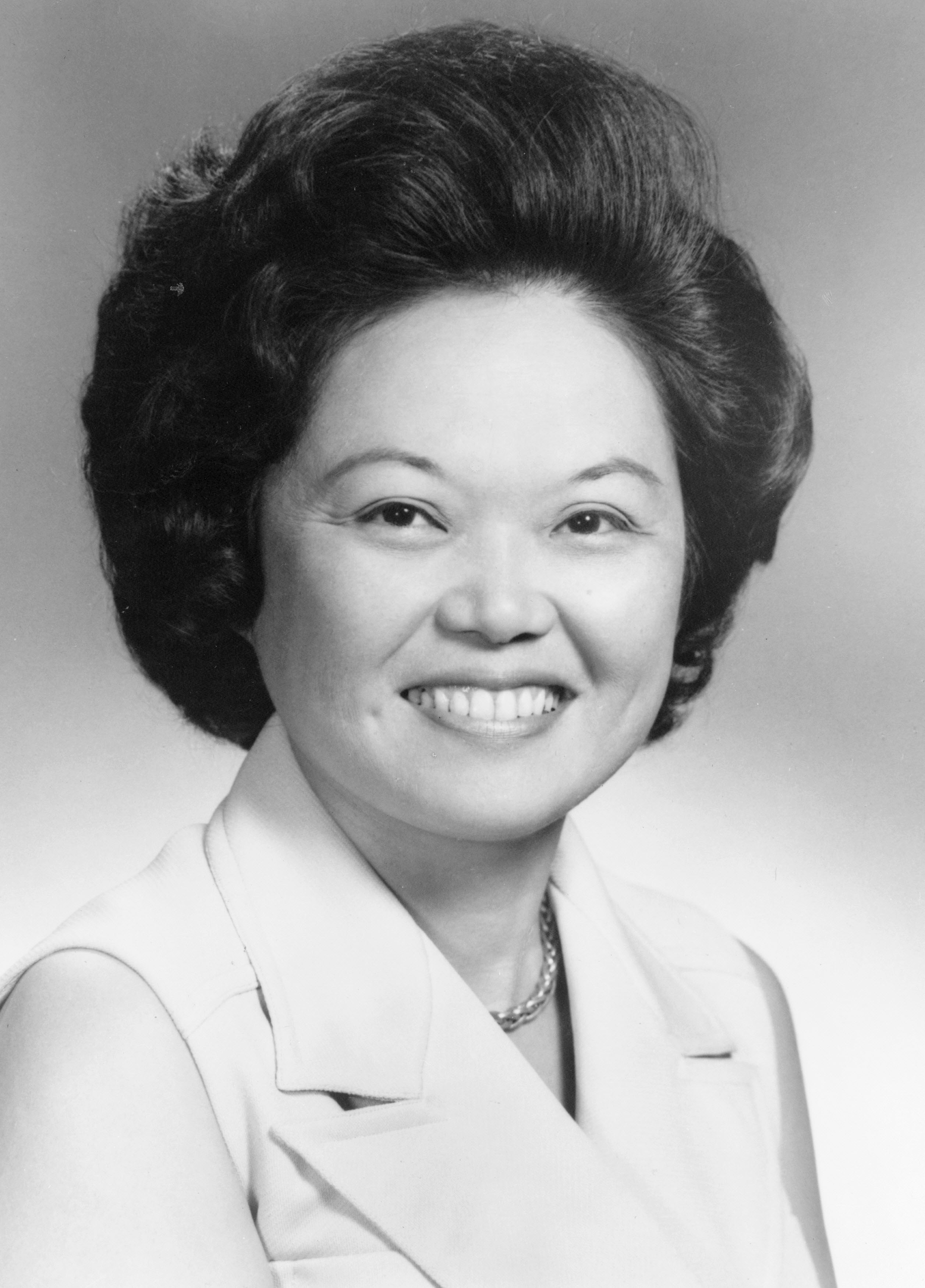
1972 campaign poster image from the Patsy Mink for President Committee

Mink co-authored and advocated for the passage of Title IX Amendment of the Higher Education Act, prohibiting gender discrimination by federally funded institutions of higher education, helped by Bernice Sandler, Edith Green and Birch Bayh. President Nixon signed the Act into law in 1972. She also introduced the Women's Educational Equity Act of 1974, which allocated funds for the promotion of gender equity in schools. The law opened employment and education opportunities for women and opposed gender stereotypes in curricula and textbooks. In addition to her work on education issues, Mink promoted numerous laws that dealt with other issues important to women. These included the Consumer Product Safety and Equal Employment Opportunity Acts of 1972; the Equal Credit Opportunity Act of 1974; and various bills dealing with discrimination in insurance practices, pensions, retirement benefits, social security, survivor's benefits and taxation; equitable jury service; health care issues; housing discrimination based on marital status; and privacy issues. In 1973, she authored and introduced the Equal Rights for Women Act (H.R. 4034), which never made it out of committee, and she supported the ratification of the Equal Rights Amendment.

In 1975, Mink attended the World Conference on Women held in Mexico City from mid-June to early July. Together with Abzug and Representative Margaret Heckler of Massachusetts, she pledged to sponsor and support legislation for a U.S. women's conference for the United States Bicentennial. When they returned home, Abzug introduced HR 9924, co-sponsored by Mink and others, which granted $5 million in total taxpayer contributions ($29.9 million in 2025 dollars) for both state and National Women's Conferences. It was signed into law by President Ford. Later that year, an effort was made to exempt school athletics from the provisions of Title IX via the Casey Amendment. The Amendment proposed allowing schools to determine whether they would provide equal funding for men's and women's sporting activities. The exemption was struck from the Senate version of the appropriations bill. In the House, though Mink had lobbied heavily against the amendment to the appropriations bill (H.R. 5901), immediately before the vote was called she left the chamber, having received an emergency message that her daughter had been in a serious car accident in New York. In a 211 against and 212 for vote, the appropriation bill passed with the Casey Amendment intact. Upon her return from New York, Speaker Carl Albert of Oklahoma and other members of the House called for a revote due to the circumstances. July 17 members revoted and with 215 in favor to 178 against, the Casey Amendment was rejected; so protecting the anti-discrimination provisions of Title IX.

Throughout her tenure, Mink was involved in many congressional activities, including serving as vice-chair of the Democratic Study Group from 1966 through 1971. In 1968, she served as chair of the House-Senate Ad Hoc Committee on Poverty. From 1972 to 1976, she served on the House Budget Committee, chaired the Insular Affairs Subcommittee on mines and mining from 1973 to 1977 and from 1975 to 1976 was part of the Select Committee on the Outer Continental Shelf. In 1976, learning that she had been given the experimental drug diethylstilbestrol, during her pregnancy, which unwittingly placed both her and her daughter at risk of developing cancer, Mink brought a class action lawsuit against Eli Lilly and Company and the University of Chicago. The settlement entitled all 1,000 women affected, and their children, to free lifetime diagnostic testing and treatment at the Chicago Lying-In Clinic. That year, she also filed a complaint with the Federal Communications Commission which successfully required radio stations to provide equal air time to opposing views. Mink introduced the Surface Mining Control and Reclamation Act, which was enacted in 1977. From 1975 to 1977, during the 94th Congress, she was elected to a position in the House Democratic leadership, as Secretary of the House Democratic Caucus.

=== U.S. Assistant Secretary of State (1977–1978) ===
In 1976, Mink gave up her seat in Congress to run for a vacancy in the United States Senate created by the retirement of Senator Hiram Fong. After she lost the primary election for the Senate seat to Hawaii's other U.S. Representative, Spark Matsunaga, President Jimmy Carter appointed Mink as Assistant Secretary of State for Oceans and International Environmental and Scientific Affairs. She worked on environmental issues such as deep sea mining, toxic waste, and whale protection, holding the post from March 1977 to May 1978.

== Return to the private sector (1980–1987) ==
Mink resigned from the Carter Administration in 1980, accepting a position as president of the Americans for Democratic Action in Washington, D. C. She was the first woman to head the national organization and served three consecutive one-year terms. Returning to Honolulu, she was elected to the Honolulu City Council in 1983, serving as chair until 1985. She was regularly on opposite sides to the Republican Mayor of Honolulu Frank Fasi, who was elected in 1984, though she remained on the council until 1987. In 1986 she ran for governor of Hawaii and in 1988 for mayor of Honolulu, but was not successful in either bid for office. When she left the city council, Mink began working for The Public Reporter, a watchdog committee that monitored and published reports on voting records and pending legislation. She also led the Hawaii Coalition on Global Affairs, a group which sponsored public lectures and workshops on international issues.

== Return to Congress (1990–2002) ==
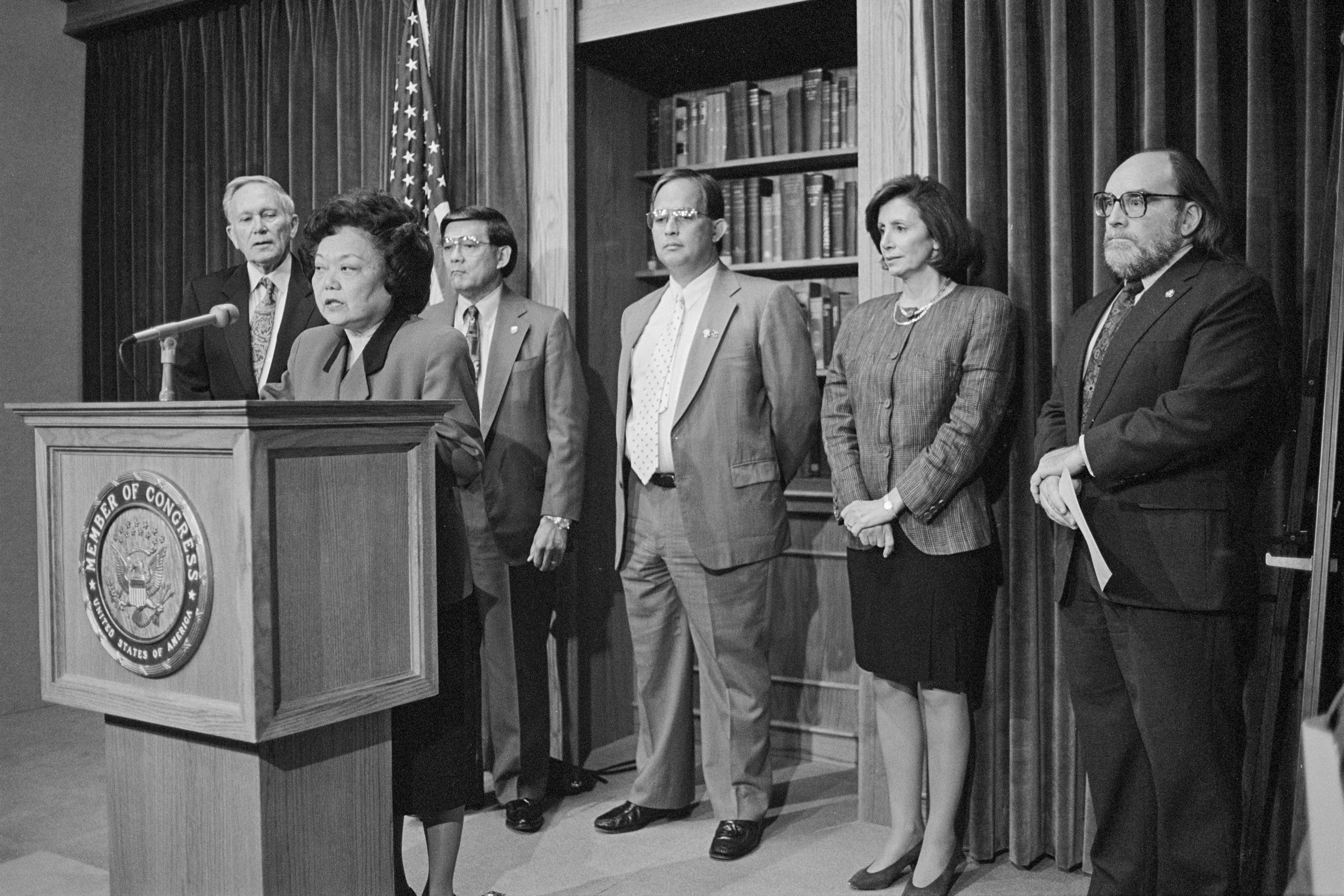
Mink announcing the formation of the Congressional Asian Pacific American Caucus

In 1990, Mink was elected to complete the remaining term of her successor in the House, Daniel Akaka. Akaka had been appointed to the Senate to succeed Matsunaga, who had recently died in office. She was elected to a full term six weeks later, and subsequently was reelected six times. That year, she opposed the Supreme Court nominee Clarence Thomas. When the Senate Judiciary Committee denied Anita Hill the opportunity to give testimony, Mink, and other congresswomen, including Barbara Boxer of California, Louise Slaughter of New York, and Pat Schroeder of Colorado, marched to the Capitol to protest the decision. Their protest was carried on the front page of The New York Times and Hill was later allowed to testify.

In her second tenure as a House member, Mink worked to revive protections in the socio-economic programs she had worked for in her first six terms, which had been scaled back by subsequent administrations. From 1990 to 1993, she worked on legislation sponsoring the Ovarian Cancer Research Act and amendments to the Higher Education Act. In 1992, she was honored by the American Bar Association with the Margaret Brent Women Lawyers Achievement Award for professional excellence. She co-sponsored the Gender Equity Act of 1993, pressed for universal health care, and introduced a bill to protect reproductive decisions as an individual right. She worked on legislation regarding displaced homemakers, minimum wage increases, occupational safety, pay inequality, and violence against women.

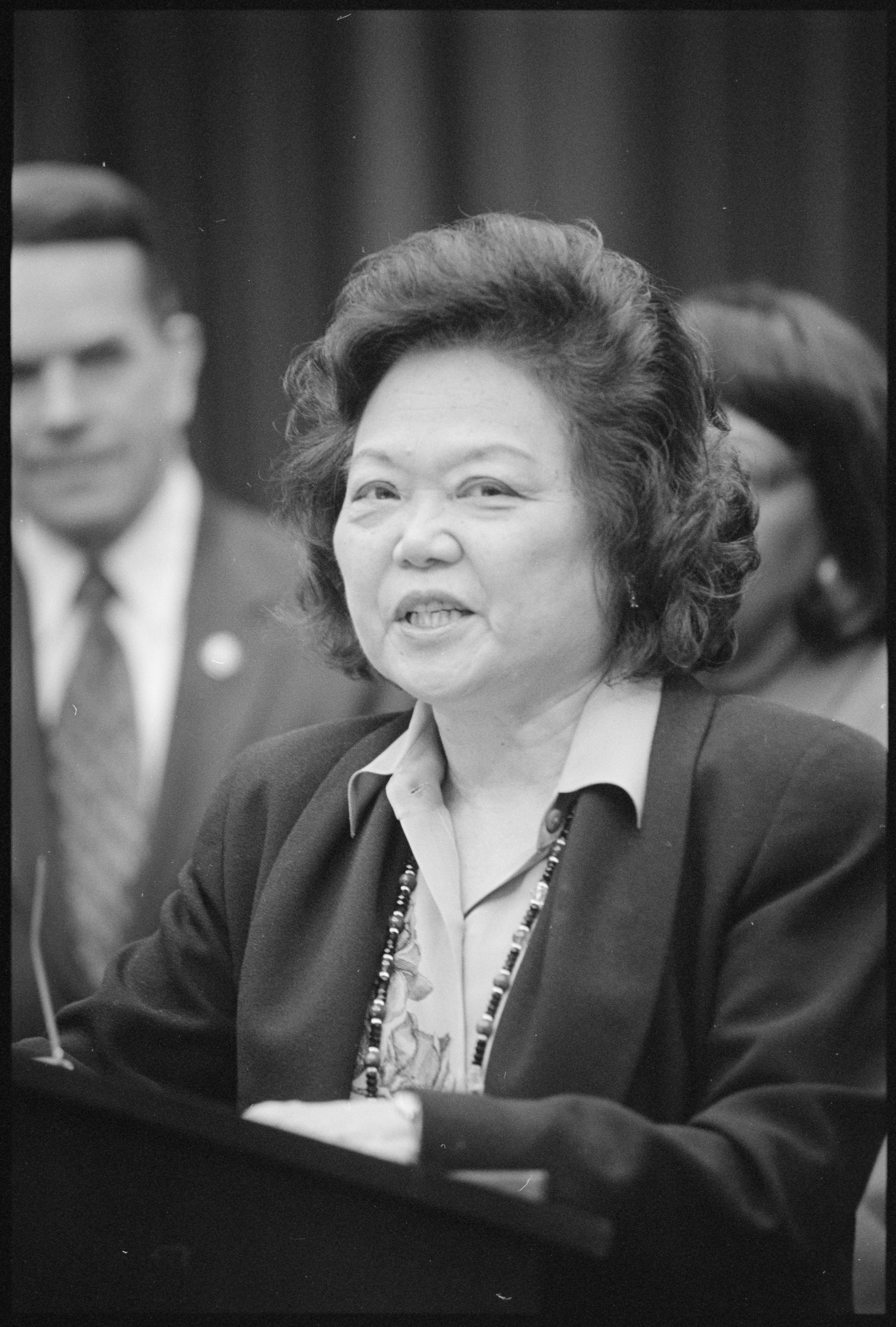
Mink speaking in Washington in 1993

In May 1994, Mink and Representative Norman Mineta of California co-founded the Congressional Asian Pacific American Caucus for which she became chair in 1995, serving until 1997. She also served as co-chair of the House Democratic Women's Caucus. In 1996, Mink opposed the welfare-reform legislation proposed by the Republican-majority House and supported by the Clinton administration. She authored the Family Stability and Work Act as an alternative welfare reform measure and repeatedly, though mostly unsuccessfully, lobbied for increased federal safety nets for children and families living in impoverished conditions. She opposed legislation that would limit liability for product injuries and work place discrimination and objected to the ratification of the North American Free Trade Agreement. She was a co-sponsor of the DREAM Act and staunchly opposed the creation of the United States Department of Homeland Security, fearing that it might curtail civil liberties and result in another occurrence of policies like the internment of Japanese Americans during World War II.

Mink and other members of the House of Representatives objected to counting the 25 electoral votes from Florida which George W. Bush narrowly won after a contentious recount. Because no senator joined her objection, the objection was dismissed by Vice President Al Gore, who was Bush's opponent in the 2000 presidential election. Without Florida's electoral votes, the election would have been decided by the U.S. House of Representatives, with each state having one vote in accordance with the Twelfth Amendment to the United States Constitution.

== Death ==
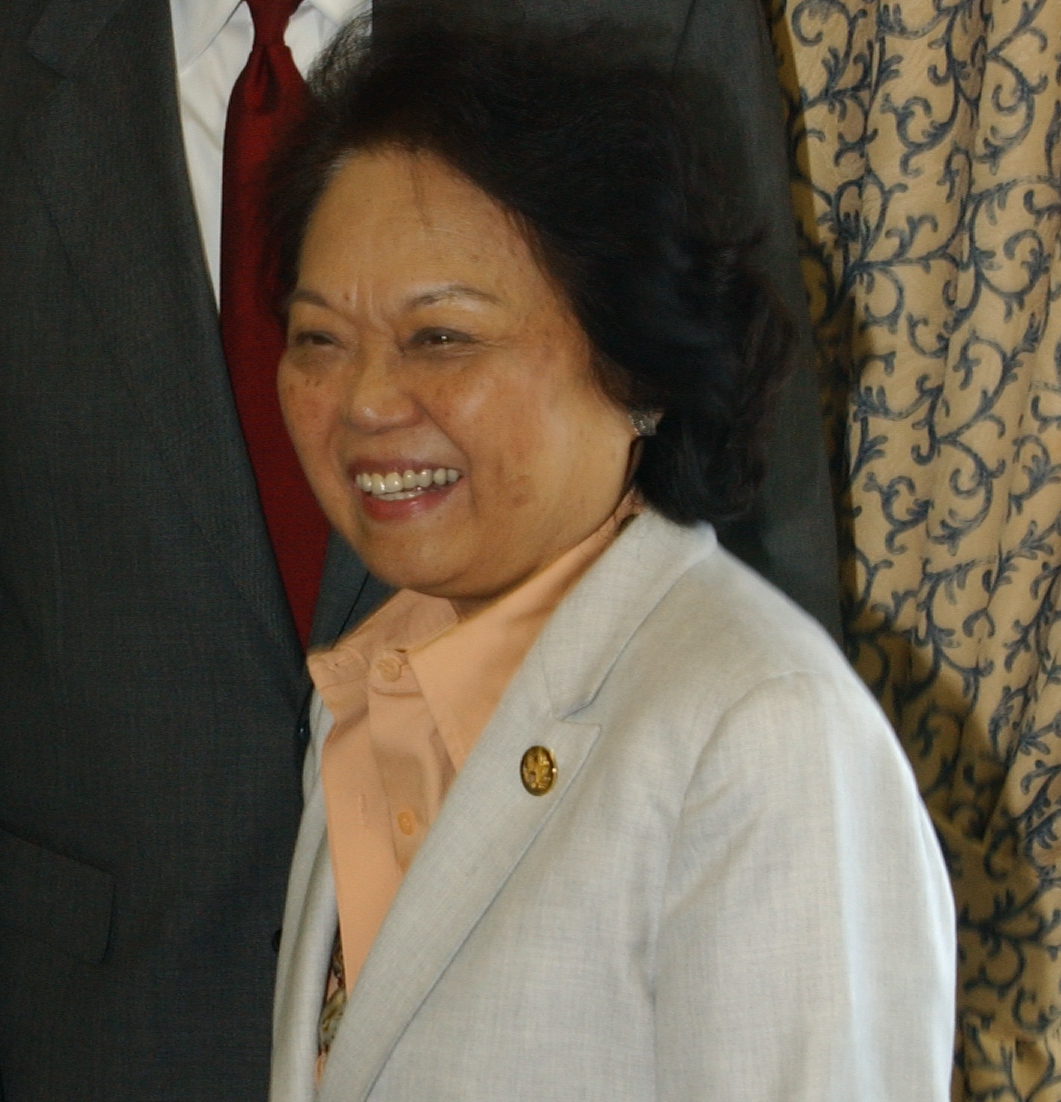
Mink, 2002

On August 30, 2002, Mink was hospitalized in Honolulu's Straub Clinic and Hospital due to complications from chickenpox. Her condition steadily worsened, and on September 28, 2002, she died in Honolulu of viral pneumonia, at age 74. In recognition of the national mourning of her death, Secretary of Defense Donald Rumsfeld ordered all flags at military institutions lowered to half staff in her honor. Mink received a national memorial and was honored with a state funeral held on October 4 in the Hawaii State Capitol Rotunda attended by leaders and members of Congress. Women's groups honored Mink by forming a human lei of approximately 900 women who surrounded the tent where Mink's casket stood in the capital atrium, while singing Hawaiian songs. She is buried at the National Memorial Cemetery of the Pacific, near the Punchbowl Crater. Mink's death occurred one week after she had won the 2002 primary election, too late for her name to be removed from the general election ballot. On November 5, 2002, Mink was posthumously re-elected to Congress. Her vacant seat was filled by Ed Case after a special election on January 4, 2003.

== Legacy ==
Mink is remembered as a woman who dealt with the personal discrimination she had experienced as a woman and an Asian American by devoting her career to creating public policies to open doors for women and minorities. In 2002 Congress renamed the Title IX Amendment of the Higher Education Act, which Mink had co-authored, as the "Patsy T. Mink Equal Opportunity in Education Act". Her papers were donated in 2002 and are housed in the Library of Congress. In 2003 a scholarship program, the Patsy Takemoto Mink Education Foundation, was established to provide educational funding for low-income women and children. That year, Mink was inducted into the National Women's Hall of Fame, and the Scholar-Athlete Hall of Fame of the Institute for International Sport, and the post office serving the area of Maui in which she grew up was renamed the Patsy Takemoto Mink Post Office Building in her honor, after authorization by President George W. Bush. In 2007, Central Oahu Regional Park on Oahu was renamed "Patsy T. Mink Central Oahu Regional Park" in her honor. She was honored posthumously with the Presidential Medal of Freedom from President Barack Obama on November 24, 2014. In 2019, Time created 89 new covers to celebrate women of the year starting from 1920; it chose Mink for 1972. In June 2022, a portrait of her by Sharon Sprung was unveiled in the U.S. Capitol, where it now hangs.

Documentary films about Mink's life and role in Title IX include the Patsy Mink: Ahead of the Majority (2008), directed by Kimberlee Bassford and Rise of the Wahine (2014), directed by Dean Kaneshiro. The 2008 film highlighted the challenges Mink overcame and how that fueled her work on legislation to help others. The 2014 film told the story of the University of Hawaii's women's volleyball team's struggle to build a team even after Title IX passed. As the bill was an educational funding law, women's athletic director, Donnis Thompson used it as leverage to expand sporting opportunities at the university in spite of intense opposition. Working together to ensure that lawmakers understood who they were representing, Mink had Thompson bring the team to Washington. Author Judy Tzu-Chen Wu and Mink's daughter, Gwendolyn Mink, co-wrote a biography that released in May 2022 called Fierce and Fearless: Patsy Takemoto Mink, First Woman of Color in Congress. It is the first biography detailing Mink's life and in 2023, won the Mary Nickliss Prize in U.S. Women's and/or Gender History.

In 2024, the United States Mint honored Mink with the 2024 Patsy Takemoto Mink Quarter, which was the 12th coin released in the American Women Quarter program.

== Selected works ==
- Mink, Patsy (September 1966). "Education—The Vision of America". The School Counselor. 14 (1). American School Counselor Association: 5–12. ISSN 0036-6536. OCLC 5792465172.
- Mink, Patsy (December 1970). "The Status of Women". Educational Horizons. 49 (2). Pi Lambda Theta: 54–56. ISSN 0013-175X. OCLC 5792526438.
- Mink, Patsy (1971). "Micronesia: Our Bungled Trust". Texas International Law Forum (6). University of Texas at Austin: 181–207. ISSN 0040-4381. OCLC 16332426.
- Mink, Patsy (1976). "Energy and Environment: Which Is Undermining Which?". Natural Resources Lawyer (9). American Bar Association: 19–39. ISSN 2328-3416. OCLC 772508196.
- Mink, Patsy (1976). "Reclamation and Rollcalls: The Political Struggle over Stripmining". Environmental Policy and Law. 2 (4). Elsevier Science Publishers: 176–180. Bibcode:1976EnvPL...2..176M. doi:10.1016/S0378-777X(76)80011-X. ISSN 0378-777X. OCLC 4933180255.
- Mink, Patsy; Hartmann, Heidi I. (Spring 1994). "Wrap-up". Social Justice. 21 (1). Social Justice/Global: 110–113. JSTOR 29766793.
- Mink, Patsy (October 1996). "Nuclear Waste: The Most Compelling Environmental Issue Facing the World Today". Fordham Environmental Law Journal. 8 (1). Fordham University School of Law: 165–170. ISSN 1079-6657. OCLC 7851122029.

== See also ==
- List of Asian Americans and Pacific Islands Americans in the United States Congress
- List of members of the United States Congress who died in office (2000–present)#2000s
- Patsy T. Mink Central Oahu Regional Park
- Women in the United States House of Representatives

== Explanatory notes ==
U.S. House of Representatives
Preceded by Thomas Gill	Member of the U.S. House of Representatives from Hawaii's at-large congressional district 1965–1971	Constituency abolished
New constituency	Member of the U.S. House of Representatives from Hawaii's 2nd congressional district 1971–1977	Succeeded by Daniel Akaka
Preceded by Daniel Akaka	Member of the U.S. House of Representatives from Hawaii's 2nd congressional district 1990–2002	Succeeded by Ed Case
Preceded by Norman Mineta	Chair of the Congressional Asian Pacific American Caucus; 1995–1997	Succeeded by Robert Underwood
Party political offices
Vacant Title last held by Howard Baker, George H. W. Bush, Peter Dominick, Gerald Ford, Robert Griffin, Thomas Kuchel, Mel Laird, Bob Mathias, George Murphy, Dick Poff, Chuck Percy, Al Quie, Charlotte Reid, Hugh Scott, Bill Steiger, John Tower; 1968	Response to the State of the Union address 1970; Served alongside: Donald Fraser, Scoop Jackson, Mike Mansfield, John McCormack, Ed Muskie, Bill Proxmire	Succeeded by Mike Mansfield
Preceded by Leonor Sullivan	Secretary of the House Democratic Caucus; 1975–1977	Succeeded by Shirley Chisholm
Political offices
Preceded by Frederick Irving	Assistant Secretary of State for Oceans and International Environmental and Scientific Affairs; 1977–1978	Succeeded by Tom Pickering
