= Searching (film series) =

Film series

- Official film series logo
- Based on: An original story by Aneesh Chaganty & Sev Ohanian
- Starring: John Cho; Michelle La; Sarah Paulson; Kiera Allen; Storm Reid; Nia Long; Various others; (See full list below)
- Distributed by: Sony Pictures Releasing; Hulu
- Release dates: August 24, 2018 (Searching); November 20, 2020 (Run); January 20, 2023 (Missing)
- Country: United States
- Language: English
- Budget: $8,880,000 (3 films)
- Box office: $90,616,177 (3 films)

The Searching film series consists of American mystery-thriller screenlife films, including two theatrical movies, and one theatrical-streaming exclusive film. The plot of each movie centers around parent-child relationships, and depict the use of public records through technology in investigations of true crime.

The films have been well received by critics and audiences alike. The original film starring John Cho was met with critical and financial success, with praise for its integration of found footage sub-genre "screen life", and its realism. The 2020 standalone installment starring Sarah Paulson was likewise met with a positive critical reaction, while acknowledging its campy elements praise was directed at the cast and the film's premise. The standalone sequel which starred Storm Reid, was mostly well received by critics with some calling it superior to the previous installments, while others criticized elements of its plot as unbelievable. The film series as a whole has also been deemed a financial success at the box office, turning a profit for the associated studios.

== Films ==
Film	U.S. release date	Director(s)	Screenwriter(s)	Story by	Producer(s)
Searching	August 24, 2018	Aneesh Chaganty	Aneesh Chaganty & Sev Ohanian	Aneesh Chaganty & Sev Ohanian	Natalie Qasabian, Timur Bekmambetov, Sev Ohanian and Adam Sidman
Run.	November 20, 2020	Aneesh Chaganty	Aneesh Chaganty & Sev Ohanian	Aneesh Chaganty & Sev Ohanian	Natalie Qasabian and Sev Ohanian
Missing	January 20, 2023	Nick Johnson & Will Merrick	Nick Johnson & Will Merrick	Aneesh Chaganty & Sev Ohanian	Natalie Qasabian, Timur Bekmambetov, Sev Ohanian, Aneesh Chaganty and Adam Sidman

=== Searching (2018) ===
When high school student Margot Kim goes missing, her father David becomes desperate when the initial police investigation is unsuccessful. Frantically searching her personal laptop for any clues to where she has gone, David sorts through videos and photos, contacts all of her peers, and tries to retrace her digital footprint to assist in locating his daughter. As he starts to solve the mystery, he begins to question everything he thought he knew.

=== Run. (2020) ===
Chloe Sherman, a homeschooled student raised in isolation, lives with her protective and doting mother named Diane. Chloe uses a wheelchair, and her mother has attended to her every need from the time she was born with lower-body paralysis and other medical conditions. Now a teenager, she one day discovers some documents which make her begin to question her upbringing and the reality she's been taught to believe. When she discontinues taking the medication that her mother gives her, she plots an escape from the house. When she leaves, she races against time before Diane realizes she is missing, and to find the truth to questions that can't be answered from the confines of her home.

=== Missing (2023) ===
June Allen is a well behaved teenager, who gives support to her widowed mother named Grace. When Grace goes on a trip to Colombia with her new boyfriend, but never comes home, June contacts the police. Due to international red tape, she searches for her mom using the technology that she has access to. Becoming creative in the process of her digital sleuthing, she starts to question the means of Grace's whereabouts. With the information she acquires, she races against time to solve the mystery before it's too late and her mother is lost in a foreign country forever.

=== Future ===
In January 2023 co-screenwriters/co-directors of Missing, Will Merrick and Nick Johnson, confirmed that the studio has already approached them with development of another movie. The duo stated that while all creatives involved have ideas for the next film, they intend to wait some time before writing the story.

== Connections ==
The filmmakers of each installment have stated that there are various ways that the movies connect to each other, both directly with continuing plot threads and through a hidden sub-plot within the films.

=== Continuing story ===
During the events of Searching, references are made to characters from Run.; something that the filmmakers included to foreshadow the plot of the latter film. In Run., references are made to David and Margot Kim from Searching in the form of in-universe news coverage to the characters, as well as the appearance of Hannah who is a model in the overarching story. In Missing, it's shown that the experiences of David and Margot have been detailed in the form of a true crime series, which June is invested in. It is also revealed that following previous events, Diane Sherman has escaped the psych-ward she was admitted to.

=== Sub-plot ===
In 2018 following the release of Searching, Chaganty and Ohanian confirmed an additional story that was presented in the background of the primary plot of the film. Stating that it started off as an inside joke, the filmmaking duo decided to explore an alien invasion sub-plot. The story continued in as a secondary plot of the standalone sequel Missing, where they revealed that following the aftermath of the invasion, someone with abilities that they inherited as a result of the attack from the extraterrestrials, defended communities from the ill intentions of the otherworldly creatures.

== Main cast and characters ==
List indicators

This section includes characters who will appear or have appeared in the franchise in main roles.

- An empty grey cell indicates the character was not in the film, or that the character's official presence has not yet been confirmed.
- ^{C} indicates a cameo role.
- ^{P} indicates an appearance in onscreen photographs.
- ^{V} indicates a voice-only role.
- ^{Y} indicates a younger version of the character.

Character	Films		
Character	Searching	Run.	Missing
Character	2018	2020	2023
Principal cast
David Kim	John Cho	Mentioned	John Cho^{C}^{P}
Margot Kim	Michelle La Alex Jayne Go^{Y} Megan Liu^{Y} Kya Dawn Lau^{Y}	Mentioned	Mentioned
Det. Sgt. Rosemary Vick	Debra Messing		Debra Messing^{C}^{P}
Robert Vick	Steven Michael Eich		Mentioned
Dianne Sherman	Referenced	Sarah Paulson	Mentioned
Chloe Sherman	Referenced	Kiera Allen Uncredited infant^{Y}	
June Allen			Storm Reid Ava Zaria Lee^{Y} Billie Jordan^{Y}^{P}
Grace Allen Sarah Walker			Nia Long
Supporting cast
Pamela Nam Kim	Sara Sohn		
Peter Kim	Joseph Lee		
Hannah the model (@fish_n_chips)	Erica Jenkins	Erica Jenkins	
Mailman Tom		Pat Healy	
Nurse Kammy		Sara Sohn	
Pharm.D. Kathy Bates		Sharon Bajer	
Brooklyn Boy		Tony Revolori^{V}	
Javier Ramos			Joaquim de Almeida
Kevin Lin			Ken Leung
Agent Elijah Park			Daniel Henney
Heather Damore			Amy Landecker
Veena			Megan Suri
James "Jimmy" Walker			Tim Griffin

== Additional crew and production details ==
Film	Crew/Detail					
Film	Composer	Cinematographer	Editors	Production companies	Distributing companies	Running time
Searching	Torin Borrowdale	Juan Sebastian Baron	Nick Johnson & Will Merrick	Sony Pictures, Screen Gems, Stage 6 Films, Bazelevs Company	Sony Pictures Releasing	1 hr 42 mins
Run.	Torin Borrowdale	Hillary Spera	Nick Johnson & Will Merrick	Lions Gate Films, Summit Entertainment, Search Party Productions, Hulu Original Films	Hulu, Lionsgate	1 hr 29 mins
Missing	Julian Scherle	Steven Holleran	Austin Keeling & Arielle Zakowski	Sony Pictures, Screen Gems, Stage 6 Films, Bazelevs Company, Search Party Productions	Sony Pictures Releasing	1 hr 51 mins

== Reception ==
=== Box office and financial performance ===
Film	Box office gross			Box office ranking		Video sales gross	Worldwide total gross income	Budget	Worldwide total net income	Ref.
Film	North America	Other territories	Worldwide	All time North America	All time worldwide	Video sales gross	Worldwide total gross income	Budget	Worldwide total net income	Ref.
Searching	$26,020,957	$49,620,898	$75,641,855	#3,170	#1,883	$275,861	$75,917,716	$880,000	$75,037,716	
Run.	—N/a	$5,184,368	$5,184,368	—N/a	#9,886	Figures not publicly available	>$5,184,368	$1,000,000	>$4,184,368	
Missing	$31,575,974	$5,100,000	$36,675,974	#2,800	#6,163		>$36,675,974	$7,000,000	≥$29,675,974	
Totals	$57,596,931	$59,905,266	$117,502,197	x̄ #1,990 (Note: This is an approximate average, based on the three movies.)	x̄ #5,977 (Note: This is an approximate average, based on the three movies.)	>$275,861	>$117,778,058	$8,880,000	$108,898,058	

=== Critical and public response ===
Film	Rotten Tomatoes	Metacritic	CinemaScore
Searching	92% (261 reviews)	71/100 (34 reviews)	A−
Run.	89% (141 reviews)	67/100 (20 reviews)	—N/a
Missing	87% (119 reviews)	67/100 (30 reviews)	B
