= Sarah Paulson on screen and stage =

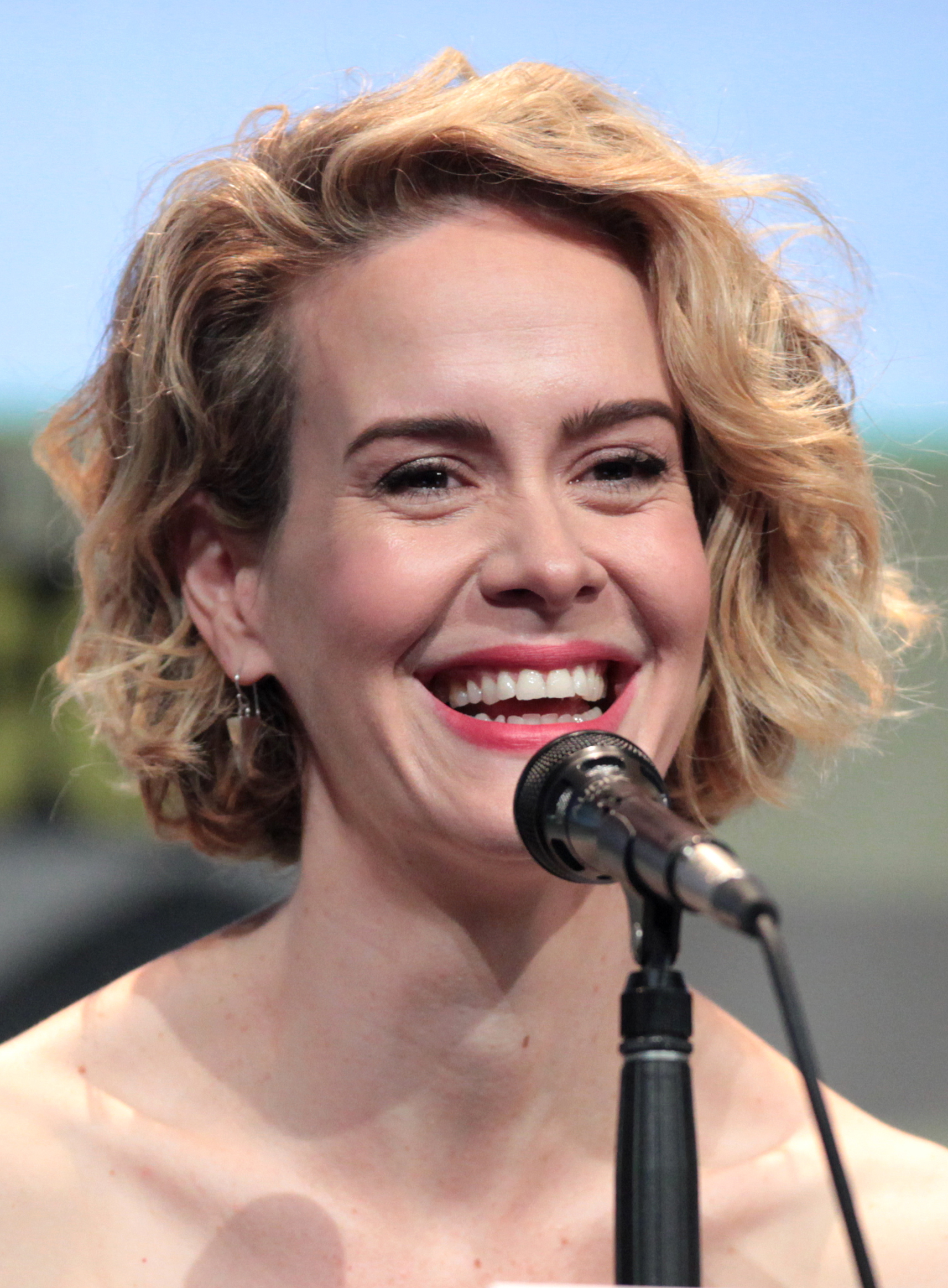
Paulson at the 2015 San Diego Comic-Con

American film, television, and stage actress and director Sarah Paulson began her acting career in New York City stage productions before starring in the short-lived television series American Gothic (1995–1996) and Jack & Jill (1999–2001). She also acted with Jack Lemmon (1998) in The Long Way Home. Her other television work includes Deadwood (2005), Studio 60 on the Sunset Strip (2006–2007), and Cupid (2009). In 2011, Paulson began starring in the FX anthology series American Horror Story, playing various characters over many of the show's 12 seasons. For her performances in the series, she received five Primetime Emmy Award nominations and won two Critics' Choice Television Awards. In 2016, she portrayed real life prosecutor Marcia Clark in The People v. O. J. Simpson: American Crime Story, for which she earned a Primetime Emmy Award and a Golden Globe Award. In 2020, Paulson appeared in the FX miniseries Mrs. America, and began starring as Nurse Mildred Ratched in the Netflix psychological thriller series Ratched. In 2021, she returned to American Crime Story to portray Linda Tripp in the third season of the series, subtitled Impeachment.

Paulson's film roles include the romantic comedies What Women Want (2000) and Down with Love (2003), and the dramas Path to War (2002) and The Notorious Bettie Page (2005). In 2008, she starred as Ellen Dolan in the superhero noir film The Spirit. She starred as Lucy in the independent drama film Martha Marcy May Marlene (2011), Nicolle Wallace in the political drama film Game Change (2012), Mary Epps in the historical drama film 12 Years a Slave (2013), Abby Gerhard in the romantic drama film Carol (2015), Toni Bradlee in the political drama film The Post (2017), Tammy in the heist comedy film Ocean's 8 (2018), Jessica Hayes in the post-apocalyptic thriller film Bird Box (2018), Ellie Staple in the superhero film Glass (2019), and Diane Sherman in the psychological thriller film Run (2020).

== Film ==
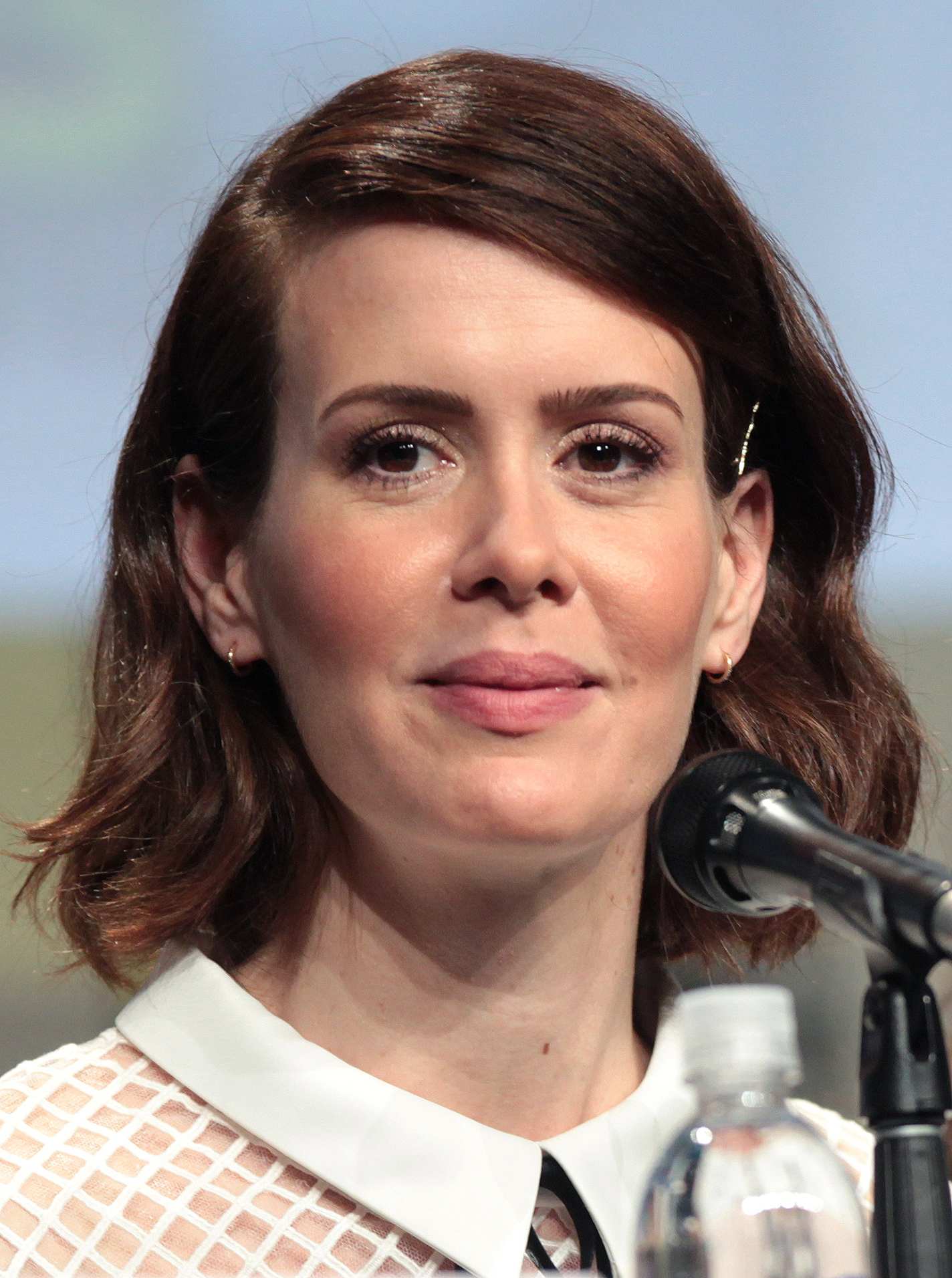
Paulson at the 2014 San Diego Comic-Con

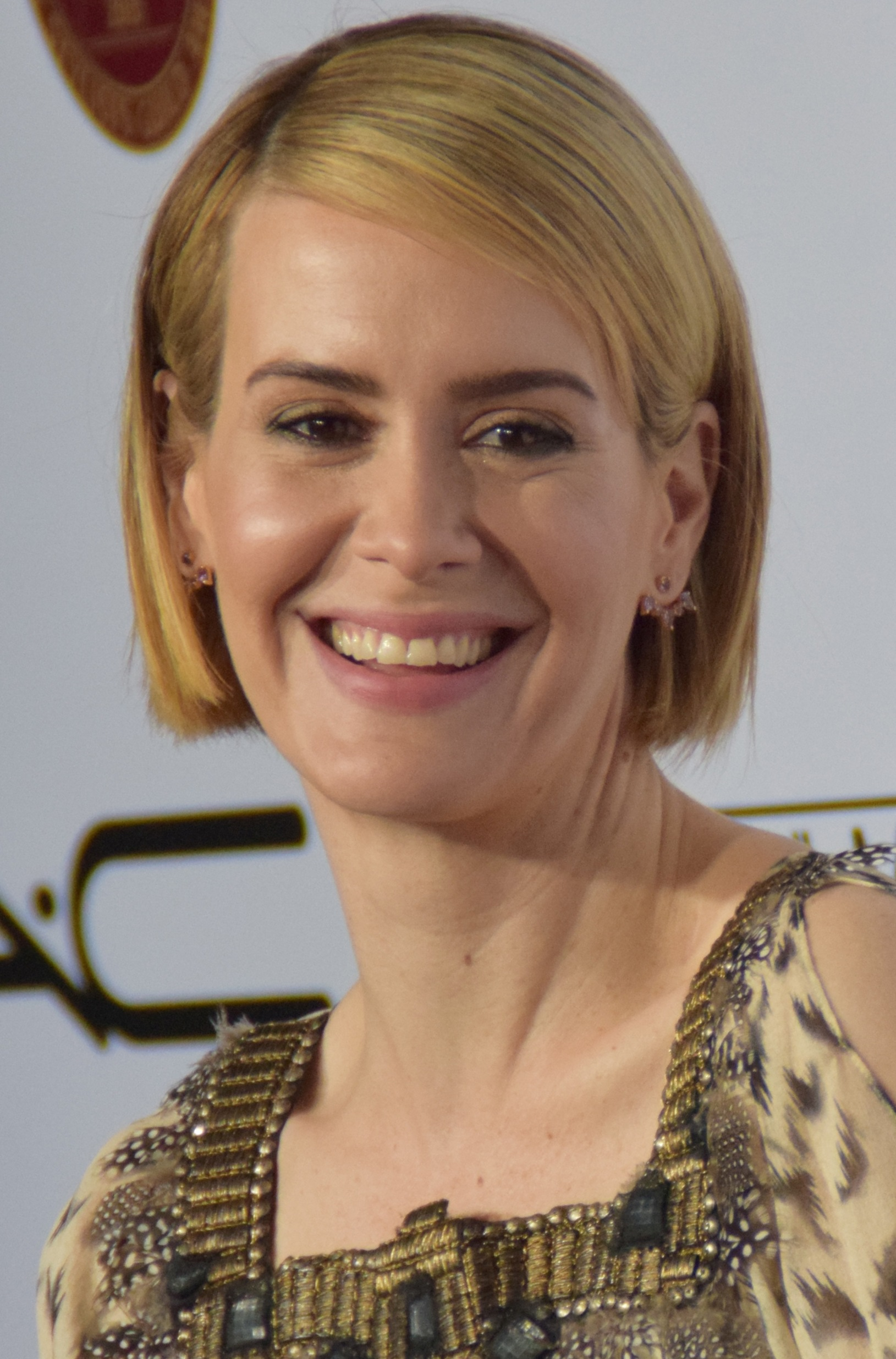
Paulson in February 2015

Year	Title	Role	Notes	Ref.
1997	Levitation	Acey Rawlin		
1999	The Other Sister	Heather Tate		
1999	Held Up	Mary		
2000	What Women Want	Annie		
2002	Bug	Eilleen		
2003	Down with Love	Vikki Hiller		
2005	Swimmers	Merrill		
2005	Serenity	Dr. Caron		
2005	The Notorious Bettie Page	Bunny Yeager		
2006	Diggers	Julie		
2006	Griffin and Phoenix	Peri		
2008	The Spirit	Ellen Dolan		
2011	Martha Marcy May Marlene	Lucy		
2011	New Year's Eve	Grace Schwab		
2012	Mud	Mary Lee		
2012	Fairhaven	Kate		
2012	The Time Being	Sarah		
2012	Stars in Shorts	Woman		
2013	12 Years a Slave	Mary Epps		
2015	Carol	Abby Gerhard		
2015	The Runner	Kate Haber		
2016	Blue Jay	Amanda		
2017	Rebel in the Rye	Dorothy Olding		
2017	The Post	Tony Bradlee		
2018	Ocean's 8	Tammy		
2018	Bird Box	Jessica Hayes		
2019	Glass	Ellie Staple		
2019	The Goldfinch	Xandra Terrell		
2019	Abominable	Dr. Zara (voice)		
2020	Run	Diane Sherman		
2024	Hold Your Breath	Margaret Bellum		
2025	Baby Doe	—N/a	Documentary; executive producer	
2026	Closing Night	Sandra Vale		

Key
†	Denotes films that have not yet been released

== Television ==
Year	Title	Role	Notes	Ref.
1994	Law & Order	Maggie Conner	Episode: "Family Values"	
1995	Friends at Last	Diana	Television film	
1995–1996	American Gothic	Merlyn Temple	Main role	
1996	Shaughnessy	—N/a	Television film	
1997	Cracker	Janice	2 episodes	
1998	The Long Way Home	Leanne Bossert	Television film	
1999–2001	Jack & Jill	Elisa Cronkite	Main role	
2001	Touched by an Angel	Zoe	Episode: "Manhunt"	
2002	Leap of Faith	Faith Wardwell	Main role	
2002	Path to War	Luci Baines Johnson	Television film	
2004	The D.A.	Lisa Patterson	2 episodes	
2004	Nip/Tuck	Agatha Ripp	Episode: "Agatha Ripp"	
2005	Deadwood	Miss Alice Isringhausen	Recurring role	
2006	A Christmas Wedding	Emily	Television film	
2006–2007	Studio 60 on the Sunset Strip	Harriet Hayes	Main role	
2007, 2011	Desperate Housewives	Lydia Lindquist	2 episodes	
2009	Cupid	Claire McCrae	Main role	
2010	Law & Order: Special Victims Unit	Anne Gillette	Episode: "Shadow"	
2010	Grey's Anatomy	Young Ellis Grey	Episode: "The Time Warp"	
2010	November Christmas	Beth Marks	Television film	
2011	American Horror Story: Murder House	Billie Dean Howard	3 episodes	
2012	Game Change	Nicolle Wallace	Television film	
2012	Blue	Lavinia	2 episodes	
2012–2013	American Horror Story: Asylum	Lana Winters	Main role	
2013–2014	American Horror Story: Coven	Cordelia Foxx	Main role	
2014–2015	American Horror Story: Freak Show	Bette and Dot Tattler	Main role	
2015–2016	American Horror Story: Hotel	Sally McKenna	Main role	
2015–2016	American Horror Story: Hotel	Billie Dean Howard	Episode: "Be Our Guest"	
2016	The People v. O. J. Simpson: American Crime Story	Marcia Clark	Main role	
2016	American Horror Story: Roanoke	Shelby Miller / Audrey Tindall	Main role	
2016	American Horror Story: Roanoke	Lana Winters	Episode: "Chapter 10"	
2017	Feud	Geraldine Page	Episode: "And the Winner Is... (The Oscars of 1963)"	
2017	American Horror Story: Cult	Ally Mayfair-Richards	Main role	
2017	American Horror Story: Cult	Susan Atkins	Episode: "Charles (Manson) in Charge"	
2018	American Horror Story: Apocalypse	Wilhemina Venable / Cordelia Foxx	Main role	
2018	American Horror Story: Apocalypse	Billie Dean Howard	Episode: "Return to Murder House"	
2019	Family Guy	Herself / Marcia Clark	Voice; Episode: "You Can't Handle the Booth"	
2020	Mrs. America	Alice Macray	Main role	
2020	Coastal Elites	Clarissa Montgomery	Television film	
2020	Ratched	Mildred Ratched	Main role; also executive producer	
2021	American Horror Story: Double Feature	Tuberculosis Karen	Main role; also executive producer	
2021	American Horror Story: Double Feature	Mamie Eisenhower	Main role; also executive producer	
2021	Impeachment: American Crime Story	Linda Tripp	Main role; also executive producer	
2023	Saturday Night Live	Ms. Jenny	Episode: "Pedro Pascal / Coldplay"	
2023–2025	The Bear	Michelle Berzatto	2 episodes	
2024	Mr. & Mrs. Smith	Therapist	Episode: "Couples Therapy (Naked & Afraid)"	
2025–present	All's Fair	Carrington Lane	Main role; also executive producer	
2026	Monster: The Lizzie Borden Story	Aileen Wuornos	3 episodes	
2026	American Horror Story: 13	Cordelia Foxx	Main role	
2026	American Horror Story: 13	Ms. Wilhemina Venable	2 episodes	
2026	American Horror Story: 13	Sally McKenna / Tuberculosis Karen / Mamie Eisenhower	Episode: "Is That All There Is?"	

Key
†	Denotes television productions that have not yet been released

== Theater ==
Year	Title	Role	Venue	Ref.
1994	The Sisters Rosensweig	Tess Goode (understudy)	Ethel Barrymore Theatre, Broadway	
1994	Talking Pictures	Vesta Jackson	Signature Theatre, Off-Broadway	
1998–1999	Killer Joe	Dottie Smith	SoHo Playhouse, Off-Broadway	
2005	Colder Than Here	Harriet Bradley	Music Box Theatre, Broadway	
2005	The Glass Menagerie	Laura Wingfield	Ethel Barrymore Theatre, Broadway	
2006	The Cherry Orchard	Varya	Mark Taper Forum, regional	
2007	Crimes of the Heart	Meg Magrath	Williamstown Theatre Festival, regional	
2008	Crimes of the Heart	Meg Magrath	Laura Pels Theatre, Off-Broadway	
2009	The Gingerbread House	Stacey	Rattlestick Playwrights Theater, Off-Broadway	
2009	Still Life	Carrie Ann	Lucille Lortel Theatre, Off-Broadway	
2010	Collected Stories	Lisa Morrison	Samuel J. Friedman Theatre, Broadway	
2013	Talley's Folly	Sally Talley	Laura Pels Theatre, Off-Broadway	
2014	Conviction	Leigh	Bay Street Theater, regional	
2023–2024	Appropriate	Toni Lafayette	Hayes Theater, Broadway & Belasco Theatre, Broadway	

== Director ==
Year	Title	Notes	Ref.
2018	American Horror Story: Apocalypse	Episode: "Return to Murder House"	

== See also ==
- List of awards and nominations received by Sarah Paulson
