= List of awards and nominations received by Sarah Paulson =

Sarah Paulson awards and nominations
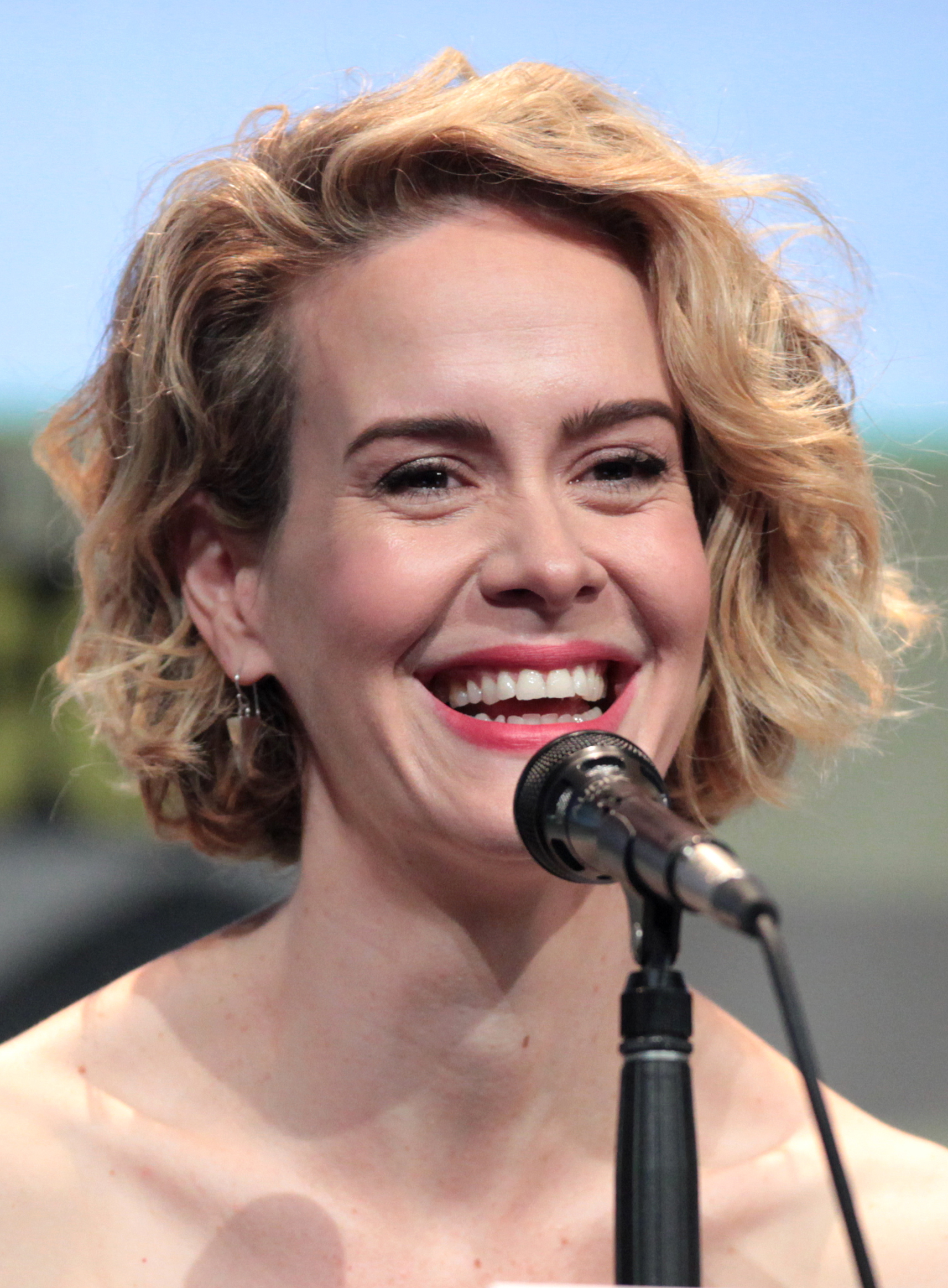
- Paulson at the 2015 San Diego Comic Con
Totals
Award	Wins	Nominations
BFCC Awards	1	1
Critics' Choice Super Awards	0	1
Critics' Choice Television Awards	3	4
Dorian Awards	2	2
Fangoria Chainsaw Awards	1	2
Golden Globe Awards	1	5
Gotham Awards	0	1
HCA TV Awards	1	1
Independent Spirit Awards	1	1
People's Choice Awards	0	1
Primetime Emmy Awards	1	9
Satellite Awards	2	4
Saturn Awards	0	3
Screen Actors Guild Awards	1	2
TCA Awards	1	1
Tony Awards	1	1
WFCC Awards	1	1
Wins	25
Nominations	48

The following is a list of awards and nominations received by Sarah Paulson.

Sarah Paulson is an American actress known for her roles on stage and screen. Over her career she has received several awards including a Primetime Emmy Award, three Critics' Choice Television Awards, a Golden Globe Award, a Screen Actors Guild Award, and a Tony Award.

For her portrayal of Marcia Clark in the FX miniseries The People v. O. J. Simpson: American Crime Story (2016), she won the Primetime Emmy Award for Outstanding Lead Actress in a Limited Series or Movie, the Golden Globe Award for Best Actress – Miniseries or Television Film, and the Screen Actors Guild Award for Outstanding Actress in a Miniseries or Television Movie. She was Emmy-nominated for playing Nicolle Wallace in the HBO television film Game Change (2012), and Linda Tripp in the FX on Hulu limited series Impeachment: American Crime Story (2022).

For her roles in the Ryan Murphy created FX horror anthology series she was Emmy-nominated for Asylum (2013), Coven (2014), Freak Show (2015), Hotel (2016), Cult (2018). She was also nominated for her role as a therapist in the Amazon Prime Video series Mr. & Mrs. Smith (2024). She was Golden Globe-nominated for her roles as Harriet Hayes in the NBC comedy-drama series Studio 60 on the Sunset Strip (2006), and Mildred Ratched in the Netflix series Ratched (2021). For her work in film, Paulson was nominated for the Screen Actors Guild Award for Outstanding Performance by a Cast in a Motion Picture along with the ensemble of the historical drama 12 Years a Slave (2013).

On stage, Paulson won the Tony Award for Best Actress in a Play for playing a daughter who discovers a dark secret about her father's past in the Branden Jacobs-Jenkins play Appropriate (2024). For her performance she also received the Drama Desk Award for Outstanding Lead Performance in a Play, and the Drama League Distinguished Performance Award as well as a nomination for an Outer Critics Circle Award.

== Major associations ==
=== Actor Awards ===
Year	Category	Nominated work	Result	Ref.
2014	Outstanding Cast in a Motion Picture	12 Years a Slave	Nominated	
2017	Outstanding Actress in a Miniseries or Television Movie	The People v. O. J. Simpson: American Crime Story	Won	

=== Critics' Choice Awards ===
Year	Category	Nominated work	Result	Ref.
Critics' Choice Television Awards
2013	Best Supporting Actress in a Movie or Miniseries	American Horror Story: Asylum	Won	
2015	Best Supporting Actress in a Movie or Miniseries	American Horror Story: Freak Show	Won	
2016	Best Supporting Actress in a Movie or Miniseries	American Horror Story: Hotel	Nominated	
2016	Best Actress in a Movie or Miniseries	The People v. O. J. Simpson: American Crime Story	Won	
Critics' Choice Super Awards
2021	Best Villain in a Series	Ratched	Nominated	

=== Emmy Awards ===
Year	Category	Nominated work	Result	Ref.
Primetime Emmy Awards
2012	Outstanding Supporting Actress in a Limited/Anthology Series or Movie	Game Change	Nominated	
2013	Outstanding Supporting Actress in a Limited/Anthology Series or Movie	American Horror Story: Asylum	Nominated	
2014	Outstanding Lead Actress in a Limited/Anthology Series or Movie	American Horror Story: Coven	Nominated	
2015	Outstanding Supporting Actress in a Limited/Anthology Series or Movie	American Horror Story: Freak Show	Nominated	
2016	Outstanding Supporting Actress in a Limited/Anthology Series or Movie	American Horror Story: Hotel	Nominated	
2016	Outstanding Lead Actress in a Limited/Anthology Series or Movie	The People v. O. J. Simpson: American Crime Story	Won	
2018	Outstanding Lead Actress in a Limited/Anthology Series or Movie	American Horror Story: Cult	Nominated	
2022	Outstanding Lead Actress in a Limited/Anthology Series or Movie	Impeachment: American Crime Story	Nominated	
2024	Outstanding Guest Actress in a Drama Series	Mr. & Mrs. Smith	Nominated	

=== Golden Globe Awards ===
Year	Category	Nominated work	Result	Ref.
2006	Best Supporting Actress – Television	Studio 60 on the Sunset Strip	Nominated	
2012	Best Supporting Actress – Television	Game Change	Nominated	
2017	Best Actress – Miniseries or Television Film	The People v. O. J. Simpson: American Crime Story	Won	
2021	Best Actress – Television Series Drama	Ratched	Nominated	
2021	Best Television Series – Drama (as executive producer)	Ratched	Nominated	

=== Tony Awards ===
Year	Category	Nominated work	Result	Ref.
2024	Best Leading Actress in a Play	Appropriate	Won	

== Other theatre awards ==
Organizations	Year	Category	Work	Result	Ref.
Broadway.com Audience Awards	2024	Favorite Performance of the Year (Play)	Appropriate	Nominated	
Broadway.com Audience Awards	2024	Favorite Leading Actress in a Play	Appropriate	Nominated	
Drama Desk Awards	2024	Outstanding Lead Performance in a Play	Appropriate	Won	
Drama League Awards	2024	Distinguished Performance	Appropriate	Won	
Outer Critics Circle Awards	2024	Outstanding Lead Performer in a Broadway Play	Appropriate	Nominated	

== Miscellaneous awards ==
Organizations	Year	Category	Work	Result	Ref.
Black Film Critics Circle	2013	Best Ensemble	12 Years a Slave	Won	
Dorian Awards	2017	TV Performance of the Year — Actress	The People v. O. J. Simpson: American Crime Story	Won	
Dorian Awards	2024	Outstanding Lead Performance in a Broadway Play	Appropriate	Won	
Fangoria Chainsaw Awards	2015	Favorite Actress on TV	American Horror Story: Freak Show	Won	
Fangoria Chainsaw Awards	2017	Best TV Supporting Actress	American Horror Story: Roanoke	Nominated	
Gotham Awards	2011	Best Ensemble Cast	Martha Marcy May Marlene	Nominated	
Hollywood Critics Association TV Awards	2021	Best Actress in a Streaming Series, Drama	Ratched	Nominated	
Hollywood Critics Association TV Awards	2022	Best Actress in a Limited or Anthology Series	Impeachment: American Crime Story	Won	
Independent Spirit Awards	2013	Independent Spirit Robert Altman Award	Mud	Won	
People's Choice Awards	2019	Favorite Drama Movie Star	Glass	Nominated	
Satellite Awards	2006	Best Actress – Television Series Drama	Studio 60 on the Sunset Strip	Nominated	
Satellite Awards	2012	Best Supporting Actress – Television	Game Change	Nominated	
Satellite Awards	2014	Best Supporting Actress – Television	American Horror Story: Freak Show	Won	
Satellite Awards	2017	Best Actress – Miniseries or Television Film	The People v. O. J. Simpson: American Crime Story	Won	
Satellite Awards	2022	Best Supporting Actress – Television	Impeachment: American Crime Story	Nominated	
Saturn Awards	2013	Best Actress on TV	American Horror Story: Asylum	Nominated	
Saturn Awards	2017	Best Actress on TV	American Horror Story: Roanoke	Nominated	
Saturn Awards	2018	Best Actress on TV	American Horror Story: Cult	Nominated	
Television Critics Association Awards	2016	Individual Achievement in Drama	The People v. O. J. Simpson: American Crime Story	Won	
Women Film Critics Circle Awards	2021	Worst Screen Mom of the Year Award	Run	Won	
Diva Awards	2021	Actor of the Year Award	TV & film	Won	

== See also ==
- Sarah Paulson filmography
