= Natalie Qasabian =

American screenwriter and producer

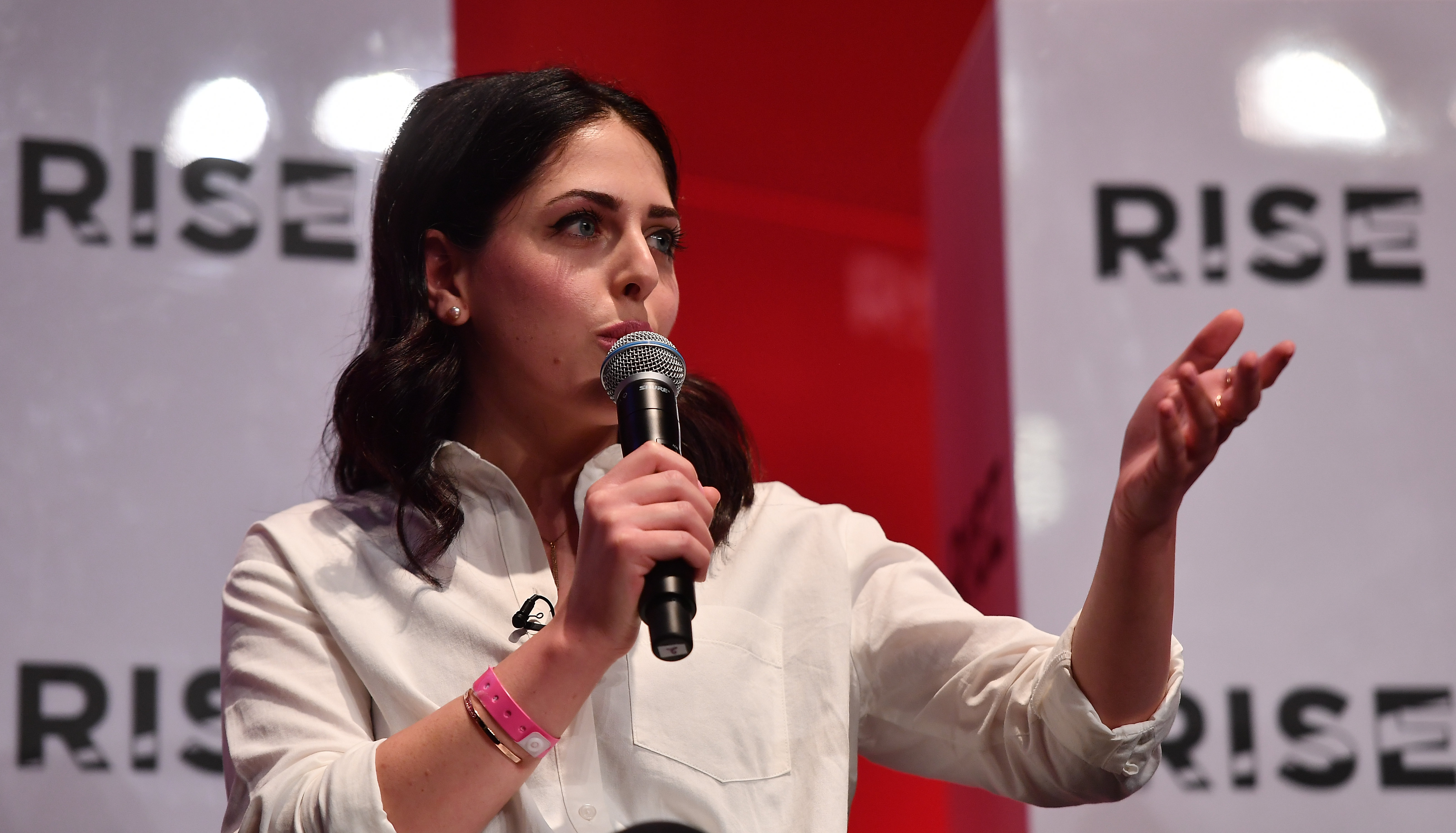
- Qasabian at RISE Conference in Hong Kong, July 2018
- Education: University of Southern California Pepperdine University
- Occupation: Film producer
- Years active: 2015–present
- Notable work: Searching, All About Nina
- Spouse: Sev Ohanian (m. 2020)

Natalie Qasabian (Armenian: Նաթալի Գասապեան) is an American film producer based in Los Angeles. She is best known as a producer of the films Searching, All About Nina and Run.

== Early life ==
Qasabian attended the University of Southern California School of Cinematic Arts. Shortly after graduating, she produced a short film titled Join the Club, directed by Eva Vives, which premiered at the Sundance Film Festival. Qasabian also went on to receive an MBA in business from Pepperdine University.

== Producing career ==
Qasabian and Vives developed Join the Club into a feature film, titled All About Nina, and starring Mary Elizabeth Winstead and Common. All About Nina premiered at the Tribeca Film Festival in 2018 and was acquired by The Orchard.

Qasabian went on to produce three films for the Duplass Brothers Productions, including Duck Butter directed by Miguel Arteta and starring Alia Shawkat. In the episodic space, she produced one of Snapchat’s first scripted series’ Co-Ed, which the New Yorker called out as having “the most formally inventive episode of television in 2018.”

In 2016, Qasabian developed and produced Searching alongside fellow producer and often collaborator Sev Ohanian. Searching is directed by Aneesh Chaganty, co-written by Chaganty and Ohanian, and stars John Cho and Debra Messing. The film premiered at Sundance in 2018 and sold to Sony Pictures Worldwide Acquisitions. Searching was made on a budget of under a million dollars and went on to gross over $75M at the box office. The film also received multiple awards including, the Sundance Next Audience Award and Alfred P. Sloan Award.

Qasabian and Ohanian produced Run, a thriller directed by Chaganty and starring Sarah Paulson and Kiera Allen for Lionsgate. Run was expected to be released on Mother's Day weekend 2020, but due to the coronavirus outbreak was released on Hulu on November 20, 2020 instead.

Qasabian has also produced Missing and executive producing a series for HBO MAX titled The Future.

During the 2021 Sundance Film Festival, Qasabian was the recipient of the Sundance Institute / Amazon Studios Producers Award for Narrative Filmmaking for her film Run.

In 2023, Qasabian participated in Armenian Film Society's Armenian Women in Film and Entertainment panel discussion.

== Personal life ==
Born in the United States, Qasabian is of Armenian descent. She is married to fellow producer Sev Ohanian.
