= Sev Ohanian =

American screenwriter and producer (born 1987)

- Սև Օհանյան
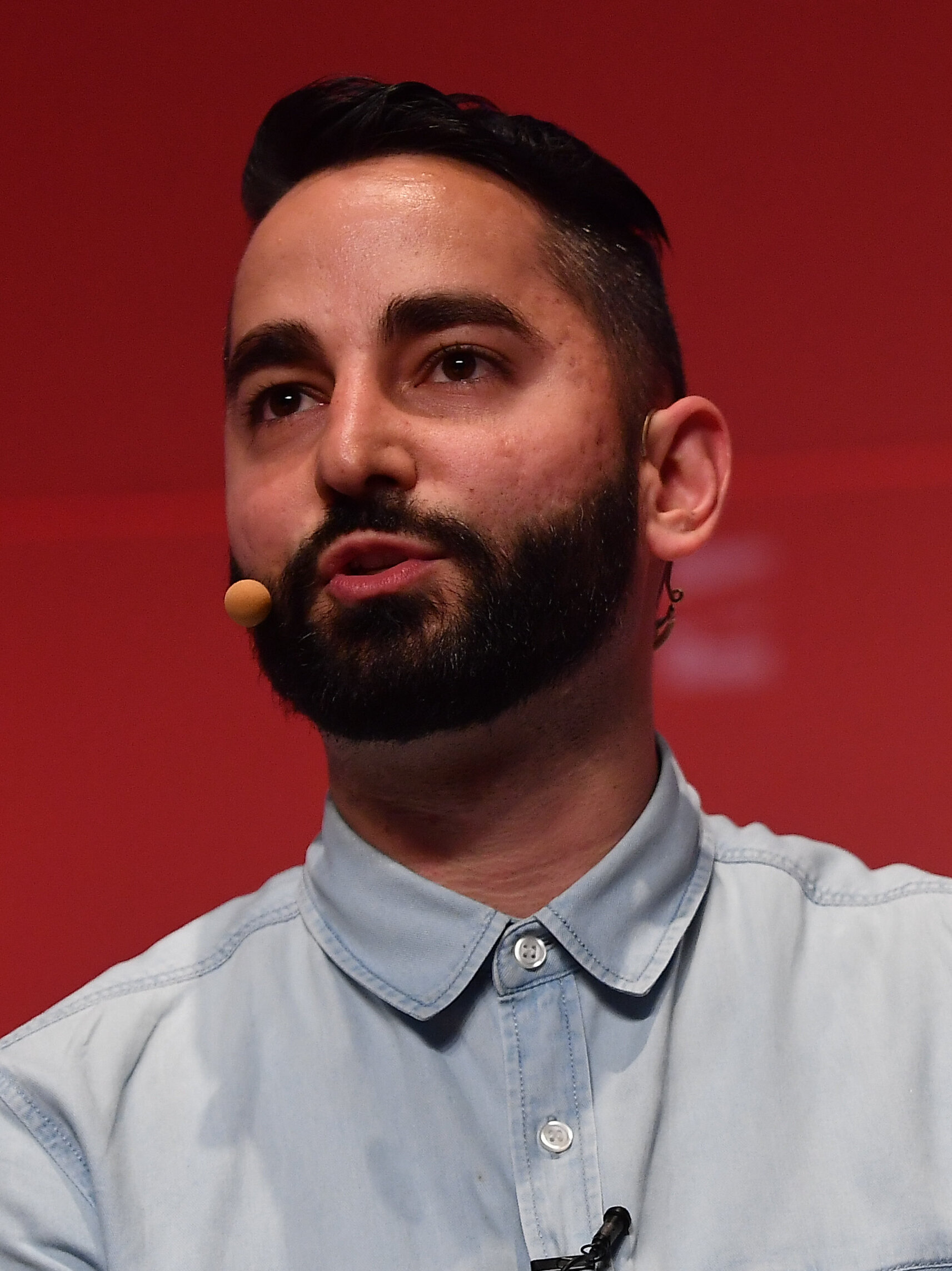
- Ohanian in 2018
- Born: June 2, 1987 (age 39); Hadamar, West Germany
- Education: University of California, San Diego; University of Southern California
- Occupations: Film producer; Screenwriter
- Years active: 2013–present
- Spouse: Natalie Qasabian (m. 2020)

Sevak "Sev" Ohanian (Armenian: Սևակ Օհանյան; born June 2, 1987) is an American film producer and screenwriter. He is best known as the co-writer and producer of the films Searching and Run, executive producer of the films Judas and the Black Messiah and Creed III, and producer of the film Sinners, for which he was nominated for the Academy Award for Best Picture and won a Golden Globe Award. He is one of the founders of the production company Proximity Media, alongside Ryan Coogler and Zinzi Coogler.

== Early life ==
Ohanian was born to an Armenian family in West Germany, and moved to the U.S. when he was four months old. At 20 years old, he wrote, directed and produced a micro-budget film based on his own life, titled My Big Fat Armenian Family. The movie found international success in the Armenian community worldwide, and he used his proceeds from the film to help pay for his tuition to University of Southern California School of Cinematic Arts.

== Career ==
=== 2013–2017: Early career ===
Ohanian dropped out of USC in 2012 on the advice of faculty member John Watson to co-produce Fruitvale Station, written and directed by fellow USC classmate Ryan Coogler. Fruitvale Station went on to win the top audience and grand jury awards in the U.S. dramatic competition at the 2013 Sundance Film Festival, and also was awarded the Prize of the Future at 2013 Cannes Film Festival.

In 2014, Ohanian produced a two-minute Google Glass spot called Seeds, directed by Aneesh Chaganty. The short became an internet sensation after garnering more than one million YouTube views in 24 hours, and earned him a spot on The Wrap's 2014 Innovator's List of "Thought Leaders who are Changing Hollywood." Ohanian produced Andrew Bujalski's film Results, which premiered at Sundance in 2015, and was acquired by Magnolia Pictures. He also produced Clea DuVall's The Intervention, which premiered at Sundance 2016, and was acquired by Paramount.

Ohanian taught producing as an adjunct professor at USC's School of Cinematic Arts from 2014 to 2018.

=== 2018–present: Searching and beyond ===
Ohanian co-wrote and produced the film Searching, starring John Cho and Debra Messing, with his frequent collaborators and fellow USC alums Aneesh Chaganty and Natalie Qasabian. Searching premiered at Sundance in 2018, where it won the NEXT Audience Award and Alfred P. Sloan Feature Film Award, and was theatrically released by Sony Screen Gems, making $75 million worldwide against an $880,000 budget. That year, Ohanian was the recipient of the Sundance Institute/Amazon Studios Narrative Producers Award.

Ohanian co-wrote and produced the film Run, which sold to Lionsgate after a bidding war. Run, which stars Sarah Paulson and Kiera Allen, was released in 2020 on Hulu, dropping plans for a theatrical release due to the worldwide COVID-19 pandemic. In its opening weekend, it broke records as Hulu's most-watched film premiere.

In 2018, Ohanian partnered with Ryan Coogler and Zinzi Coogler to form a multimedia production company, Proximity Media. They have so far produced Space Jam: A New Legacy, starring LeBron James and the Looney Tunes, the Academy Award-winning Judas and the Black Messiah, starring Daniel Kaluuya and Lakeith Stanfield, and Creed III, directed by and starring Michael B. Jordan. Creed III opened to $100.4 million globally, setting a franchise box office record, and went on to gross over $276 million worldwide.

In August 2019, Ohanian was announced as a producer of Missing, the follow-up to Searching, alongside Natalie Qasabian and Aneesh Chaganty. The film was directed by Will Merrick and Nick Johnson, who co-wrote the screenplay based on a treatment by Ohanian and Chaganty.

In February 2021, it was announced Ohanian's company Proximity Media had signed a five-year exclusive TV deal with Disney. Also in 2021, Ohanian was selected by The Hollywood Reporter for their annual 35 under 35 Rising Executives list. Notably his sister, attorney Ramela Ohanian, was also selected for that year's list.

In 2025, Ohanian produced Sinners alongside Ryan Coogler and Zinzi Coogler. The film received critical acclaim, grossed $368 million at the global box office and garnered a record sixteen nominations at the 98th Academy Awards.

In August 2025, Ohanian was named one of Variety's 41 leaders under 40. In September, the Armenian Film Society inducted him into its Armenian Film Hall of Fame, and he was awarded keys to the city of Glendale.

== Filmography ==
Year	Title	Producer	Writer
2008	My Big Fat Armenian Family	Yes	Yes
2013	Fruitvale Station	Co-producer	No
2014	Where Hope Grows	Co-executive	No
2015	Results	Executive	No
2015	Yosemite	Yes	No
2015	Tenured	Executive	No
2015	Memoria	Yes	No
2016	The Intervention	Yes	No
2016	Papa	Executive	No
2017	The Labyrinth	Yes	No
2017	Take Me	Yes	No
2017	Dismissed	Yes	No
2017	Foursome	Co-executive	No
2018	Searching	Yes	Yes
2020	Run	Yes	Yes
2021	Judas and the Black Messiah	Executive	No
2021	Space Jam: A New Legacy	Executive	Uncredited (Note: Brought in for rewrites.)
2023	Missing	Yes	Story
2023	Creed III	Executive	No
2025	Sinners	Yes	No

== Awards and nominations ==
Year	Ceremony	Award	Work	Result
2013	Arpa International Film Festival	Breakthrough Filmmaker of the Year	Himself	Won
2018	Sundance Film Festival	Alfred P. Sloan Feature Film Prize (shared with Aneesh Chaganty)	Himself	Won
2018	Sundance Film Festival	Sundance Institute/Amazon Studios Producers Award	Himself	Won
2026	Golden Globe Awards	Best Motion Picture – Drama	Sinners	Nominated
2026	Golden Globe Awards	Cinematic and Box Office Achievement	Sinners	Won
2026	Academy Awards	Best Picture	Sinners	Nominated
