= Missing (2023 film) =

2023 film by Nick Johnson and Will Merrick

- Theatrical release poster
- Directed by: Will Merrick; Nick Johnson
- Screenplay by: Will Merrick; Nick Johnson
- Story by: Sev Ohanian; Aneesh Chaganty
- Produced by: Natalie Qasabian; Sev Ohanian; Aneesh Chaganty; Timur Bekmambetov
- Starring: Storm Reid; Joaquim de Almeida; Ken Leung; Amy Landecker; Daniel Henney; Nia Long
- Cinematography: Steven Holleran
- Edited by: Austin Keeling; Arielle Zakowski
- Music by: Julian Scherle
- Production companies: Stage 6 Films; Screen Gems; Search Party Productions; Bazelevs Company
- Distributed by: Sony Pictures Releasing
- Release date: January 20, 2023 (United States)
- Running time: 111 minutes
- Country: United States
- Language: English
- Budget: $7 million
- Box office: $48.8 million

Missing is a 2023 American screenlife mystery thriller film written and directed by Will Merrick and Nick Johnson (in their feature directorial debuts) from a story by Sev Ohanian and Aneesh Chaganty, who also produced the film with Natalie Qasabian. The film is a standalone film in the universe of Searching (2018). It stars Storm Reid, Joaquim de Almeida, Ken Leung, Amy Landecker, Daniel Henney, and Nia Long. Its plot follows June Allen, a teenager who tries to find her missing mother after she disappears on vacation in Colombia with her new boyfriend.

An anthology sequel to Searching was announced in 2019, with Merrick and Johnson, who edited the first film, signing on to make their directorial debuts in January 2021. Reid and Long joined the cast in the spring of 2021, and filming took place in Los Angeles from March to May that year after delays due to the COVID-19 pandemic. Missing also serves as a spiritual sequel to Run (2020), directed by Searching director Chaganty and edited by Merrick and Johnson, confirming the fates of that film's characters.

Missing was theatrically released in the United States on January 20, 2023 by Sony Pictures Releasing under their Screen Gems banner. The film received generally positive reviews from critics and grossed $48 million at the box office.

== Plot ==
18-year-old June Allen lives with her single mother, Grace, in Van Nuys, a Los Angeles suburb. Despite being close, June is annoyed at Grace's attempts to micromanage her life. When Grace heads out for a vacation to Cartagena, Colombia with her boyfriend, Kevin, June spends the time partying while trying to avoid Grace's lawyer friend, Heather.

A week later, June awaits her mother and Kevin at Los Angeles International Airport, but they never arrive, and an inquiry at the hotel in Cartagena reveals their luggage never left. When the FBI attaché at the American consulate is unable to get to the footage in time, June decides to investigate herself. She hires Javier, a Colombian gig worker who complies with June's requests for a small fee.

June cracks the password to Kevin's Gmail account, in which she discovers several aliases and a criminal record of scamming many women for their money. Believing Kevin kidnapped her mother, June has Javier look for clues as to their whereabouts in Colombia. She traces Kevin's past movements to a location in Nevada, where she talks to Jimmy, a pastor at a Christian rehabilitation center for ex-convicts. Jimmy tells her Kevin has been rehabilitated and is genuinely in love with Grace. Kevin's online dating profile seemingly confirms this, as past messages reveal Grace was already aware of Kevin's past. FBI agent Elijah informs June he received footage of a band of criminals kidnapping Kevin and Grace in Colombia. June quickly unmasks this as a fabricated event, discovering Kevin had hired a lookalike actress named Rachel to impersonate her mother, who had been kidnapped en route to LAX beforehand. It is revealed Grace went by a different name in the past, sparking online speculation about her character.

Swearing by her mother's innocence, June's suspicions fall on Heather when she discovers an encrypted communication line between her and Kevin. June goes to confront Heather, intending to capture evidence of her wrongdoing. Instead she finds her office ransacked, her computer in the process of being factory reset, and Heather's lifeless body in a storage closet.

Later, June views live footage of a police raid in Colombia focusing on Kevin, who is shot and killed despite surrendering peacefully. Seemingly at a dead end, June is about to give up, but finally figures out the password to her mother's email from old voicemails. Checking her phone's travel history, June discovers her mom never made it to Colombia. While checking through her blocked users, she finds a threatening e-mail directed at Grace, which leads her to discover security cameras Kevin had bought to install at an abandoned house, which turns out to be her childhood vacation home in Nevada. June speaks into the cameras, and discovers the video her mother had previously saved. Before she can view it, Jimmy calls her and reveals he is outside June's door.

Pastor Jimmy reveals he is her father, James Walker, who June thought died of a brain tumor when she was a child. He claims Grace was emotionally unstable and took June away from him after having him arrested under false charges. As James continues going into detail, he inadvertently reveals that both he and Kevin were incarcerated in the same period. June realizes James and Kevin planned the entire ruse. James was a drug addict, domestic abuser, and an obsessive stalker whose abuse and obsessive behavior endangered his family, and Grace had lied to June about his death out of good intentions. It is eventually revealed that James hired Kevin to pose as a prospective boyfriend to find Grace and June, and to then bug June’s laptop so that James could tap into it, spy on June, and block her research.

James kidnaps June and takes her to her old grandpa's house, where Grace is also detained. Realizing James has taken June, Grace puts up a fight, but James shoots her. James tries to leave with June, but the wounded Grace stabs him in the neck with a mirror shard. James locks them up and tries to search for a nearby hospital on his computer, but dies of blood loss. June, realizing that James didn't turn off her laptop when he kidnapped her, uses the audio feed on the security cameras at the house to tell Siri to call 911.

One year later, Grace has recovered from her gunshot wound, and June is off at college. Their story has also been adapted on Unfiction, and Javier reunites with his estranged son, also beginning a friendship with Grace. Preparing for a visit home, June texts her mother she loves her, and Grace responds she loves her too.

== Cast ==
- Storm Reid as June Allen
  - Ava Zaria Lee as 4-year-old June
  - Jasmin Savoy Brown as herself playing June in Unfiction
- Nia Long as Grace Allen, June's mother
- Joaquim de Almeida as Javier Ramos
- Ken Leung as Kevin Lin
- Amy Landecker as Heather Damore, Grace's friend
- Tim Griffin as James Walker, Grace's ex-husband
- Megan Suri as Veena, June's best friend
- Lisa Yamada as Alison
- Daniel Henney as Agent Elijah Park
- Michael Segovia as Angel
- Lauren B. Mosley as Rachel Page
- Tracy Vilar as Detective Gomez
- Sean O'Bryan as Radio Host

== Production ==
In August 2019, a standalone sequel to Searching (2018) was announced to be in development, with the original film's director, Aneesh Chaganty, clarifying that the story would not "follow the same characters or plot line as the original", making the series an anthology. In November 2020, producer Natalie Qasabian said the COVID-19 pandemic had postponed production on the film, simply going under the title Searching 2. In January 2021, it was announced that Will Merrick and Nick Johnson, the editors on the first film and Chaganty's Run (2020), would write and direct the film in their directorial debuts, with additional literary material by Micah Ariel Watson, and producer of Unfriended and Searching Timur Bekmambetov to executive produce the sequel with Ohanian, Chaganty, and Qasabian. In the following months, Storm Reid and Nia Long joined the cast.

Principal photography took place from March 30 to May 30, 2021, in Los Angeles, California. In September 2022, the film's title was revealed to be Missing, with the film set for a 2023 release date.

Same as with Searching, all on-screen computer user interface elements were reconstructed from scratch as vector graphics using Adobe Illustrator during post-production. This allowed the editors, Austin Keeling and Arielle Zakowski, to have complete control over every computer application, webpage and mouse movement, in addition to not being limited by the resolution of traditional screen recordings. Screen elements were animated in Adobe After Effects.

== Release ==
Missing was theatrically released in the United States on January 20, by Sony Pictures Releasing under their Screen Gems banner. It was originally scheduled for February 24, 2023.

=== Home media ===
Missing was released on digital platforms on March 7, 2023, and on DVD and Blu-ray on March 28, 2023. It was then released on Netflix on May 20, and became the number 1 most streamed movie in the US within 2 days.

== Reception ==
=== Box office ===
Missing grossed $32.5 million in the United States and Canada, and $16.3 million in other territories for a worldwide total of $48.8 million.

Missing made $3.4 million on its first day, including $760,000 from Thursday night previews. It went on to debut to a $9.2 million weekend, finishing fourth behind holdovers Avatar: The Way of Water, Puss in Boots: The Last Wish and M3GAN. The film made $5.7 million in its second weekend, finishing in sixth.

=== Critical response ===
On the review aggregator website Rotten Tomatoes, 88% of 148 critics' reviews are positive, with an average rating of 6.8/10. The website's consensus reads: "Missing can strain credulity in its efforts to keep the audience guessing, but a fast pace and relatable fears keep this twisty techno-thriller from completely losing its way." Metacritic, which uses a weighted average, assigned the film a score of 66 out of 100, based on 32 critics, indicating "generally favorable" reviews. Audiences surveyed by CinemaScore gave the film an average grade of "B" on an A+ to F scale, while those polled by PostTrak gave it an 81% positive score, with 60% saying they would definitely recommend it.

== See also ==
- List of films featuring surveillance
