= Searching (film) =

2018 film by Aneesh Chaganty

- Theatrical release poster
- Directed by: Aneesh Chaganty
- Written by: Aneesh Chaganty; Sev Ohanian
- Produced by: Timur Bekmambetov; Sev Ohanian; Natalie Qasabian; Adam Sidman
- Starring: John Cho; Debra Messing
- Cinematography: Juan Sebastian Baron
- Edited by: Nick Johnson; Will Merrick
- Music by: Torin Borrowdale
- Production company: Bazelevs Company
- Distributed by: Screen Gems; Stage 6 Films (through Sony Pictures Releasing)
- Release dates: January 21, 2018 (Sundance); August 24, 2018 (United States)
- Running time: 102 minutes
- Country: United States
- Language: English
- Budget: $880,000
- Box office: $75.6 million

Searching is a 2018 American screenlife mystery thriller film directed by Aneesh Chaganty in his feature debut, written by Chaganty and Sev Ohanian and produced by Timur Bekmambetov. Set almost entirely on computer screens and smartphones, the film follows a father (John Cho) trying to find his missing 16-year-old daughter (Michelle La) with the help of a police detective (Debra Messing). This was the first mainstream Hollywood thriller headlined by an Asian-American actor.

A co-production between the United States and Russia, the film premiered at the Sundance Film Festival on January 21, 2018. It was released in a limited release on August 24, 2018, before opening wide on August 31, 2018 by Sony Pictures Releasing. The film was a financial and critical success, grossing over $75 million worldwide against a $880,000 budget. At the Independent Spirit Awards, Cho was nominated for Best Male Lead. The film's success launched a titular film series including a standalone installment titled Run, and a follow-up titled Missing.

== Plot ==
David Kim lives in San Jose, California with his daughter, Margot. His wife, Pamela, was diagnosed with lymphoma and died before Margot entered high school.

Margot tells David that she is with a study group and will be there all night. Later that night, Margot attempts to call David three times, but he is asleep. The next day, David is unable to contact Margot. Believing she is at her piano lesson, David calls the instructor, but is told that Margot canceled her lessons six months earlier. David files a missing person report, and the case is assigned to Detective Rosemary Vick. Through her social media accounts, David learns that Margot has become a loner since Pamela's death. He discovers Margot had pocketed the piano lesson money and transferred the $2,500 to a now-deleted Venmo account. Vick reports Margot made a fake ID and shows traffic camera footage of her car outside the city, suggesting she may have run away.

Unconvinced, David discovers Margot had been using a streaming site called YouCast, and befriended a young woman named Hannah. Vick reports Hannah's innocence, having been sighted in Pittsburgh at the time of the disappearance. From Margot's Tumblr account, David discovers she frequently visited Barbosa Lake near the highway where she was last seen. He finds her Pokémon keychain there, and the police discover her car in the lake, which contains an envelope with $2,500. A search party is organized, but a storm delays the operation.

After David has an altercation with a boy who claims to know Margot's whereabouts, Vick tells him he can no longer participate in the investigation. Undeterred, David visits TMZ, which displays the crime scene photographs, and notices his brother Peter's jacket. He discovers text messages between Margot and Peter that suggest an incestuous relationship. Upon confrontation, Peter explains they were only smoking marijuana and confiding in each other. He chastises David for being negligent towards Margot, who is still grieving Pamela's death. Vick calls David and tells him an ex-convict named Randy Cartoff confessed to raping and killing Margot before committing suicide.

An empty-casket funeral is arranged. As David uploads photos to a funeral streaming site, he notices the website's stock photograph features a picture of Hannah. Discovering she is a stock model, he contacts her, and she reveals that she does not know Margot and that the police never called her. David calls Vick to report this, but instead reaches a police dispatcher, who reveals Vick was not assigned to the case but volunteered. He discovers she knew Cartoff through a volunteer program for ex-convicts. Reporting this to the sheriff, David confronts Vick, who is arrested at the funeral.

Vick agrees to confess, in exchange for leniency for her son, Robert. Having a crush on Margot, Robert used the YouCast account as Hannah to get close to her. Margot sent money to Robert's Venmo account, believing he was a working-class girl whose mother had cancer. Ashamed for lying, Robert wanted to confess and return the money in person, so he followed Margot to Barbosa Lake to reveal himself. He surprised her by getting into her car, and she ran, with him accidentally pushing her off a cliff into a 50-foot-deep ravine. Assuming the accident was fatal and could be perceived as manslaughter or even first-degree murder, Vick decided to cover up the incident, pushing the car into the lake and fabricating the fake ID evidence. After David found the car, Vick turned Cartoff into the fall guy and staged his confession.

Vick reveals Margot is still in the ravine, suggesting that even if she had survived the fall, she could not have lived five days without water. David tells the police to return to the ravine, remembering the storm on the third day of the search, which would have provided water. The rescue crew finds Margot severely injured but alive.

Two years later, Margot applies for college to major in piano. David tells her Pamela would have been proud of her. Margot changes her desktop picture from one of Pamela and her to the one David sent her of the two of them after the rescue, reflecting a closer relationship between them.

== Cast ==
- John Cho as David Kim, Margot's father
- Debra Messing as Detective Vick
- Michelle La as Margot Kim, daughter of David and Pamela
- Sara Sohn as Pamela Nam Kim, Margot's mother
- Joseph Lee as Peter, David's brother

== Production ==
The original conception was an 8-minute short film. When Aneesh Chaganty and Sev Ohanian pitched the concept to The Bazelevs Company, the latter suggested it could be expanded into a feature film. While Ohanian was open to the offer and saw its potential, Chaganty was hesitant, since he believed a feature film would stretch the concept and feel too gimmicky. But after coming up with the intro, they felt the film would work. The character, Rosemary Vick, was named after Rosemary's Baby and The Shield's character Vic Mackey. Actor John Cho turned down the role of David Kim at first because he felt that the concept of a movie seen entirely through TV, phone and computer screens was not feasible.

The film was shot on various devices. These include GoPro, drone (unmanned aerial vehicle), news helicopters, mini dv cameras, webcam, and even director Aneesh Chaganty's iPhone, which became the main camera. The scenes between Cho's David Kim and Debra Messing's Rosemary Vick were all shot in one house, with Cho on one side of the house and Messing at the other. Actress Michelle La described the filming process as a "logistical nightmare".

It took 13 days to film, but it took about one and a half years to edit the movie.

In early stages, computer screen recordings were used to draft the film. Later in the process, editors Will Merrick and Nick Johnson constructed the on-screen user interface elements as vector graphics using Adobe Illustrator and Adobe Photoshop. This allowed them to zoom in very close to UI elements in their virtual photography without degrading the video quality to the limited pixels in raster graphics that comes out of traditional screen recording. The on-screen virtual footage was essentially constructed from scratch and animated using Adobe After Effects.

Initially started as a joke, an alien invasion subplot was created by using snippets of news articles, Facebook comments, or hashtags and "fit into the timeline and main plot of Searching without taking away from it."

Cho also said in an interview that the production crew made him look older in the movie by drawing lines on his face since his character had a teenage daughter.

== Release ==
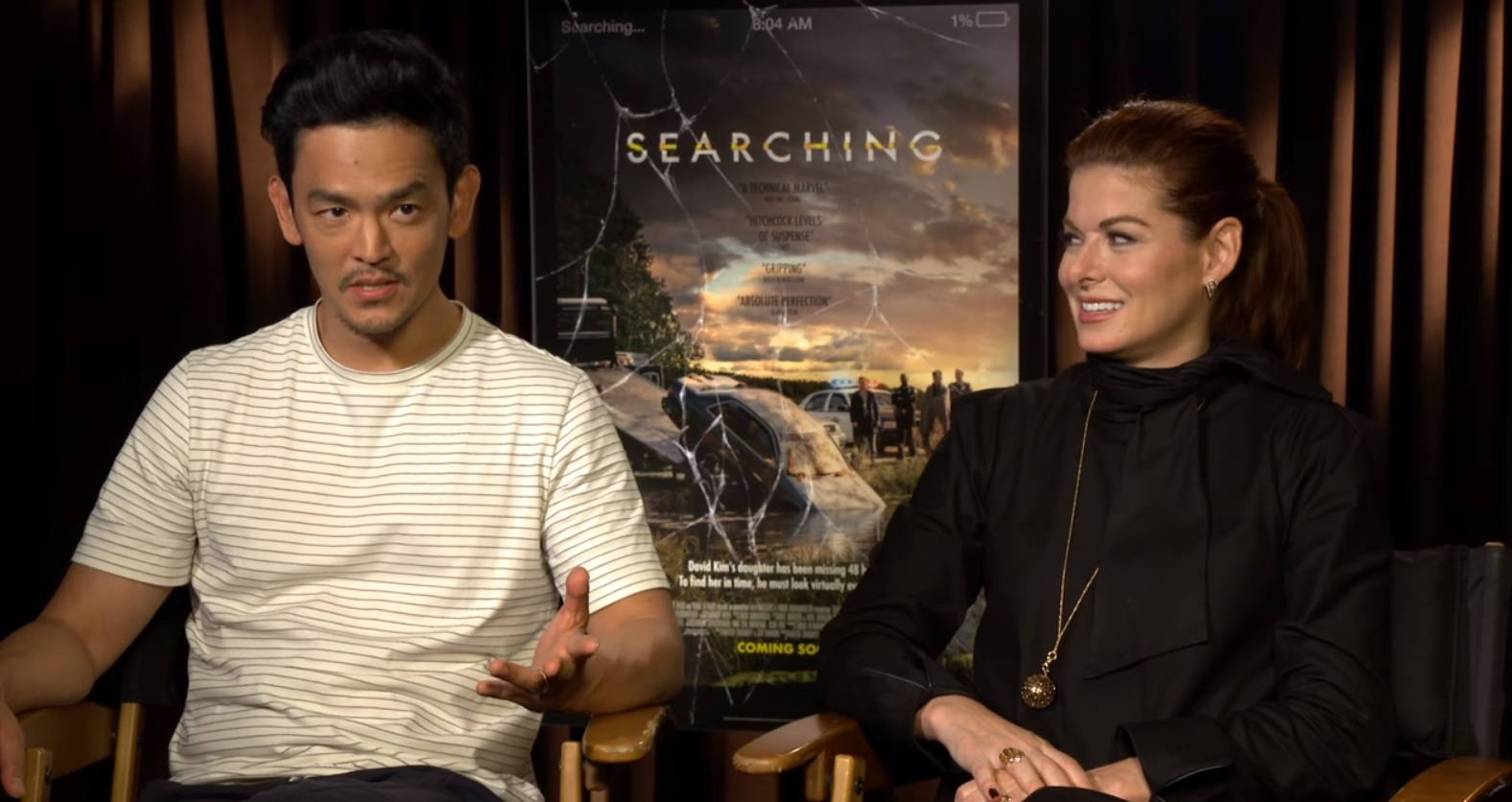
John Cho and Debra Messing promoting Searching

The film had its world premiere at the Sundance Film Festival on January 21, 2018, under the title Search. Shortly after, Sony Pictures Worldwide Acquisitions acquired distribution rights to the film for $5 million. It was initially scheduled to be released on August 3, 2018, but was pushed back to a limited release on August 24, 2018, before opening wide on August 31, 2018.

It was screened at the 28th Busan International Film Festival as part of 'Korean American Special Exhibition: Korean Diaspora' on 6 October 2023.

== Reception ==
=== Box office ===
Searching grossed $26 million in the United States and Canada, and $49.4 million in other territories, for a total worldwide gross of $75.5 million.

Searching debuted to $388,769 from nine theaters in its limited opening weekend, for a per-venue average of $43,197. It expanded to 1,207 theaters on August 31, and was projected to gross $3 million over the weekend. It ended up making $6.1 million (including $7.6 million over the four-day Labor Day frame), finishing fourth at the box office. In its second weekend of wide release, the film was added to an additional 802 theaters, and grossed $4.5 million, finishing fifth. It then made another $3.2 million in its third week of wide release.

=== Critical response ===
On the review aggregator website Rotten Tomatoes, 92% of 260 critics' reviews are positive, with an average rating of 7.5/10. The website's consensus reads: "Searching's timely premise and original execution are further bolstered by well-rounded characters brought to life by a talented cast." Metacritic, which uses a weighted average, assigned the film a score of 71 out of 100, based on 34 critics, indicating "generally favorable" reviews. Audiences polled by CinemaScore gave the film an average grade of "A" on an A+ to F scale, while PostTrak reported filmgoers gave it a 78% overall positive score.

Variety's Peter Debruge called the film "so unique in its approach that Sundance can only program something of its kind once before the gimmick gets old." Kate Erbland of IndieWire gave the film a grade of "B+" and called it "a true storytelling feat, married with sharp editing that makes the entire effort not only seamless, but also wholly intuitive," also saying, "Aneesh Chaganty's drama transcends its gimmick, offering up a smart and refreshing spin on movies that literally play out on small screens." Screen Rant's Chris Agar gave the film four out of five stars, and summed it up as "a suspenseful drama, buoyed by its innovative film making style and collection of strong performances by its leads." He added, "Even if Searching didn't make effective use of its technology angle, the core story would still work due to Chaganty's script, which packs an emotional punch from its first moments and never holds back."

Peter Travers of Rolling Stone gave the film four out of five stars and wrote "director Aneesh Chaganty, in an exceptional feature debut, does the impossible, building a high-voltage, white-knuckle thriller told almost exclusively through smartphones, laptop screens, browser windows and surveillance footage. Searching is a technical marvel with a beating heart at its core, which makes all the difference". Aisha Harris of The New York Times wrote, "While a somewhat silly reveal in the final act feels ripped from a Law & Order episode, the combination of clever concept reflecting the prevalence of screens in everyday life, and the pleasure of watching a typically underused Mr. Cho take on a meaty lead role make Searching a satisfying psychological thriller."

== Sequel ==
On August 14, 2019, a sequel was announced to be in development. Chaganty clarified that the story will not "follow the same characters or plot line as the original." On January 13, 2021, it was announced that the first film's editors, Will Merrick and Nick Johnson, would write the screenplay for and direct the sequel, based on a treatment by Chaganty and Ohanian.

== Accolades ==
- 2018: Alfred P. Sloan Prize at 2018 Sundance Film Festival
- 2018: NEXT Audience Award at 2018 Sundance Film Festival
- 2018: Sundance Institute / Amazon Studios Narrative Producer Award to producer Sev Ohanian at 2018 Sundance Film Festival
- 2019: Independent Spirit Award for Best Male Lead nomination (John Cho; lost to Ethan Hawke for First Reformed)
- 2019: Saturn Award for Best Thriller Film (nominated)
