= List of mobile movie screening clubs in Los Angeles =

There are many mobile movie screening clubs that are generally based around a different nationality or film genre that will take over venues in LA in their off hours to stage screening-based events often with live music or speakers. They will do morning matinees or midnight movie marathons which draw crowds to venues with already booked schedules.

The predominant venues that host these events are The Vintage Vista Theater, Bob Baker Marionette Theater, and the Cinefamily theater (before it was shut down). Specific clubs will operate out of other venues like the Zebulon Cafe Concert, The Downtown Independent, Aero Theater, Los Feliz 3, Egyptian Theatre, and Bearded Lady’s Mystic Museum. The wide range of venues speaks to the fact that the mobile movie screening clubs are pervasive throughout Los Angeles. Highly successful clubs, like Secret Movie Club have even built their own viewing spaces.

== List of screening clubs ==
- Secret Movie Club
  - Dedicated to screening films on celluloid
- La Collectionneuse
  - A franco-centric screening series
- El Cine
  - A non profit dedicated to promoting Latinx culture through movie screenings and events
- Acropolis Cinema
  - A non profit screening series dedicated to bringing classic and contemporary experimental, international, and undistributed films
- Cinematic Void
  - Screening series focuses on cult films and oddball gems of all genres
- Friday Night Frights
  - Bi-weekly midnight screenings of horror and genre films
