= Armenian Film Society =

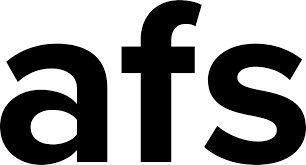
- Logo
- Abbreviation: AFS
- Formation: 2015; 11 years ago
- Type: Film society
- Purpose: Entertainment, film movement, film screening
- Location(s): Glendale, California; London, England
- Region served: United Kingdom; United States
- Leader: Armen and Mary Karaoghlanian
- Website: armenianfilmsociety.com

The Armenian Film Society (AFS) is an American film society dedicated to Armenian cinema.

== History ==
=== Early years (2015–2022) ===
The organization launched in 2015 with a screening of Atom Egoyan's Next of Kin.

Early film screenings included Sergei Parajanov's Shadows of Forgotten Ancestors and The Legend of Suram Fortress

In September 2019, the Armenian Film Society first announced the news that Armenian-American screenwriter Mardik Martin had died. In February 2020, the organization criticized the Academy of Motion Picture Arts and Sciences for the failure to include Martin in the In Memoriam segment during the 92nd Academy Awards.

=== Centennial of Armenian cinema (2023–present) ===
In 2023, the centennial of the Armenian film industry, Armenian Film Society launched its Armenian Film Festival.

In celebration of Sergei Parajanov's centennial, the organization partnered with the Academy Museum of Motion Pictures to screen The Color of Pomegranates, as well as the world premiere of the restoration of Mikhail Vartanov's Parajanov: The Last Spring. In an interview with Deadline Hollywood, Martiros Vartanov, the director's son, stated, "I'm very grateful to The Academy and UCLA for presenting this."

In April 2024, Armenian Film Society held a screening of Inna Sahakyan's Aurora's Sunrise as part of University of Southern California's Armenian History Month programming. Later that month, as part of the City of Glendale's 2024 Armenian genocide Week of Remembrance, the organization held a screening of Arman Nshanian's Songs of Solomon.

The Armenian Film Society participated in the 2024 HollyShorts Film Festival, held at the Chinese Theatre, by presenting four short films.

In June 2024, the organization collaborated with American Cinematheque to host a screening of Menace II Society at the Egyptian Theatre, including a discussion with director Allen Hughes.

In July 2024, Armenian Film Society supported the "100 Years of Parajanov" programming at the Museum of the Moving Image in New York City.

The organization partnered with the Los Angeles Philharmonic, sponsoring their Igor Stravinsky and Aram Khachaturian program in July 2024.

In October 2024, the Armenian Film Society announced their expansion into the United Kingdom with the creation of a branch in London, named Armenian Film Society London. The branch will be spearheaded by curator Kira Adibekov and filmmaker Tatevik Ayvazyan.

In 2024, Armenian Film Society served as a community partner for American Cinematheque's "Three Homelands: A Sergei Parajanov Retrospective", alongside organizations including GALAS LGBTQ+ Armenian Society and South East European Film Festival.

In 2025, the organization is launching its Armenian Film Hall of Fame with producer Sev Ohanian as its initial inductee.

== Major events ==
The Armenian Film Society's "flagship events" are the annual Armenian Film Festival and the Armenian Women in Film and Entertainment panel discussion.

=== Armenian Film Festival ===
In 2023, the centennial of the Armenian film industry, the organization launched its Armenian Film Festival, with events held at Alex Theatre, Laemmle Glendale and Hero House. The festival included book signing events for producer Howard Kazanjian and the American premiere of Michael A. Goorjian's Amerikatsi. At the festival, co-founder Armen Karaoghlanian stated, "Hopefully [audiences] can walk away with a better understanding of who Armenians are because they might hear about the struggles we are going through, [but] I can't think of a better way to really understand the [Armenian] people than through film."

The 2024 festival, held at LOOK Cinemas, featured the American premiere of Atom Egoyan's Seven Veils. In an interview at the event, co-founder Armen Karaoghlanian reflected on the growth of Armenian cinema, noting that "It wasn't too long ago when, you know, you'd say 'Armenian film' or 'Armenian cinema', and you might think of a certain type of film. You know, maybe, you'd think of Soviet Armenian films, maybe you'd think of some of the stuff you'd find on T.V., but I think in recent years, and especially this year, that bar is getting much higher, year over year, and I want people to walk away not saying 'I saw a good Armenian film' or a great Armenian film, I want to say 'I saw a great film,' period."

The 2025 festival included the Los Angeles premiere of Monsieur Aznavour.

=== Armenian Women in Film and Entertainment ===
In 2023, the organization held its first Armenian Women in Film and Entertainment panel discussion, featuring film and television editor Yvette M. Amirian, media personality Sona Movsesian, producer Fuliane Petikyan, actor Angela Sarafyan, and producer Natalie Qasabian.

The 2024 event was moderated by Sona Movsesian, featuring concept artist Joanna Bush, business manager Anna DerParseghian, actress Alexandra Hedison, and film publicist Teni Karapetian.

The 2025 event, again moderated by Sona Movsesian, featured makeup artist and actress Helen Kalognomos, filmmaker and actress Diana Madison, entertainment attorney Ramela Ohanian, and director Natalie Shirinian.
