= American Cinematheque =

Cultural organization in Los Angeles, California, US

- Formation: 1984; 42 years ago
- Founder: Gary Essert; Gary Abrahams; Sydney Pollack
- Type: Non-profit
- Location: Los Angeles, California, United States
- Website: americancinematheque.com

The American Cinematheque is an independent, non-profit cultural organization in Los Angeles, California, United States, that represents the public presentation of the moving image in all its forms.

It presents festivals and retrospectives that screen the best of worldwide cinema, video, and television from the past and present, ranging from the classics to the outer frontiers of the art form. Cinematheque also provides a forum where film lovers and students can learn from established filmmakers, actors, writers, editors, cinematographers, and others about their craft.

== History ==
In 1981, Filmex, the Los Angeles International Film Exposition organized by Gary Essert and Gary Abrahams, awarded Elizabeth Taylor the Filmex Trustees Award and raised $90,000 for the creation of a cinematheque with the declared aim that it would eventually build on the work of Filmex and provide year-round film programming of classic and new films from around the world at a proposed Los Angeles Film Center.

After Essert was forced to resign from Filmex in 1983, the Cinematheque was created by Essert, Abrahams and Sydney Pollack in 1984. Lawyer and United Artists employee Kenneth Kleinberg became co-chairman of the board with Pollack. The Cinematheque was modeled on the Cinémathèque française and British Film Institute.

By 1985, Essert had raised over $1 million for the Cinematheque towards a $10 million goal to enable the Cinematheque to have a permanent home at a redeveloped Pan-Pacific Center that was proposed at the time. The same year, the Cinematheque started screening films, starting with a three month Special Showcase honoring the Museum of Modern Art starting November 1 at the Doolittle Theatre with a restored version of D. W. Griffith's 1920 film Way Down East with a live orchestra.

Early board members and trustees included Barry Diller, Robert Fitzpatrick, Wallis Annenberg, Candice Bergen, Allan Carr, Francis Coppola, Jane Fonda, Goldie Hawn, David Hockney, Louis Malle, Barry Manilow, Diana Muldaur, Mike Nichols, Paul Schrader, Martin Scorsese and Robert Wise. In 1986, the board of trustees of Filmex voted to merge with the Cinematheque however the Cinematheque board would not approve it unless Filmex's debts were cleared.

== Theaters ==
Between 1987 and 1998, the Cinematheque presented its programs at a variety of venues, including the Directors Guild of America theater and the Raleigh Studios complex in Hollywood. In December 1998, it opened its own permanent home at Grauman's Egyptian Theatre in Hollywood, and in 2004 added a second theater, the Aero Theatre, in Santa Monica. It now presents festivals, retrospectives, and assorted programs at these two theaters and the Los Feliz 3 Theatre.

In 1998, the American Cinematheque completed a major $12.8 million renovation of the Egyptian Theatre that restored the theater's exterior, and added new film, video, and audio technology. In May 2020, the theater was sold to Netflix.

== Programming ==
=== Film Festivals ===
The American Cinematheque is home to a number of annual film festivals, which cover diverse topics, genres, and international cinemas. Its annual Beyond Fest is the highest attended genre film festival in the U.S.

For the last 22 years, the Cinematheque has partnered with the Film Noir Foundation on its longest running festival, Noir City: Hollywood, that celebrates the history of film noir. Nitrate Nights, one of The American Cinematheque's newer film festivals, offers rare chances to see films on 35mm nitrate film base, a format abandoned in the early 1950s due to its highly flammable quality. Since being retrofitted to project nitrate safely in 2016, the Cinematheque has partnered with such film archives as the George Eastman Museum, the Library of Congress, the Academy Film Archive and the UCLA Film and Television Archive to bring archival prints to the screen for the public.

The Cinematheque also partners annually with the Hollywood Foreign Press Association to present the Golden Globe Foreign-Language Nominees Series, which includes screenings of the year's nominations for the Golden Globe Award for Best Foreign Language Film. Every year, the series has culminated in a panel discussion symposium with the directors of the five nominated films.

==== Other Notable Film Festivals ====
- The All Night Horrorthon at the Aero
- Recent Spanish Cinema
- Cinema Italian Style
- German Currents
- Canada Now
- Starring Europe: New Films from the EU
- Screwball Comedy Festival
- Etheria Film Night Annual Showcase

==== Past Film Festivals ====
- EW's CapeTown Film Festival
- Festival of Fantasy, Horror, and Science Fiction
- Brutal Youth Festival with Entertainment Weekly

It has also presented Mods & Rockers Festival a festival of rock-culture films first presented in 1999.

=== Other Regular Film Series ===
The Cinematheque also hosts a number of regular screening series year-round including:

- Cinematic Void
- Art Directors Guild Film Society
- Greg Proops Film Club
- Etheria Monthly Screening Series

=== Retrospectives ===
In 2024, American Cinematheque, with the help of community partners including Armenian Film Society and GALAS LGBTQ+ Armenian Society, hosted "Three Homelands: A Sergei Parajanov Retrospective", focusing on the director's films about his three homelands: Shadows of Forgotten Ancestors (Ukraine), The Color of Pomegranates (Armenia), and The Legend of Suram Fortress and Ashik Kerib (Georgia).

=== Award program ===
In addition to its year-round programs, the organization presents the prestigious American Cinematheque Award annually to a filmmaker in recognition of contributions to the art form. In the 20 years since the award's inception, many major filmmakers have been honored, including directors such as Steven Spielberg, Martin Scorsese, Ron Howard, and Rob Reiner, producer Jerry Bruckheimer, and actors including Eddie Murphy, Bette Midler, Mel Gibson, Bruce Willis, Samuel L. Jackson, Denzel Washington, and Jodie Foster.

=== Former Distribution ===
American Cinematheque's distribution arm was set up in 1999 as Vitagraph Films.

== Participation by industry leaders ==
The organization is governed by a board of directors and a board of trustees. Each board has included prominent leaders in the entertainment industry, including directors and producers such as Sydney Pollack, Martin Scorsese, Mike Nichols, Francis Coppola, William Friedkin, Melvin Van Peebles, Brian Grazer, Joe Dante, Paula Wagner, and Steve Tisch. Other prominent board members include actors Candice Bergen and Goldie Hawn.

The current board of directors is chaired by talent agent Rick Nicita (former co-chairman of Creative Artists Agency). It also contains journalist Peter Bart (former editor in chief of Variety); film producer Jason Blum; film executive Franklin Leonard; film director Michael Mann; former studio chief Mike Medavoy; film producer Paula Wagner; and David Zaslav, current CEO and president of Warner Bros. Discovery. Original co-chairman Kenneth Kleinberg is still on the board of directors.
