= Aneesh Chaganty =

American film director and screenwriter

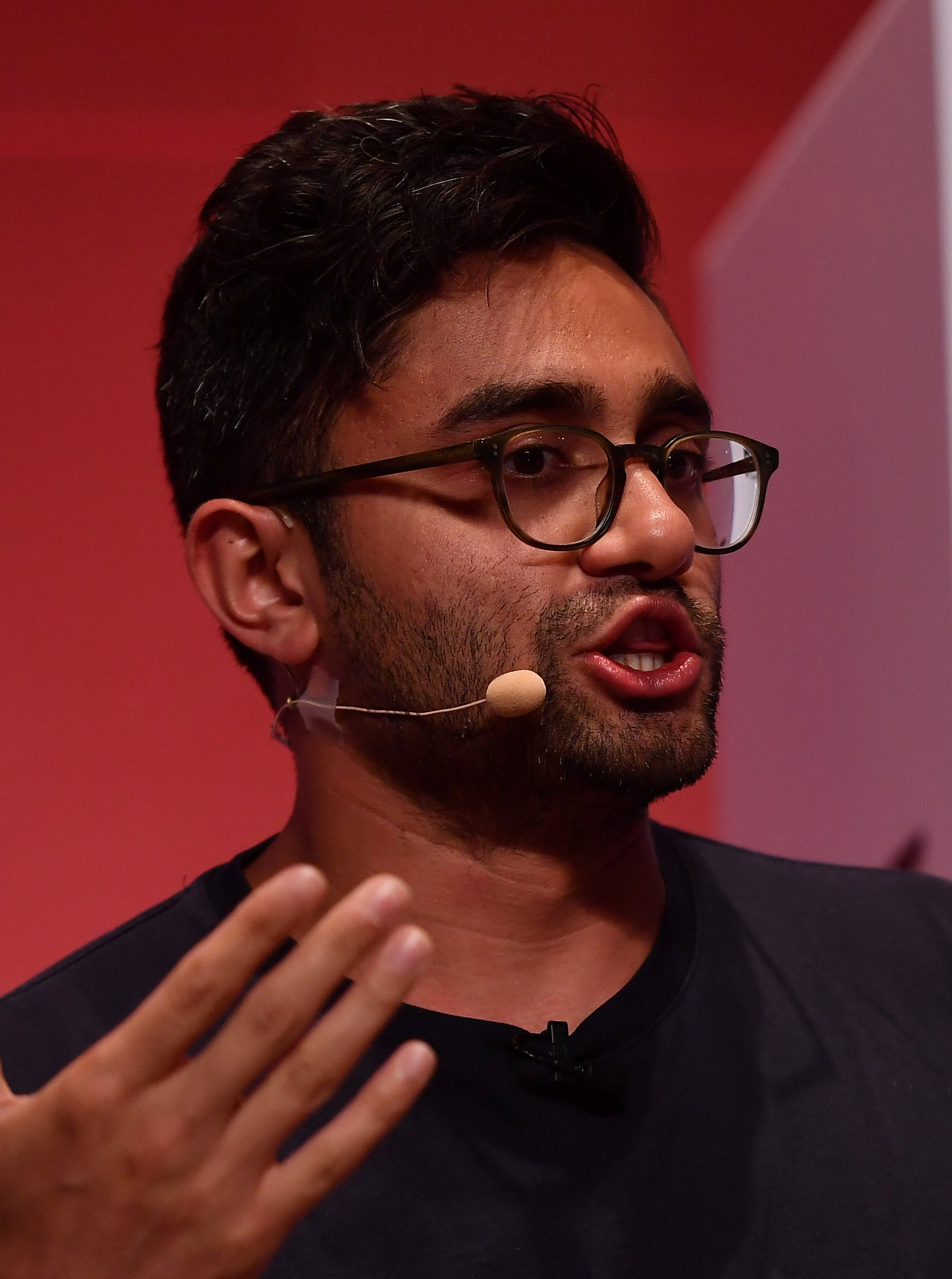
- Chaganty at the 2018 RISE Conference in Hong Kong
- Born: 1991 or 1992 (age 35 or 34); Redmond, Washington, U.S.
- Education: University of Southern California
- Occupations: Film director; screenwriter
- Years active: 2011–present
- Children: 1

Aneesh Chaganty (/əˈniːʃ ˈtʃɑːɡənti/;Telugu pronunciation: [əniːʂ tʃɑːɡəɳʈi] born 1991 or 1992) is an American film director and screenwriter. He made his feature film directorial debut with the 2018 thriller Searching, for which he won the Alfred P. Sloan Feature Film Prize at the 2018 Sundance Film Festival.

== Early life and education ==
Aneesh Chaganty was born in either 1991 or 1992 in a Telugu family in Redmond, Washington, and was raised in San Jose, California. His parents, who originally emigrated from Andhra Pradesh, India, moved to the United States in the 1980s.

His father, who obtained an MS degree in computer engineering from Drexel University, serves as a director and Chief Technology Officer at a software publishing, consultancy and supply company founded by both his parents, AppEnsure Inc. Chaganty attended Valley Christian High School from 2005 to 2009. He graduated from USC School of Cinematic Arts in 2013 with a degree in film and television production.

== Career ==
=== 2014–2017: early career ===
In 2014, Chaganty's two-minute short film, a Google Glass spot called Seeds, became an internet sensation after garnering more than 1 million YouTube views in 24 hours. Following its success, Chaganty was invited to join the Google 5 team at Google Creative Lab in New York City, where he spent two years writing and directing Google commercials. He also made one for Super Bowl.

=== 2018-2023: Searching film series ===
After working on over 25 short films and videos, Chaganty directed his first feature film, Searching, which was originally pitched as a short film but was offered a production budget for a feature instead, was released on August 24, 2018, before opening wide on August 31, also premiering at the Sundance Film Festival on January 21, 2018.

Chaganty's second film Run, a thriller starring Sarah Paulson and Kiera Allen, was set to be released on January 24, 2020, then May 8, 2020, but was pushed back because of the COVID-19 pandemic, was released on Hulu on November 20, 2020. Run became Hulu's most watched feature title ever during its opening weekend beating not only all previously watched Hulu Originals Films, but also licensed SVOD film titles, and ranked as the most talked about Hulu Original Film to date on Twitter. It was later released internationally by Netflix on April 2, 2021.

Missing, an anthology sequel to Searching, was premiered at Sundance Film Festival on January 19, 2023, and released theatrically on January 20. Chaganty wrote the story with Sev Ohanian and they co-produced it alongside Natalie Qasabian. It was released by Netflix on May 20, 2023, and became number one most streamed movie in the US in just two days, where it dominated the Top 10 chart for a week and was watched for 5.2 million hours during that first week on the platform streaming giant.

=== 2024-present ===
In 2024, Chaganty collaborated with Meta in partnership with Blumhouse to make a short film using Meta Movie Gen, an AI video generating tool by the tech giant, titled i h8 ai. The short film was featured on Meta's Movie Gen site and their YouTube channel.

== Recognition ==
Chaganty was included in the 2019 Forbes 30 Under 30 Hollywood & Entertainment list.

In 2021, he was featured in the December issue of Vanity Fair, representing Gold House as an AAPI leading member.

== Filmography ==
=== Short film ===
Year	Title	Director	Writer	Editor	Notes
2007	Nug	Yes	Yes	Yes	Also producer
2008	The Sound of Evanescence	Yes	Yes	Yes	
2009	Starving!	Yes	Yes	Yes	
2011	Alibi	Yes	Yes	No	
2012	Monsters	Yes	Yes	Yes	
2012	Microeconomics	Yes	No	No	
2012	Adventure, Wisconsin	Yes	Yes	No	Also sound editor and producer
2014	Seeds	Yes	Yes	No	Sponsored by Google Glass
2024	i h8 ai	Yes	Yes	No	Partnered with Blumhouse for Meta Movie Gen

=== Feature film ===
Year	Title	Director	Writer	Producer
2018	Searching	Yes	Yes	No
2020	Run	Yes	Yes	No
2023	Missing	No	Story	Yes

=== Acting credits ===
Short film

Year	Title	Role
2010	The Liaison	Himself
2014	Google Glass: Seeds	Traveller
2024	i h8 ai	Himself

Television

Year	Title	Role	Note
2018	Made in Hollywood	Himself	Season 13, episode 46

== Awards and nominations ==
Year	Award	Category	Film	Result
2018	Locarno Film Festival	Variety Piazza Grande Award	Searching	Nominated
2018	Sundance Film Festival	Best of Next!	Searching	Won
2018	Sundance Film Festival	Alfred P. Sloan Feature Film Prize (shared with Sev Ohanian)	Searching	Won
2018	Sydney Film Festival	Best Narrative Feature	Searching	Nominated
2018	Los Angeles Online Film Critics Society Awards	Best First Feature	Searching	Nominated
