= Cinematic Void =

Film screening series

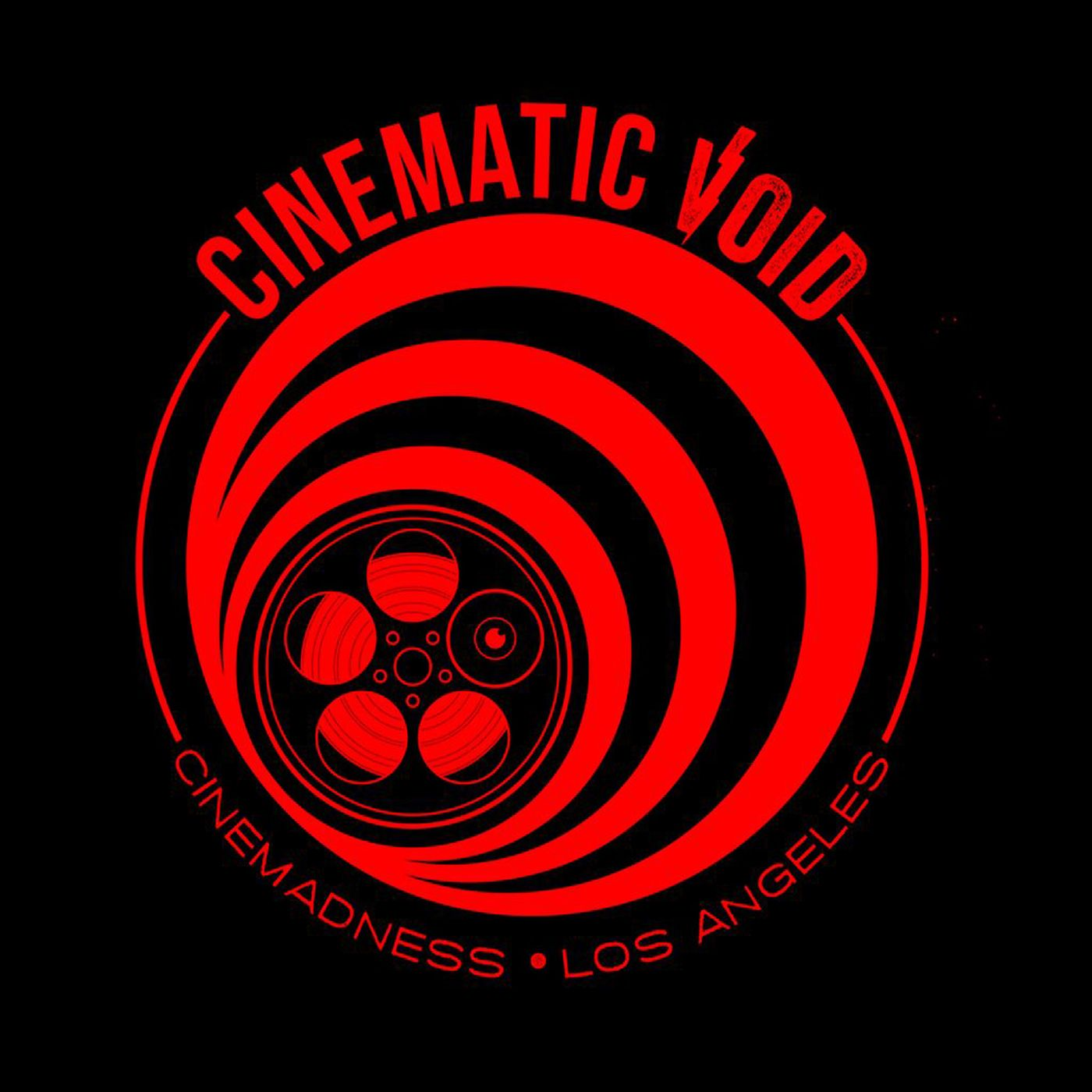
- Cinematic Void logo
- Genre: File screening series - cult, oddball, weird, strange and genre films
- Frequency: Monthly
- Founded: 2016
- Founders: James Branscome
- Website: www.cinematicvoid.com

Cinematic Void is a monthly film screening series with live events in Los Angeles at the Los Feliz 3, the Egyptian Theatre, and the Aero Theatre through the American Cinematheque. Created by James Branscome in 2016 with the guidance of Beyond Fest programmer Grant Moninger, Cinematic Void screens strange, obscure, and cult films of all genres. Screening events often include clip shows, special guests, and contests.

== Sub-series ==
Cinematic Void has several themed sub-series: Camp Void, Voidentines, January Giallo, the Cinematic Void Up All Night virtual series, and programming during Beyond Fest.

== Partners ==
Cinematic Void is partnered with the American Cinematheque and has partnered with film distributors Severin Films, Arrow Video, and Vinegar Syndrome for film restoration premieres.

== Podcast ==
Cinematic Void has a dedicated podcast co-hosted by James Branscome and Nick Vance with special guests and in-depth discussions of cult and genre films.

== See also ==
- List of film festivals
- List of mobile movie screening clubs in Los Angeles
- American Cinematheque List of Regular Film Series
