= Screenlife =

Film subgenre where events are shown on a screen of a device

Screenlife or computer screen film is a form of visual storytelling in which events are shown entirely on a computer, tablet, or smartphone screen. It became popular in the 2010s owing to the growing impact of the Internet and mobile devices. Within a video essay, the format is often called desktop documentary.

== Self-imposed limitations ==
According to Timur Bekmambetov, the Russian-Kazakh producer of the film Searching, a computer screen film should take place on one specific screen, never move outside of the screen, the camerawork should resemble the behavior of the device's camera, all the action should take place in real time, without any visible transitions and all the sounds should originate from the computer. There have, however, also been movies that switch between screens and are still categorized as screenlife. Most notably, Searching ends with a few scenes that look as if they were television broadcasts.

== Features ==
Screenlife footage can be displayed on devices such as a computer, smartphone, smart TV or tablet and show actions of the main character on the device, such as web browsing, online chatting and video calling. Screenlife films can be made in different genres, including horror, thriller, comedy. It was originally regarded as a new storytelling format because the computer or smartphone screen is used in journalism and advertising as a visual source. Screenlife takes elements from the pseudo-documentary and found footage formats (e.g. The Blair Witch Project, Paranormal Activity).

The earliest experimentations of a combination of a classic film format and the use of computer screens were made in the 2000s such as the drama Thomas in Love and the horror film The Collingswood Story shows everything through the web cameras of the main characters.

In 2014, the full-length screenlife film Unfriended by Levan Gabriadze was released. It earned $64 million at the box office on a budget of $1 million, and spawned a sequel called Unfriended: Dark Web in 2018.

Another successful screenlife film was the 2018 thriller Searching directed by Aneesh Chaganty. The main roles were played by John Cho and Debra Messing. The film received the Alfred P. Sloan Prize at the Sundance Film Festival and collected in world box office over $75 million with a budget of about $700,000 and received a sequel, Missing, in 2023.

== Format ==
In the screenlife format the movement of the cursor is sometimes important because the viewer's attention is concentrated on it.

Screencasting software is usually used to decorate the device screen, and a GoPro camera is used for shooting. The cast members often need to be the camerapeople to bring life to the film.

== See also ==
- Found footage
- Real time
- Screencast
- Films about computers
