= Levitation (film) =

- DVD cover
- Directed by: Scott D. Goldstein
- Written by: Scott D. Goldstein
- Produced by: Scott D. Goldstein
- Starring: Sarah Paulson; Ernie Hudson; Jeremy London; Ann Magnuson
- Cinematography: Michael Wojciechowski
- Edited by: Scott D. Goldstein
- Music by: Leonard Rosenman
- Distributed by: Northern Arts Entertainment Inc
- Release date: 1997
- Running time: 99 minutes
- Country: United States
- Language: English

Levitation is a 1997 American drama film directed and produced by Scott D. Goldstein. The motion picture stars Sarah Paulson in her film debut, Ernie Hudson and Benjamin Heflin.

== Plot ==
Sarah Paulson portrays Acey Rawlin, a teenage girl who gets pregnant after spending the night with a man she just met. Acey's only friend, a fisherman named Bob, may be imaginary. And when Acey tells her mother Anna about her problems, Anna chooses this moment to tell Acey that she's adopted, which causes her to search out her birth mother.

== Cast ==
- Sarah Paulson as Acey Rawlin
- Ernie Hudson as "Downbeat"
- Jeremy London as Bob
- Ann Magnuson as Anna Rawlin / Sara Fulton
- Christopher Boyer as Mr. Rawlin, Acey's Father
- Grand L. Bush as Toby Banks
- Antonio Fargas as Otis Hill
- Brett Cullen as James
- Stephanie Hawkins as Elizabeth Fulton
- Jim Kamm as Peter Fulton
- Karen Witter as Ranch Woman

== Crew ==
- Lauren M. Gabor - Production Designer
- Scott D. Goldstein - Director, Editor, Producer, Screenwriter
- Leonard Rosenman - Composer (Music Score)
- Fred M. Wardell - Editor
- William Fiege - Sound/Sound Designer
- Shelly Strong - Producer
- Julie Ashton-Barson - Casting
- Brian Bettwy - First Assistant Director
- Abigail Mannox - Art Director
- Michael Wojciechowski - Cinematographer

== Company Information ==
- Strong Productions - Production Company
- Tenth Muse Productions - Production Company
- Northern Arts Entertainment Inc - Domestic Theatrical Distributor
