= Run (2020 American film) =

2020 film by Aneesh Chaganty

- Theatrical release poster
- Directed by: Aneesh Chaganty
- Written by: Aneesh Chaganty; Sev Ohanian
- Produced by: Natalie Qasabian; Sev Ohanian
- Starring: Sarah Paulson; Kiera Allen
- Cinematography: Hillary Spera
- Edited by: Nick Johnson; Will Merrick
- Music by: Torin Borrowdale
- Production companies: Summit Entertainment; Search Party Productions
- Distributed by: Hulu; Lionsgate
- Release dates: October 8, 2020 (Nightstream); November 20, 2020 (United States)
- Running time: 89 minutes
- Country: United States
- Language: English
- Box office: $5.2 million

Run (referred to on-screen as Run.) is a 2020 American psychological horror thriller film directed by Aneesh Chaganty, and written by Chaganty and Sev Ohanian. The film stars Kiera Allen as disabled teenager Chloe Sherman, who begins to suspect that her mother, Diane (Sarah Paulson), has been keeping a dark secret about her upbringing. The film has connections to other films by Chaganty and Ohanian and is the second installment in the filmmaking duo's Searching film series.

Run was released in the United States via streaming on November 20, 2020, on Hulu, and was released in other territories both theatrically and through streaming by Lionsgate International and by Netflix on April 2, 2021. The film received generally positive reviews from critics and became Hulu's most successful original film upon its release.

== Plot ==
A woman named Diane Sherman gives birth to a premature baby.

Years later, Diane lives a quiet life with Chloe, her now teenage daughter, in Pasco. Chloe suffers from arrhythmia, hemochromatosis, asthma, and diabetes, as well as paralysis in her legs. She uses a wheelchair, takes multiple medications daily, and is homeschooled by her mother. Chloe is inquisitive and resourceful, spending her free time building electronics and circuit boards. She desires to go to college, but has received no responses to her applications.

One morning, Chloe finds a prescription bottle of green pills with Diane's name on the label. She sees that a label bearing her name has been pasted over the original. She tries to research the pills—Trigoxin—but discovers the house has no internet connection, unaware Diane is watching her. The next day, Chloe dials a random number from her mother's bedroom phone and asks the answering stranger to look up the drug. He tells her it is a heart medication and has the form of small red pills.

At the movie theater, Chloe pretends to go to the bathroom and rushes to the pharmacy across the street. The pharmacist reveals the green pills are actually a relaxant called Ridocaine, which are for dogs and, if taken by a human, could cause leg paralysis. Chloe begins to hyperventilate before Diane runs in and sedates her.

Chloe wakes up in bed and finds her bedroom door locked from the outside, while Diane is out. She breaks out by dragging herself onto the roof, making her way to her mother's bedroom and breaking the window with a soldering iron and water. She begins to have an asthma attack and manages to retrieve her inhaler. She tries to use her automated wheelchair ramp to go downstairs, but Diane has cut the power cord. She is forced to throw her wheelchair down the stairs and falls, discovering that she can move one of her toes, due to having not taken Ridocaine in the last few days.

Outside, Chloe flags down Tom, the postal worker. She asks him to contact the police but he confronts Diane, who sedates him. Chloe hyperventilates again and blacks out. When she awakens, she is in the basement of her house, with her wheelchair chained to a steel pole as Diane drags Tom's body through the hallway.

There, Chloe discovers her childhood photos, which show her walking, a death certificate for a baby named Chloe who died two hours after birth, and an article about a couple who had their baby stolen from the same hospital. She also finds college acceptance letters that were hidden from her. Chloe accuses Diane of poisoning her and lying and faking her medical conditions. Diane insists that everything she did was to protect Chloe. She fills a syringe with a homemade neurotoxin, saying it will make her forget. Terrified, Chloe crawls away and locks herself in a closet. She swallows a bottle of organophosphate, forcing Diane to rush her to the hospital.

Chloe wakes up in a hospital bed, intubated and barely able to move. Diane insists that Chloe be discharged, but doctors refuse until the latter has been evaluated by a mental health professional, as her actions were viewed as a suicide attempt. Chloe signals to a nurse, who brings her a crayon and paper before leaving for a code blue. Diane ties Chloe to a wheelchair to escape. The nurse returns to find Chloe's finished note reading "MOM", which prompts her to alert hospital security. As Diane tries to find an exit, Chloe is able to move her foot and hold the chair in place, delaying her escape. Diane aims her gun at the guards, causing one to shoot her in the arm and send her down the stairs.

Seven years later, Chloe still relies on her wheelchair, though she is able to walk short distances using a cane. She visits a correctional facility where Diane is confined to a bed in the infirmary ward, her health seemingly deteriorated. Chloe talks about the life she has built for herself: her husband Ara, her daughter, Annie, and her job as a prosthetist. She says that Annie prefers Chloe's grandparents more than Ara's, implying that Chloe has been reunited with her birth parents. Before leaving, she takes out three Ridocaine pills and instructs Diane to "open wide".

== Cast ==
- Sarah Paulson as Diane Sherman, Chloe's mother.
- Kiera Allen as Chloe Sherman, Diane's daughter.
- Pat Healy as Tom, a mailman.
- Sara Sohn as Kammy, a hospital nurse.
- Sharon Bajer as Kathy Bates, a homage to the actress of the same name.
- Tony Revolori as Brooklyn Boy (voice)

== Production ==
In June 2018, it was announced Lionsgate would produce, distribute, and finance the film, with Aneesh Chaganty directing, from a screenplay he wrote alongside Sev Ohanian. Ohanian and Natalie Qasabian produced the film. In October 2018, Sarah Paulson joined the cast of the film, and in December 2018, Kiera Allen was set to star as well.

Principal photography in Winnipeg, Canada began on October 31, 2018, and wrapped on December 18, 2018.

Torin Borrowdale composed the film's score, as he previously collaborated with Chaganty in Searching. According to Borrowdale, the goal for the film's musical direction was to achieve "the essence of Bernard Herrmann, but for a 2020 cinematic experience." The film was a joint production between Summit Entertainment, Lions Gate Films, Search Party Productions, and Hulu Original Films.

== Release ==
Run was originally scheduled to be theatrically released on May 8, 2020, coinciding with Mother's Day weekend, although as a result of the COVID-19 pandemic, its release was delayed indefinitely. Lionsgate intended to announce a new release date "once there is more clarity on when movie theaters" will reopen.

In August 2020 however, with the pandemic's continued influence on the film industry, Hulu acquired American distribution rights to the film, and it debuted exclusively through them via streaming on November 20, 2020. The movie was released in other continents under Lionsgate International banner.

Netflix later acquired international streaming rights and released the film on April 2, 2021.

== Reception ==
=== Audience viewership ===
Following its debut weekend, Hulu reported that Run was the most-watched original film in the platform's history, as well as the most talked about on Twitter.

=== Critical response ===
On review aggregator Rotten Tomatoes, the film holds an approval rating of 88% based on 139 reviews, with an average rating of 7.1/10. The site's critics consensus reads, "Solid acting and expertly ratcheted tension help Run transcend its familiar trappings to deliver a delightfully suspenseful thriller." On Metacritic, it has a weighted average score of 67 out of 100, based on 20 critics, indicating "generally favorable reviews".

Jessica Gomez of AllHorror.com wrote, "If you're like me and you were captivated by the story of Gypsy Rose and her mother Dee Dee Blanchard, then I've got a psychological thriller with your name on it." Ryan Lattanzio of IndieWire gave the film a "C+" and said, "There's enough go-for-broke and whiplash-inducing shifts in tone on display to suggest this filmmaking duo has a future, even when their characters don't seem to have a past."

Rahul Desai of Film Companion wrote, "The film doubles up as an allegory and indictment of modern parenting – the control disguised as caregiving, the lack of identity, the incessant smothering, the manipulation, and the blurred line between selflessness and selfishness".

== Related films ==
=== Searching (2018) ===
In November 2018, Ohanian revealed that Run includes intentional references to his previous film Searching, while also stating that the latter has connections to the prior as well. Later in November 2020, Chaganty and Ohanian revealed that one of these connections involves a brief appearance by the character of Hannah Pardy from Searching as a stock photo model. The filmmaking duo stated that the references between their movies establish that they take place within the same fictional continuity.

=== Missing (2023) ===
In November 2022, Ohanian revealed that during the events of Missing, connections to Run will be explored, including revealing what happened to its main characters. The filmmaker referred to the plot-thread as an epilogue to cliffhanger ending.

During Missing, a news broadcast contains a scrolling ticker at 58 minute and 53 second hints that Diane has escaped the correctional facility.

== See also ==
- Munchausen syndrome by proxy
- Gypsy Rose case
