= Sarah Paulson =

American actress (born 1974)

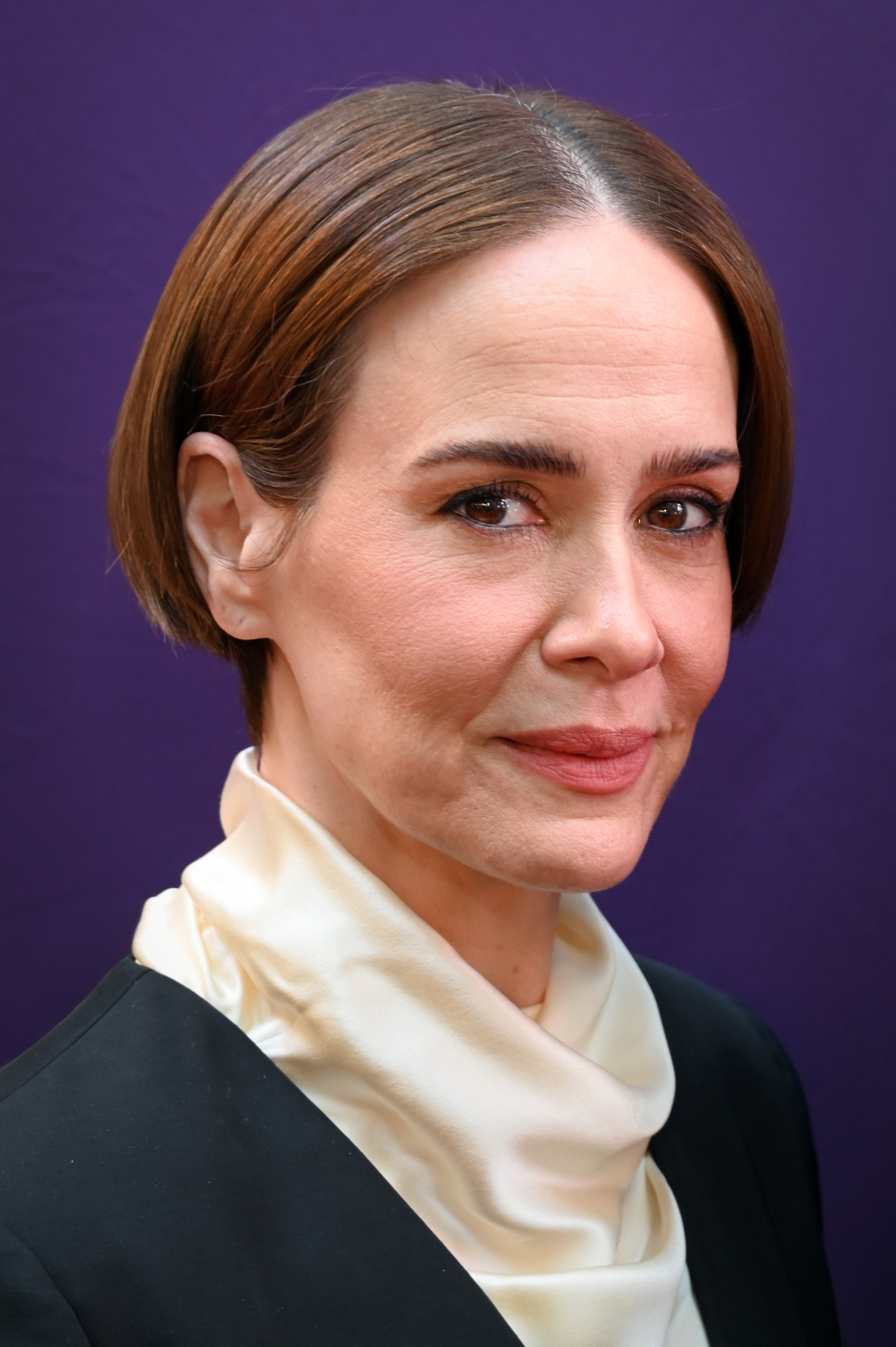
- Paulson in 2026
- Born: December 17, 1974 (age 51); Tampa, Florida, U.S.
- Occupation: Actress
- Years active: 1994–present
- Works: Full list
- Partner: Holland Taylor (2015–present)
- Awards: Full list

Sarah Catharine Paulson (born December 17, 1974) is an American actress. Known for her performances on stage and screen, she has received numerous accolades, including an Actor Award, a Golden Globe Award, a Primetime Emmy Award, and a Tony Award.

Paulson began her acting career starring in the television series American Gothic (1995–1996) and Jack & Jill (1999–2001). She played Harriet Hayes in the NBC drama series Studio 60 on the Sunset Strip (2006–2007). Paulson gained fame for her collaborations with showrunner Ryan Murphy, notably starring in ten seasons of his anthology series American Horror Story from 2011 to 2026.

She is also known for her portrayal of Marcia Clark in the FX limited series The People v. O. J. Simpson: American Crime Story (2016), her roles as Nicolle Wallace in the HBO television film Game Change (2012) and Linda Tripp in the FX miniseries Impeachment: American Crime Story (2021). She has also played a conservative activist in the FX on Hulu limited series Mrs. America (2020) and Nurse Ratched in the Netflix thriller series Ratched (2020).

On film, she has had leading roles in Blue Jay (2016), Glass (2019), Run (2020), and Hold Your Breath (2024), as well as supporting roles in What Women Want (2000), Down with Love (2003), Martha Marcy May Marlene (2011), Mud (2012), 12 Years a Slave (2013), Carol (2015), The Post (2017), Ocean's 8 (2018), and Bird Box (2018). On Broadway, she acted in the Tennessee Williams revival The Glass Menagerie (2005), the Donald Margulies play Collected Stories (2010), and the Branden Jacobs-Jenkins play Appropriate (2023).

== Early life and education ==
Sarah Catharine Paulson was born in Tampa, Florida, on December 17, 1974, the daughter of Catharine Gordon (née Dolcater) and Douglas Lyle Paulson II. She spent her early life in South Tampa until her parents' divorce when she was five. After her parents' separation, she relocated with her mother and sister to Maine, then to New York City. Her mother worked as a waitress, and Paulson lived in Queens and Gramercy Park before settling in Park Slope.

She recalled of this period, "My mom was 27 years old [when we moved]. She didn't know a single person in New York City. She got a job at Sardi's Restaurant." Throughout her childhood, Paulson spent her summers in Florida with her father, who was an executive at a Tampa door manufacturing company. She attended P.S. 29 and Berkeley Carroll School in Brooklyn before attending Manhattan's Fiorello H. LaGuardia High School and the American Academy of Dramatic Arts.

== Career ==
=== 1994–2007: Early roles and career beginnings ===
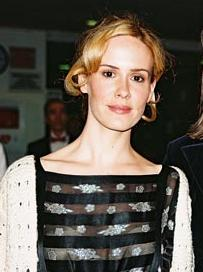
Paulson at the 2006 Drama Desk Awards

Paulson began working as an actress immediately after high school. She made her Broadway debut in 1994 as a replacement understudy for the role of Tessin, played by Amy Ryan in Wendy Wasserstein's play The Sisters Rosensweig at the Ethel Barrymore Theatre. She appeared in the Horton Foote play Talking Pictures at the Signature Theatre, and in an episode of Law & Order in 1994. The next year, Paulson appeared in the Hallmark television film Friends at Last (1995) opposite Kathleen Turner, playing the adult version of Turner's character's daughter. She also starred in the short-lived television series American Gothic (also 1995), playing the ghost of a murdered woman.

In 1997, Paulson made her feature film debut in the independent thriller film Levitation, playing a woman who discovers she is pregnant after an anonymous sexual encounter. Leonard Klady of Variety noted that Paulson and her co-stars are "not supported by the script", concluding: "Levitation is a grim, convoluted saga of identity and belonging. An ill-fitting combination of melodrama and magic realism, the indie effort will have a decidedly difficult time in the theatrical arena." In 1997, Paulson was a featured actress (Janice/Nina) in the two-part episode "True Romance" of Cracker, which starred Robert Pastorelli. In 1998, she returned to the stage acting in the Off-Broadway production of Killer Joe (1998).

In 1999, she played Elisa Cronkite in The WB comedy-drama series Jack & Jill. The same year, she was also cast opposite Juliette Lewis and Diane Keaton in the drama The Other Sister, playing the lesbian sister of a developmentally-disabled woman in San Francisco, and in a supporting part playing a hostage in the comedy Held Up, opposite Jamie Foxx. In 2000, she had a small supporting role in the Nancy Meyers–directed romantic comedy What Women Want, starring Mel Gibson and Helen Hunt.

She portrayed Luci Baines Johnson in the HBO film Path to War (2002) starring Michael Gambon, Donald Sutherland and Alec Baldwin. That same year she starred as the main character, Faith Wardwell, an advertising executive, in the NBC series Leap of Faith (2002). Phil Gallo compared the show unfavorably to Sex and the City. She was then cast in the period romantic comedy Down with Love (2003) in a central supporting role, portraying the friend and editor of a writer (portrayed by Renee Zellweger). Paulson had a minor recurring role in the HBO series Deadwood (2005) and was a focal character in a 2004 episode of the FX series Nip/Tuck.

In 2004, she had a supporting role in the ABC series The D.A., which was cancelled after only four episodes. In the spring of 2005, Paulson starred in a Broadway revival of the Tennessee Williams play The Glass Menagerie opposite co-star Jessica Lange. Ben Brantley of The New York Times deemed the production as "misdirected and miscast ... reality never makes an appearance in this surreally blurred production." Later that year, Paulson appeared Off-Broadway in a production of Colder Than Here, opposite Lily Rabe (also her future co-star on American Horror Story). The production received an unfavorable review from Variety, with critic Dave Rooney writing: "Rabe speaks in an affected monotone while Sarah Paulson has the measured, upward-inflected delivery of a children's TV presenter ... this mannered, melancholy play elicits a mainly impassive response, which is no small obstruction in a work dealing with loss."

Also in 2005, Paulson had a small role in the Joss Whedon-directed science fiction film Serenity. In the 2006–07 television season, Paulson co-starred in the Aaron Sorkin created NBC comedy-drama Studio 60 on the Sunset Strip, playing Harriet Hayes, one of the stars of the show-within-a-show. This role earned her a nomination for Golden Globe Award for Best Supporting Actress – Series, Miniseries or Television Film. In December 2008, Paulson appeared in the screen adaptation of Will Eisner's comic book The Spirit, playing an updated version of the character Ellen Dolan.

=== 2008–2015: Breakthrough and critical acclaim ===
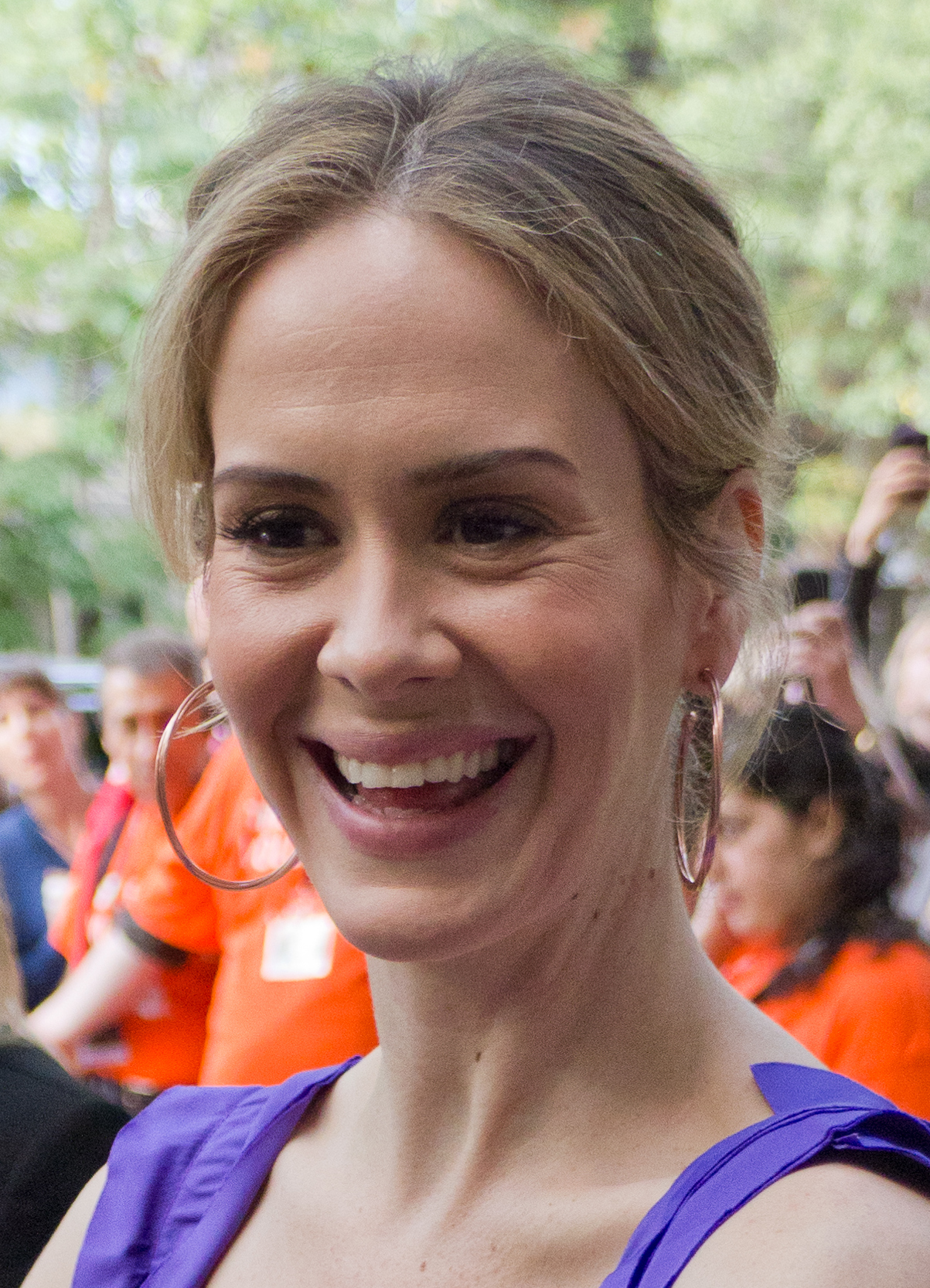
Paulson at the 2011 Toronto International Film Festival

In 2008, ABC cast Paulson in the pilot Cupid, which was ordered to series. It was a remake of the 1998 series starring Jeremy Piven and Paula Marshall. In the new version, Paulson starred opposite Bobby Cannavale. It debuted in late March 2009 on ABC but was cancelled on May 19, 2009, after six episodes. In February 2010, Paulson was cast as the circa 1982 mother of main character Meredith Grey, on the ABC drama Grey's Anatomy, appearing in a flashback sequence in a season-six episode. She then played Nicolle Wallace in the HBO film Game Change (2012), based on events of the 2008 U.S. presidential election campaign. For her performance, she earned Primetime Emmy Award and Golden Globe Award nominations.

In the spring of 2010, she starred in the Donald Margulies play Collected Stories alongside Linda Lavin at the Samuel J. Friedman Theatre on Broadway. The same year, Paulson filmed the independent drama Martha Marcy May Marlene, in which she starred opposite Elizabeth Olsen and Hugh Dancy, portraying the wealthy sister of a woman who has escaped a cult. The film was released in the fall of 2011. Simultaneously, Paulson guest-starred in three episodes of the FX anthology series American Horror Story, playing medium Billie Dean Howard.

In 2012, Paulson returned for season two, American Horror Story: Asylum, in which she played a new character, Lana Winters, a writer who is committed to an asylum for being a lesbian. For her performance she was nominated for the Primetime Emmy Award for Outstanding Supporting Actress in a Limited Series or Movie at the 65th Primetime Emmy Awards. During this time, she also played the supporting role of Mary Lee in the acclaimed Jeff Nichols drama film Mud (2012), starring Matthew McConaughey.

Paulson returned to theater in March 2013, appearing in an Off-Broadway production of the Lanford Wilson play Talley's Folly opposite Danny Burstein. She then starred in the third season of American Horror Story, titled Coven (2013) as Cordelia Foxx, a witch who runs an academy for other young witches. The same year, she starred as Mary Epps, an abusive slave-owner, in the Steve McQueen directed historical drama film 12 Years a Slave. The film was a critical success, earning numerous accolades. She was nominated along with the ensemble for the Screen Actors Guild Award for Outstanding Performance by a Cast in a Motion Picture.

In 2014, Paulson appeared in the fourth season of series of American Horror Story, titled Freak Show, playing the roles of conjoined twin sisters Bette and Dot Tattler, who are members of a circus freak show. She returned for the fifth season, subtitled Hotel, in the role of Hypodermic Sally, the ghost of a drug addict trapped in a Hollywood hotel. For her roles in Freak Show and Hotel she received nominations for the Primetime Emmy Award for Outstanding Supporting Actress in a Limited or Anthology Series or Movie in 2014 and 2016. She also reprised the character of Billie Dean Howard in the last episode of the season, making a crossover appearance. During this time, Paulson also took on the role of Abby Gerhard in the Todd Haynes-directed romantic drama Carol (2015), a period piece in which she played the supporting role of Cate Blanchett's close friend.

=== 2016–present: Career expansion and return to Broadway ===
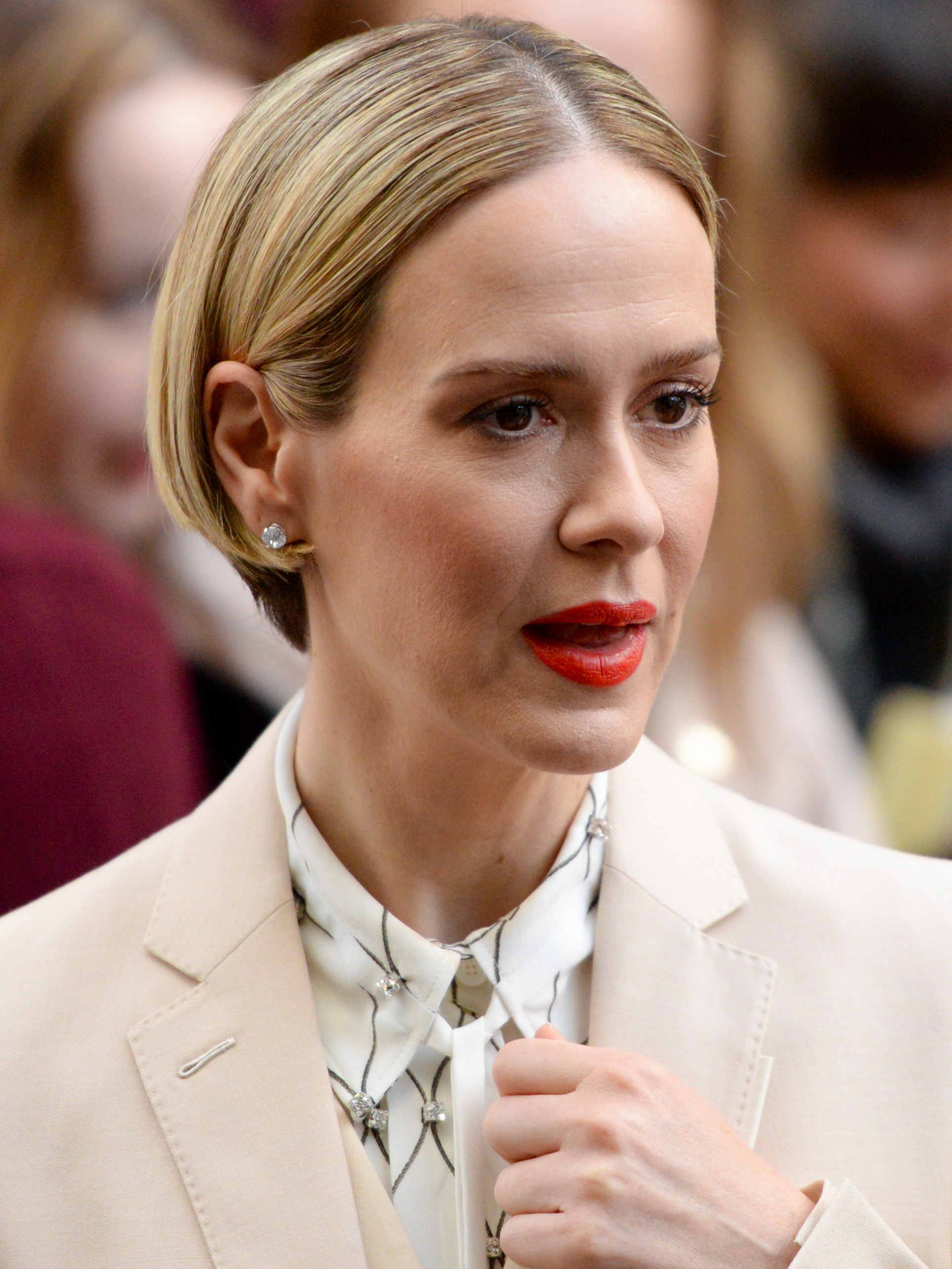
Paulson at the 2019 Toronto International Film Festival

Beginning in February 2016, Paulson starred in the first season of the true crime anthology series American Crime Story, subtitled The People v. O.J. Simpson, portraying prosecutor Marcia Clark. Maureen Ryan of Variety wrote, "Marcia Clark's summation was clipped, precise and underlined by the simmering, quietly controlled anger that Sarah Paulson brought to the role. She was framed with geometric precision and squared edges." She garnered widespread critical acclaim for her performance and won numerous awards, the Primetime Emmy Award for Outstanding Lead Actress in a Limited Series or Movie as well as the Screen Actors Guild Award, Golden Globe Award, Critics' Choice Television Award, and TCA Award for the role.

In September 2016, she starred opposite Mark Duplass in Netflix romantic drama Blue Jay (2016) which premiered at the Toronto International Film Festival. Jon Frosch of The Hollywood Reporter wrote of her performance, "If the film proves more stirring than you expect, it’s thanks to Paulson, who, with her crisp delivery and teasing eyes welling up with confusion and heartache, gives Amanda an inner life far beyond what's written for her."

In June 2016, the Human Rights Campaign released a video in tribute to the victims of the Orlando nightclub shooting; in the video, Paulson and others told the stories of the people killed there. In the fall of 2016, she starred in the sixth iteration of American Horror Story, subtitled Roanoke; in it, she was cast in the dual roles of British actress Audrey Tindall and tortured wife and yoga instructor Shelby Miller, the latter of whom is portrayed by Tindall's character in My Roanoke Nightmare, a documentary within the series. She also reprised her role of Lana Winters in the final episode of Roanoke, in which the character makes a crossover appearance.

After completing Roanoke, Paulson appeared in the series' seventh season, Cult (2017), in which she played restaurant owner Ally Mayfair-Richards, and Susan Atkins in the 10th episode of the season. She starred as Geraldine Page in one episode of the first season of drama anthology series Feud (2017), which chronicles the turbulent working relationship between actresses Bette Davis and Joan Crawford.

Paulson was then cast in the heist film Ocean's 8 (2018), co-starring with Cate Blanchett, Sandra Bullock, Anne Hathaway, Mindy Kaling, Awkwafina, and Rihanna. The film was a commercial success, grossing nearly $300 million at the worldwide box office. In 2017, she was invited to join the Academy of Motion Picture Arts and Sciences and named by Time as one of the 100 most influential people in the world. In 2018, Paulson was ranked one of the best dressed women by fashion website Net-a-Porter. Paulson returned for the eighth season of American Horror Story, titled Apocalypse, which premiered on September 12, 2018. In Apocalypse, Paulson reprised both the Murder House and Coven roles of Billie Dean Howard and Cordelia Foxx, respectively, and also starred as the villainous Miss Wilhemina Venable. In addition to appearing as three characters, Paulson also directed one of the season's episodes, marking her directorial debut. She played Sandra Bullock's character's sister, Jessica, in the drama horror film Bird Box (2018), which was released on Netflix in December.

In 2019, Paulson starred as Dr. Ellie Staple in the superhero thriller film Glass, Xandra in the drama film The Goldfinch, and Dr. Zara in the animated adventure film Abominable. Paulson then starred as Alice Macray in the FX limited drama series Mrs. America (2020) about the unsuccessful political movement to pass the Equal Rights Amendment. Paulson acted opposite Cate Blanchett, Rose Byrne, Uzo Aduba, Melanie Lynskey and Margo Martindale. She also starred as Clarissa Montgomery in the HBO satirical comedy television film Coastal Elites, which premiered in September 2020.

In September 2017, it was announced that Paulson would star as a younger version of Nurse Mildred Ratched, the villain of the novel One Flew Over the Cuckoo's Nest and its acclaimed 1975 film adaptation, in the Netflix drama series Ratched, a prequel to the novel which would portray the character's origins. The first season was released on September 18, 2020. For her performance she was nominated for the Golden Globe Award for Best Actress – Television Series Drama. In November 2020, Paulson starred in the psychological thriller film Run, opposite Kiera Allen. It became the most watched original film on the streaming platform Hulu.

In 2021, she portrayed Linda Tripp in the third season of the true crime anthology series American Crime Story, subtitled Impeachment. For her performance in the series, Paulson received a Primetime Emmy Award nomination. In 2021, she returned to American Horror Story for its tenth season, after being absent for the ninth season. She portrayed the character Tuberculosis Karen and a fictional version of former First Lady of the United States, Mamie Eisenhower.

In February 2022, it was announced that Paulson had been tapped to portray author Glennon Doyle in a television series based on Doyle's memoir, Untamed. In 2023, she guest-starred in the Hulu comedy drama series The Bear, playing Michelle Berzatto in the episode "Fishes". Paulson returned to Broadway in 2023 to star in Branden Jacobs-Jenkins's play Appropriate acting alongside Corey Stoll, Natalie Gold, Elle Fanning, and Michael Esper. In the play she portrays Toni, the eldest sibling who tries to reconnect with her siblings after the death of their late father. While at their father's home in rural Arkansas they all discover his shocking past. Adrian Horton of The Guardian declared that Paulson was "the top reason among many to see this play" adding, "Part of the play's delight is relishing Paulson's delivery of some truly scathing burns". Paulson won the Tony Award for Best Actress in a Play.

== Personal life ==
Paulson lives in Los Angeles. She is a supporter of the Democratic Party. She was diagnosed with melanoma on her back when she was 25, and the growth was removed before the cancer could spread.

Addressing her sexuality, Paulson called it "a fluid situation" and later said, "If my life choices had to be predicated based on what was expected of me from a community on either side, that's going to make me feel really straitjacketed, and I don't want to feel that." She dated actress Cherry Jones from 2004 to 2009. She had dated only men before this relationship, including her former fiancé, playwright Tracy Letts.

In March 2016, Paulson confirmed during an interview that she had been dating actress Holland Taylor since early 2015, after the two had met at a dinner party approximately in 2006.
