= Kiera Allen =

American actress

- Born: December 29, 1997 (age 28); New York City, U.S.
- Education: Columbia University (BA)
- Occupation: Actress
- Years active: 2014–present

Kiera Allen (born December 29, 1997) is an American actress known for her role in the Hulu thriller Run.

== Personal life ==
Allen was raised in New York. She was a Creative Writing student at Columbia University in the class of 2022. She uses a wheelchair for mobility.

== Career ==
In 2014, Allen appeared in the short film Ethan & Skye. She featured in Bekah Brunstetter's off-Broadway show Girl #2 in 2017. She made her film debut in the 2020 thriller Run with Sarah Paulson, which became the most-watched original film on Hulu. She is the second female wheelchair-using actress to star in a suspense film, following Susan Peters doing the same in 1948.

== Filmography ==
Year	Title	Role	Notes	Ref(s).
2014	Ethan & Skye		Short film	
2017	Girl #2		Theatre play; directed by Bekah Brunstetter	
2020	Run	Chloe	Film; main role	
2022	The Good Doctor	Steph	1 episode	
2025	Watson	Gigi Grigoryan	3 episodes	
