= Homebase (disambiguation) =

Homebase was a British home improvement and garden centre retailer.

Home base or Homebase may also refer to:

- Homebase (brand), the successor version of the British home improvement and garden centre retailer, operating the brand as a website and as an in-store concession
- HomeBase, defunct US home improvement store
- Homebase (album), a 1991 album by DJ Jazzy Jeff and the Fresh Prince
- Homebase (novel), a 1979 novel by Shawn Wong
- Homebase (software company), an American software company based in San Francisco, California
- Home Base, an alternate name for Area 51, a military base located in Nevada, U.S.
- An alternate name for home plate in baseball
