= Lisa Onodera =

American film producer

Lisa Onodera is an American independent film producer, of such noted films as Picture Bride, The Debut and Americanese. She grew up in Berkeley, California, and attended UCLA where she received a degree from the School of Motion Picture and Television.

Early film credits include serving as Associate Producer on Arthur Dong's documentary, Forbidden City, USA and the Frontline documentary, The Monster That Ate Hollywood.

Onodera produced the 1995 Sundance Film Festival Audience Award winner, Picture Bride, directed by Kayo Hatta, starring Youki Kudoh, Akira Takayama, Tamlyn Tomita, and Toshirō Mifune. The film, considered a landmark Asian American work, also received an Independent Spirit Award nomination for Best First Feature, and was released by Miramax Films.

From 1997 to 2002, Onodera ran the production company, Celestial Pictures, with producer Peter Shiao. The company developed a number of Asian American projects, and co-financed and co-produced Jule Gilfillan's Restless, a romantic drama set and shot in Beijing, China.

In 2000, she produced Gene Cajayon's Filipino American feature, The Debut, starring Dante Basco, which won the Audience Award at the Hawaii International Film Festival and Best Feature at the San Diego Asian Film Festival. The film also received an AMMY Award for Best Independent Feature, and a MANAA Media Achievement Award, while breaking indie distribution records with a $2 million box office return during its theatrical release in 2003.

In 2003, Onodera produced the Emmy nominated half-hour PBS television special, Day of Independence for Cedar Grove Productions, which told the story of a young Nisei (second-generation Japanese American) baseball player facing the Japanese American internment during World War II. In 2006, she produced Eric Byler's TRE and Emily Skopov's Novel Romance.

In 2006, IFC Films released Americanese, an adaptation of Shawn Wong's Asian American novel, American Knees, which Onodera optioned in 1995, the year the book was first published. Written for the screen and directed by Eric Byler, and produced by Onodera, the film made its world premiere at the South by Southwest Film Festival (SXSW), winning the SXSW Audience Award for Best Narrative Feature and a Special Jury Prize for Outstanding Ensemble Cast.
