= Charlotte Sometimes =

Charlotte Sometimes may refer to:

- Charlotte Sometimes (novel), a 1969 children's book by Penelope Farmer
- "Charlotte Sometimes" (song), a 1981 song by The Cure, based on the book
- Charlotte Sometimes (film), a 2002 independent film by Eric Byler, not related to the novel but title taken from the song
- Charlotte Sometimes (musician), from 2008 to 2014 stage name of singer-songwriter Jessica Poland, taken from the book
