= Yeiko Mizobe So =

Yeiko Mizobe So (December 4, 1867 – August 13, 1932) was the founder of the Japanese Women’s Home in Honolulu. The organization was a shelter for Japanese picture brides fleeing abuse.

== Early life ==
So was born Yeiko Mizobe in Fukuoka, Japan on December 4, 1867. She was born into a samurai family. She married Isojiro So in 1888, but he of an illness died six months later. Soon after Isojiro's death, So converted to Christianity after meeting Orramel Hinckley Gulick and his wife, who were from Hawaii. So decided not to remarry and entered the Kobe Women's Seminary. She graduated in April 1893.

== Hawaii ==
The Gulicks were called to return to Hawaii in 1894, and suggested to the Hawaii Board of Missions that they should invite a missionary from Japan to serve the growing Japanese community. The Board of Missions invited So in 1895, and she arrived in Honolulu on May 20, 1895.

After touring the islands, So founded the Japanese Women's Home in the same year. Its purpose was to help Japanese women who ran away from domestic violence and forced prostitution. Prostitution was more profitable than work at the sugar plantations, so many women were forced into prostitution by their husbands. The women living in the shelter cooked, cleaned, and maintained it. There was also a nursery and playground for children who came to the shelter with their mothers. The shelter also offered job training and classes. After leaving the shelter, So and her staff would call on women at home to make sure that they were doing well and offer support. The shelter served over 700 women during its 10 years of operation. It closed when the Territorial Immigration Center took over supporting abused picture brides.

In 1905, So founded the Home for Neglected Children, which was funded by the Nuuanu Congregational Church. The home served more than 350 children. So adopted her daughter, Esther, from the shelter.

So retired in 1931, and died at Queens Hospital on August 13, 1932.
