= Charlotte Sometimes (film) =

- Directed by: Eric Byler
- Written by: Eric Byler
- Produced by: Eric Byler; Marc Ambrose
- Starring: Michael Idemoto; Eugenia Yuan; Matt Westmore; Jacqueline Kim
- Cinematography: Rob Humphreys
- Edited by: Eric Byler; Kenn Kashima; Tom Moore
- Music by: Michael Brook
- Production company: Visionbox Pictures
- Distributed by: Visionbox Pictures
- Release dates: March 11, 2002 (SXSW); May 2, 2003 (United States)
- Running time: 85 minutes
- Country: United States
- Languages: English; Japanese; Chinese
- Budget: $21,000 (estimated)
- Box office: $247,554

Charlotte Sometimes is a 2002 drama film written, directed, and produced by Eric Byler. The title is taken from the song Charlotte Sometimes by The Cure, which in turn is based on the book Charlotte Sometimes by Penelope Farmer.

== Plot ==
Michael is an introverted, Japanese-American auto mechanic who lives in a Los Angeles duplex, whose other half he leases out to Lori. The Chinese-American Lori becomes good friends with Michael and there is somewhat of an air of sexual tension between them, but Michael, aware that Lori has a live-in boyfriend, Justin, doesn't cross their line of friendship. When the enigmatic drifter Darcy comes into Michael's life, the dynamics between him, Lori, and Justin are complicated and Michael must make a decision between his head and heart.

== Cast ==
- Michael Idemoto as Michael
- Eugenia Yuan as Lori
- Matt Westmore as Justin
- Jacqueline Kim as Darcy/Charlotte
- Kimberly-Rose Wolter as Kakela
- Shizuko Hoshi as Aunt

== Music ==
Cody ChesnuTT appears as himself in the film, performing on stage, and several of his songs are featured in the soundtrack.

The film score was written by composer Michael Brook, who was also the film score composer for An Inconvenient Truth. Brook also scored Eric Byler's films Tre, Americanese, and 9500 Liberty.

== Reception ==
On review aggregate website Rotten Tomatoes, Charlotte Sometimes has an approval rating of 81% based on 43 reviews. The site's critic consensus reads, "Featuring an attractive young cast, Charlotte mostly shines as a portrait of the sexual frolics and hangups of L.A. Asian twentysomethings." On Metacritic, the film has a score of 72 based on 16 reviews, indicating a "generally favorable" reception.

Roger Ebert praised the film and awarded it 3 and ½ out of 4 stars. Ebert wrote the film "drew me in from the opening shots. Byler reveals his characters in a way that intrigues and even fascinates us, and he never reduces the situation to simple melodrama, which would release the tension. This is like a psychological thriller, in which the climax has to do with feelings, not actions." Of Kim, Ebert wrote she "brings a quality to Darcy that is intriguing and unsettling at the same time." He added, "Idemoto brings such a loneliness to his role, such a feeling of the character's long hours of solitary thought, that we care for him right from the start and feel his pain about this woman who might be the right one for him but remains elusive and hidden."

The New York Times called Charlotte Sometimes, "A tiny film that reflects a large talent."

Carla Meyer of the San Francisco Chronicle wrote, "Most romances about smart, stylish young people like these would force them into quip-a-minute mode, fearful that audiences weaned on Friends won't accept a simple, unhurried love story. But Charlotte's characters are allowed depth and self-awareness, even when they do the foolish things young people do, like rush into relationships with strangers."

Desson Thomson of The Washington Post also reviewed the film positively, writing "It's a smartly made, hedonistic spectacle of alluring, nubile characters, sun-warmed narcissism and breathtaking color." Thomson added "the film amounts to an inner chess game (or Go game) among lovers or would-be lovers. It's governed by the impulsive urges of the heart and all the attendant feelings, confessions, lies and deceptions."

Marjorie Baumgarten of the Austin Chronicle was more mixed in her review and critical of the story, but praised the camerawork and noted the four main characters all being Asian-Americans "provides another layer of meaning for Charlotte Sometimes as the film intrinsically shows us, although without ever overtly commenting on it, some of the unique inter- and intra-cultural ramifications of the Asian-American dating scene."

== Awards and nominations ==
- 2002 SXSW Film Festival, Audience Award - won
- San Diego Asian Film Festival, Best Picture - won
- Florida International Film Festival, Special Jury Prize - won
- 2003 Independent Spirit Awards
  - John Cassavetes Award (Best First Feature under $500,000) - nominee
  - Best Supporting Female, Jacqueline Kim - nominee

== Home media ==
Charlotte Sometimes was released on DVD by Hart Sharp Video on September 30, 2003. Among the DVD's bonus features is a 2003 Q&A with Byler, executive producer John Bard Manulis, and cast members Idemoto and Kim moderated by Roger Ebert from his Overlooked Film Festival.
