= Blu's Hanging =

1997 novel by Lois-Ann Yamanaka

- Cover of the Farrar, Straus and Giroux 1997 hardcover edition
- Author: Lois-Ann Yamanaka
- Language: English
- Genre: Novel
- Publisher: Harper Perennial
- Publication date: 1997
- Publication place: United States
- Media type: Print (hardback & paperback)
- Pages: 262
- ISBN: 0-380-73139-8
- Preceded by: Wild Meat and the Bully Burgers, Saturday Night at the Pahala Theater
- Followed by: Heads By Harry

Blu's Hanging is a 1997 coming-of-age novel by Lois-Ann Yamanaka. It follows the Ogata family after the death of their mother, as each family member struggles to come to terms with their grief. The story is told through Ivah, a smart-mouthed thirteen-year-old who is left as the oldest child to take care of her younger siblings, Blu and Maisie, while she struggles with her own grief, emerging sexuality, and awareness of the world. Similar to Yamanaka's other works, Blu's Hanging, encompasses the topics of racial politics and the diverse culture of Hawaii, as well as the coming of age of the main character amongst various sexual threats and questions.

Following its publication, it was awarded the literature prize by the Association for Asian American Studies (AAAS), which was later revoked on the grounds that her portrayals of certain minorities were racist.

== Plot summary ==
Blu's Hanging is a novel which introduces the very distressed life of the Ogata family. Sisters Ivah, Blu, and Maisie struggle to deal with life and the issues that ensue as a result of the death of their mother, Eleanor. Their father, Poppy, struggles to parent them, barely making ends meet and not knowing how to care for his children after losing his wife. Ivah is left to fulfill the maternal role to her two younger siblings and is held to unrealistic expectations by her father.

Even though Eleanor has died, her presence among the family remains. This has both positive and negative effects on the family. The Ogata's struggle to move on, specifically Poppy, who cannot come to grips with her death. He constantly speaks of Eleanor, with frequent references to Moon River. He becomes hardened and cold to his children as he struggles to grieve. The children are also deeply affected by Eleanor's seemingly constant presence within the family. As they still look to her for guidance and support in dealing with their issues, they are able to rely on her when in pain yet battle with being able to move on.

Because of the fractured state their family is in, their wounded unit is easily torn apart by outer societal influences. Due to the lack of parenting, each child struggles to cope in unique ways. They are treated harshly by Poppy and are neglected of any true care or concern. As he is depressed himself, he turns to drugs bringing the family to a more desperate state, economically and emotionally. Certain events begin to unfold and proper judgment on behalf of the children is not used. They find themselves teetering with very dangerous situations to which Eleanor would've never approved of. As a result, Uncle Paulo, a neighbor of the family, rapes Blu, weakening the already fragile state of the Ogatas.

Poppy, left feeling beside himself, blames Ivah for her abandonment of her younger siblings as she attempted to cross her first stepping stone to independence (i.e. going away to school). As the children have no real support system, and they are constantly combated with troublesome circumstances including racial angst and violence, they are left to feel like orphans as their place in society seems to diminish even further.

Ultimately; Ivah, Blu and Maisie, who are still very attached to the presence of Eleanor, are able somewhat move on through the letting go of their dog, Ka-san. Poppy, still unable to cope with the loss of his wife, leaves as well. Although the children are conclusively alone, it seems as a small glimmer of hope in allowing them to reform as individuals

== Characters ==
=== Major characters ===
Ivah Harriet Ogata

Ivah is the narrator and protagonist of Blu's Hanging – we see the novel entirely through her perspective. Ivah is the oldest of Bertram's three children and acts as a protector and caretaker of Blu and Maisie after their mother dies. Blu's Hanging acts as a coming of age narrative for Ivah, where she transforms into a maternal figure.

Bertram Ogata (Poppy)

"Poppy" is the narrator's father. He and his wife, Eleanor, have three children: Ivah, Blu, and Maisie. His wife dies just before the beginning of the novel, but he has not assumed the primary caretaker role of the family. He works several jobs, but his family lives in poverty. Poppy is sometimes rude and abrasive and Ivah often has to take care of him. He lives with leprosy like his wife did.

Presley Vernon Ogata (Blu)

The middle child, Blu has very few friends. At school, the kids make fun of him for his paper bag lunches. Blu is overweight for his age and he often eats gluttonously. He makes friends with a boy named Ed and he is infatuated with the Reyes sisters who live next door, but his sisters Ivah and Maisie are his best friends.

Maisie Tsuneko Ogata

The youngest of the Ogata children, Maisie is in Kindergarten. In Kindergarten, Maisie wets her pants daily and is eventually placed into Special Education, where Miss Ito helps her speak. Although she is a predominantly silent character, Maisie lends insight into the spirit of her mother.

=== Minor characters ===
Eleanor Ogata (Mama)

The mother of the Ogata children, Eleanor dies a few months before the novel begins, but she is mentioned frequently. We later find out that she died from the treatment she used for her leprosy. Ivah often reflects on her mother's absence.

Mr. Iwasaki

Mr. Iwasaki is an old Japanese man who lives on the way to the Friendly Market. He exposes himself to passers-by. He exposed himself to Ivah's mother and later to Blu as Blu and Maisie were walking by.

Uncle Paulo

The Reyes girls' uncle, Uncle Paulo is a 20-year-old Filipino male. He is a sexual predator who molests his under-aged nieces and eventually Blu.

Henrilyn Reyes

Henrilyn is one of the younger Reyes girls who live next door to the Ogatas.

Trixi Reyes

Trixi is one of the Younger Reyes girls who live next door to the Ogatas. She enjoys playing with the canary at home and she is afraid of her Uncle Paulo who threatens to rape her.

Blendaline Reyes

Blendaline, nicknamed "Blendie," is one of the Ogata's neighbors. She is Blu's first girlfriend and they are sexually intimate with each other.

Evangeline Reyes

Evangeline, nicknamed "Vangie", is Ivah's age. She starts dating Mitchell, the boy Ivah has a crush on, and the two of them have sex.

Ka-San

Ka-San is Maisie's dog, named after "O-kasan", which Eleanor Ogata used to play for her children to make them feel spoiled. Maisie says that the dog is Mama.

Hoppy Creetat

Hoppy is the Ogata's cat. She gives birth to four kittens: Miss Anna, Fortune Cookie, Morris the Cat, and Kingdom Come.

Miss Tammy Owens

Miss Owens is Maisie's Kindergarten teacher who discourages Maisie and sends her to Special Education for her lack of communication skills.

Betty Fukuda

Aunty Betty is Bertram's sister and aunt of the three Ogata children. Flies all four Ogata's to her house in Hilo for Thanksgiving. She continually brags about her daughter, Lila Beth.

Myron Fukuda

Uncle Myron is Aunt Betty's husband. He is a teacher.

Ed the Big Head Endo

Ed is one of Blu's only friends in the novel. Ivah doesn't care for him because she thinks he takes advantage of Blu's spending money. Blu always buys Pepsi and barbecue chips with Ed, so they call themselves "Pep and Bob." Blu is Pep; Ed is Bob.

Lila Beth Fukuda

Lila is Betty and Myron's daughter who is a senior in high school. She always smells like strawberry musk and wears low-cut tops and low-rise jeans.

Faith Ann Fukuda (Big Sis)

Big Sis is Betty and Myron's elder daughter who is also the oldest cousin of the Ogata's. She is entering her last year of college at Hilo College and goes on to live with Miss Ito as a teacher. She is less feminine than her younger sister Lila.

Mitchell

Mitchell has been Ivah's Portuguese friend since he moved to Kaunakakai from El Segundo. Ivah has a crush on him and thinks of him differently than the other boys. He dates Evangeline and Ivah is his only "friend-friend." He later becomes a Born Again Christian and cleanses himself of his sexual encounters with Evangeline.

Miss Sandra Ito

Miss Ito, or Sandie, is Maisie's Special Ed teacher. She helps Maisie improve her communication skills tremendously. She invites the Ogata children over for dinner and a sleepover for Maisie's birthday.

Mrs. Nishimoto

Mrs. Nishimoto is a schoolteacher from Bloomingdale, Ohio who hires Blu and Ivah to iron shirts for her. She has many children herself, and it is at Mrs. Nishimoto's house where Ivah demonstrates her true motherly qualities by taking charge when the mother herself is overwhelmed.

Mrs. Ikeda (Icky)

Mrs. Ikeda, also referred to as "Icky," hires the Ogata children to take care of her dogs.

Jim Cameron

Jim Cameron is the Baptist church's summer missionary.

== Major Themes & Motifs ==
The major themes and motifs of Blu's Hanging are centered around Ivah and her family members' adjustment and coming to terms with the death of their mother. Through the various themes and motifs, the reader sees how various characters process and accept grief, and the troubles and issues which confront them along the way.

Grief: From the very first chapter of the novel, the reader encounters the Ogatas in their moment of deepest and most unconstrained grief. This feeling encompasses the entire book. Poppy's sadness is translated through his repeated singings of "Moon River", whose whimsical lyrics take on a haunting and troublesome edge when Ivah confesses that "I know where he wants to go," and "And who the dreammaker is". Her brother Blu eats to control his grief, "eating away all the sadness until he's so full that he feels numb and sleepy". Finally, her sister Maisie, turns inward. As a young child, her expression of grief is more physical. The fear and insecurity she feels after her mother's death is demonstrated through her refusal to say more than a handful of words and in the frequency which she wets her panties.

Cats: Perhaps the most pervasive of motifs throughout the book is the reoccurring appearance of cats. Ivah's mother teaches her before she dies that "Black cats cure sadness. Calico cats bring good luck." Although the Ogatas adopt a calico-colored cat, Hoppy Creetat, Ivah continuously waits for a black cat to come to her family, to leach away the grief and sadness which has settled over her family, especially her father, following her mother's death. Another focus of the novel, is the treatment of these cats in the Ogata's neighborhood. The Ogata's neighbors, the Reyes, are deemed cat haters or human rats. They seem to derive pleasure from torturing and killing neighborhood cats in various cruel ways. Their torment is especially significant after they hang the newborn kittens from Hoppy Creetat's litter. In many ways, killing Ivah's hope for a black cat to release her family from sadness. Although the book mainly focuses on cats, dogs too play a significant role. Both Ivah and Maisie seem to believe that their adopted black dog, Ka-san, is an embodiment of their mother. Ka-san protects and provides comfort to the Ogata family members, almost in the way that the mythical black cat would. The Ogata children try to understand and find answers to their grief through the various animals which they encounter. While Hoppy Creetat and Ka-san bring them a measure of comfort and perhaps understanding of their mother, other animals such as the dogs kept by Mrs. Ikeda help them to process another kind of sadness and through the sadness, true happiness. Blu composes cartoons and sayings regarding what happiness is. "Happiness Is Gunther, Chloe, and Simon after they groom and bathe and stay in the house for on hour of love and play with their friends. When dogs happy, they dream. I seen my dog dreaming she was chasing a rabbit in her sleep. I love dogs." Finally, cats and dogs are used to seek revenge upon Uncle Paulo, a "human rat" and child molester. Maisie smears cat and dog feces over his wall at the end, leaving marks which he cannot wash off. Not only do the animals in Blu's Hanging embody specific characters' spirits, they are representative of entire spiritual belief.

Consumption and food: Throughout most cultures of the world, food almost always has some relation to grief and death. The very novel, begins with a description of the bread which the Ogatas eat in their initial mourning period. Like many other cultures, the Ogatas are lavished with food following the death of a loved one, however, this supply quickly dwindles and Ivah must learn how to cook for her family. Her descriptions of the food which she learns to cook represent an understanding of the cultural and racial heritage of the Hawaiian islands and the Ogatas. Many of their meals are a mixture of more traditional Japanese elements such as rice with Hawaiian staples like Spam and American concepts and brands. Although the meals are often cheap and quick fixes, they provide the reader with an understanding of the Ogatas' unique place in the world. Their very lack of food comes to represent the family's breakdown and their attempts to bring back a semblance of normality. The most significant example of consumption throughout the book is undoubtedly Blu. As the book progresses, Blu continues to grow in size as he eats his feelings. One of his most frequent snacks is "mayonnaise bread," which consists of mayonnaise and various spices slathered onto pieces of bread. Like their other meals, this unhealthy snack is a reminder of the Ogata's economic station and mixed heritage of various races and cultures. However, as the novel continues and the children begin to adapt to their grief and lifestyle changes, their meals generally improve. This parallel between food, grief, and life provides examples of how the family works to hold it together. Maisie eventually emerges from her shell, finally speaking in phrases and sentences while reading directions to make a cake. The reader comes to truly understand the family's relation to each other through what they eat.

Coming of age and emerging sexuality:Since the novel is told through the perspective of a thirteen-year-old girl, the reader is not only given a sense of Ivah's coming of age, but of how she interprets the changes in which she sees in the people around her. The book most pointedly discusses the emerging sexuality of Ivah, Blu, the Reyes girls, and Mitchell Oliveira. Although the entire novel is dedicated to Ivah's growth and coming of age, one of the most poignant moments occurs when Ivah first gets her period without the knowledge and support of a mother. At the time Ivah has a crush on Mitchell Oliveira, a neighboring Portuguese boy. Although her crush is dashed, the reader comes to understand the Reyes girls' promiscuity and dark sexual background first through Mitchell's encounters with them. Ivah fears their sexual knowledge, all of which is foreign to her, and she tries her best to protect her brother Blu from them. Unfortunately, as Blue hits puberty and begins to discover his own sexuality through "wana underarms" and "nocturnal emis-shuns", he is continually drawn to the Reyes who can perform sexual favors which make Blu "fly." While the book depicts these first sexual encounters with a certain starkness, the frank tone helps to convey the confusion and fear which Ivah faces in order to come to terms with her own sexuality and that of those around her.

Popular culture:Yamanaka's descriptions are permeated with popular culture references. From the significance of "Moon River" lyrics to cowboy diseases and Clint Eastwood movies to Maisie's favorite song, "The Most Beautiful Girl". The reader understands the Ogata family's life through these references, what is important to them, what is culturally significant and relevant at the time, and how they relate to and understand these cultural items. The very details of their appearance and actions are given meaning through the labels and brands which they wear and use. Uncle Paolo's "Da Sun" with black lace panties hanging from the antenna, identify him as the sexual predator that he is. His car, and what he does in his car comes to embody his character. Perhaps most of all, Yamanaka's cultural references help to make the characters real and relatable in a world that is consumed and controlled by cultural dictates. Even on Molokai, which the book claims to be culturally behind, characters can find movies and songs to escape into, to create fantasies around, just like the rest of America.

Disease and leprosy:Although the book hints at leprosy at several points, Poppy finally lifts the "veil" for Ivah and recounts his and her mother's experience with leprosy, and how this led to her death. Through his retelling of his battle with leprosy and his relationship with his wife, it becomes clear exactly what demons Poppy has faced, and both the physical and invisible scars these battles have left. The very island on which they live, Molokai has a deep relationship with leprosy, as it once functioned as a leper colony where the outcasts of society were sent. In a sense, Ivah's description of Molokai and their neighborhood makes it seem as if Molokai could still very well be a leper colony. Their island is so isolated from the outside world, that Ivah even explains it as their culture being "five years behind Hilo, and Hilo's five years behind Honolulu, and Honolulu's five years behind the mainland. Like her parents, Ivah is also somewhat of an outcast, as she is always prone to catching various illnesses. Her father claims that she always catches "cowboy diseases" such as Hand, Hoof, and Mouth Disease. Although these diseases reflect how the Ogata's live, they also provide a certain identification and nostalgia with the past, both with the Old West and with their mother.

Racial politics of local Hawaiian culture: Although Hawaii in general is a culturally diverse and mixed society, the interactions of these various ethnic people is especially relevant in the Ogata's neighborhood. Yamanaka describes a place in which Japanese and Filipino families mix with the "portagee" and even haole neighbors. These racial distinctions create a certain awareness of class and racial differences. Each ethnicity or minority seems to view the others with distrust or contempt. There is an especially strong dislike between the haole teachers and the more native Japanese teachers, as illustrated by Miss Owens and Miss Ito. Despite the tensions, which this mixture of peoples and cultures creates, the reader comes to understand that this is just one facet of Hawaiian culture and history. Blu's Hanging serves as a critique of these race relations. While Yamanaka has been criticized for her portrayals of different races, the novel does bring to light some of the class and hierarchical issues which do exist.

Hanging: From the book's very title, several instances of hanging or references to hanging are markers of significant events within the novel. As the title might infer, most of these instances are related to Blu. In the very beginning Blu accidentally almost hangs himself, then later there is the incident when the Reyes girls hang Hoppy Creetat's kittens. At one point in the story, Blu and Maisie continually play hangman. While their games are indicative of their close relationship and childlike mindsets, Ivah comments that "Nobody's hanged yet." However, Blu does eventually hang for Maisie, the cartoon stick-figure Blu, of course. At the very end, this motif is brought up again, as Blu tries to hang onto the spirit of their mother following his molestation by Uncle Paulo. Later, Maisie seeks revenge by writing a message on Paulo's wall with the words "MaLeSTeR, HaNG, i KiLL You, HuMaN RaT." The image and use of hanging evokes a sense of struggle which is evident throughout the book. All of the characters struggle with different elements of their life, such as grief, sexuality, school, work, etc. Yet, of all of them, Blu is the most caught up within this struggle, at several points almost literally hanging himself. His personal connections and battles always seem to hang by a thread, and in essence, the novel becomes a study of whether in the end, Blu will hang or hang on.

== Reception and controversy ==
When Lois-Ann Yamanaka's second novel, Blu's Hanging, was released, critics acclaimed that it was "powerful," “arresting," and "brilliant." However, Blu's Hanging quickly became known as a racially controversial work of literature, namely when the Association for Asian American Studies (AAAS) awarded the novel the fiction award, and then revoked it.

The controversy centers around one of the Filipino characters in the novel: Uncle Paulo. Although Uncle Paulo is a minor character in the novel, the fact that he is a Filipino rapist and child molester creates uneasiness in the Asian American community: some “Asian American academics…say the character perpetuates a stereotype of Filipino men as sexual predators." The protests from this group were successful in convincing the AAAS to revoke the awarded fiction award.

Candace Fujikane, one of Yamanaka's critics, supports the AAAS decision to revoke the award, posing the questions: what if the writer were white and Uncle Paulo were black? “I think it would have been easier for people to understand what our concerns are…because she is Japanese, the flat portrayals seems to come from an unawareness of the difficulties that Filipinos have faced.” Fujikane argues that Yamanaka's one-dimensional portrayal of Uncle Paulo as a Filipino male reinforces a system of racism that is already operating.

The revocation of Yamanaka's award generated a whirlwind of protest among other Asian American writers who accused the AAAS of “engaging in censorship in its zeal to strengthen ties among the Asian American ethnic groups." Dozens upon dozens of writers—including Amy Tan and Maxine Hong Kingston—have written letters in support of Yamanaka, but the AAAS refuses to restore the award due to the criticism of the novel's depiction of the Filipino character as being insulting to all Filipinos.

Filipino American poet and novelist Jessica Hagedorn wrote a letter to the AAAS at the pinnacle of the debate claiming, "Yamanaka's detractors seem to be demanding that only writers who create safe, reverent, comforting stories are worthy of acknowledgement." She herself would go on to receive similar criticism for her novel titled Dogeaters, a title declared to be derogatory.

Some authors, including Viet Nguyen and Kandice Chuh, argue that the novel itself and the controversy that has surrounded it illuminates the diversity within Asian America. They suggest that "conflict is not the problem to be fixed, but the unavoidable condition of panethnicity." In her novel, Yamanaka addresses the very phenomenon that has spurred such critical debate: particularities with the panethnic nature of Asian America. Erin Suzuki argues, "As such, what Blu's Hanging, as both a text and a controversy, ultimately represents is the complex moment at which a minority group-in this case, local Asian Americans-begins to reproduce the dominant discourse that has consumed them."

From an author's perspective, Yamanaka expressed concerns about the implications this controversy has on her future as a writer: “‘This has frightened me,’ she says. ‘It’s gotten very personal. The distinction between the narrator and the author is not being made. People are telling me how to write. The critics have crept into my room and are peeping over my shoulder.’”

== See also ==
- Asian American literature
- List of Asian American writers
