= Annie Katsura Rollins =

American artist, scenic designer, and puppeteer

- Born: Minneapolis, Minnesota
- Education: Carnegie Mellon University, University of Minnesota, Concordia University
- Occupations: artist, puppeteer

Annie Katsura Rollins is an American artist, scenic designer, and puppeteer. She specializes in traditional Chinese shadow puppetry.

== Early life and education ==
Rollins grew up in Minneapolis, Minnesota. Her mother is of Chinese and Japanese ancestry. Rollins spent a semester in China during high school. She earned a BFA in music theatre from Carnegie Mellon University in 2002 and earned her MFA in scenography from the University of Minnesota in 2010.

During the summer of 2008, Rollins apprenticed with Master Wei of the Hua Xian Shadow Troupe in Shaanxi province. There she learned techniques of carving and animating figures, publishing a blog about her experiences.

Rollins was awarded a Fulbright Fellowship in 2011 and spent a year in China apprenticing in traditional Chinese shadow puppetry. She had read a 2010 New York Times interview with Chinese shadow puppetry masters Cui and Wang. Rollins visited Cui and Wang's shadow figure museum in Beijing as well as seven provinces that had historically specialized in shadow puppetry. She took lessons in manipulating shadow puppets from the master of the Zhonghua Shadow Company along with many others. While in Beijing, Rollins created and performed two shadow bike tours. She apprenticed with Master Shi of Gansu Province and Master Liu of Tengchong County.

After her return to the United States, Rollins created the full-length work There's Nothing to Tell (没有什么可说) and performed it at the In the Heart of the Beast Puppet and Mask Theatre in Minneapolis. It combines Chinese shadow play with North American style and presents the story of a Chinese grandmaster shadow puppeteer whose life story, spanning the Cultural Revolution through modern times, is told by his granddaughter.

== Career ==
Rollins has worked with the Ballard Institute and Museum of Puppetry, Taiwan's Taiyuan Puppet Company, and the Droomtheatre in the Netherlands. Rollins was artistic director for the Continental Divide Festival's Puppet Pageant for its first two years. She created the set for Carl Flink's dance piece Black Label Movement. Rollins did costume and set design for Ananya Chatterjea's Moreechika: Season of Mirage where her shadow puppets were projected onto the rear wall during performances at The Southern Theater. She also designed puppets for a puppet adaptation of the Harlem Renaissance play The Purple Flower. She has also taught DIY Shadow Puppetry workshops at Open Eye Figure Theatre in Minneapolis and the Center for Puppetry Arts in Atlanta.

During her time in Los Angeles, Rollins had a brief acting career, appearing in the 2006 film Americanese and the series Curb Your Enthusiasm, Big Day, Threshold and the musical short Damn the Past!, among others.

Rollins lives in Montreal where she is pursuing an interdisciplinary PhD in the Humanities at Concordia University. She is the creator of the informational website chineseshadowpuppetry.com.
