= Coffee Party USA =

American political movement

- Formation: January 26, 2010; 16 years ago
- Founder: Annabel Park
- Dissolved: 2021
- Region served: United States
- Website: www.coffeepartyusa.com

The Coffee Party USA was an American political movement that was formed in January 2010 in reaction to the conservative Tea Party movement. Co-founder Annabel Park said that the group initially had significant appeal among those opposed to the Tea Party.

The Coffee Party USA as a formal organization closed in 2021 and assigned assets to Bridge Alliance Education Fund, continuing their social media activity. Once part of the National Coffee Summit of 2010, The Black Coffee Party USA operates a website on google sites, but does not share the same areas of concerns as Coffee Party USA, as its founder Mauricelm-Lei Millere caters strictly to blacks or African Americans

The organization's first National Coffee Party Day was held on March 13, 2010.

== History ==
=== Origins and development ===
The Coffee Party USA was established on January 26, 2010, on the social networking site Facebook. It was founded by documentary filmmakers and political activists Annabel Park and Eric Byler. After becoming increasingly frustrated with the incivility and obstructionism in political discourse, and the media narrative that the Tea Party represented America, Park posted a rant on her Facebook page. Numerous positive responses from friends prompted her to start a "Join the Coffee Party Movement" fan page.

The group rapidly grew to over 155,000 Facebook fans in size from word of mouth and social networking in under six weeks. Newsweek noted the Facebook membership had surpassed 200,000 by April 2010, and every status update was receiving about a million views.

After collecting input from the first round of national gatherings, the Coffee Party outlined three initial steps to promote participatory democracy. "The first step is creating a public space for open and civil dialogue. The second step is collective deliberation, considering facts and values to arrive at a decision. The third step is working toward implementing the decision." Local Coffee Party groups are not yet legally affiliated or authorized to raise funds under the Coffee Party USA name.

In March 2011, the organization announced the dissolution of its interim board, and the establishment of a larger Transition Team charged with creating an organizational infrastructure and a permanent Board."

=== Reception ===
The Coffee Party has been referred to by some in the media as "more academic and centrist than some of its members had hoped for but nevertheless, it is a timely and welcome development of a more intellectual form of political activism"; "a latte-sipping, liberal reaction to the populist conservative Tea Party movement"; "left-leaning"; a group that "welcomes everyone and embraces diversity -- ethnic, geographical and even political diversity"; and "a liberal-esque and pro-Obama answer to the conservative tea party movement" with meetings that are "visibly more diverse than the average tea party gathering."

== Political positions ==
After holding a National Coffee Summit and several votes and polls utilizing internet technology, the Coffee Party determined that the overwhelming concern of its members was money in politics, with "95 percent of members voting for a specific course of action, based on support for the Fair Elections Now Act, the DISCLOSE Act, the Shareholder Protection Act and a constitutional amendment to reverse corporate personhood." As of July 2011, the Coffee Party's stated advocacy goals included "reinstituting campaign finance laws, reforming the tax code and restoring Wall St. oversight."

Additional areas of concern involved issues of environment, clean energy and immigration reform.

== Events ==
=== National Coffee House day 2010 ===
The Coffee Party held its initial National Coffee House day event on March 13, 2010. Some 370 events took place across the US and the world, including Tokyo and Jakarta, with the intent to "encourage our existing and soon-to-form chapters to facilitate informative and civil dialogue about issues that affect all of us, collectively. We will ask them to report back to us on what consensus they reach, and take action from there."

=== National Coffee Summit 2010 ===
On March 27, 2010, approximately 500 Coffee Party meetings took place across the United States. Coffee Party co-founder Annabel Park participated in one of the meetings, which was covered by C-SPAN and was crowded, and she observed that not all of the participants were behaving in a civil manner, especially Eric Mays, Mauricelm-Lei Millere, and those of The Black Coffee Party USA. Newsweek reported, "They were angry. They hated the Tea Party, and the Republican Party. They wanted to get even. One audience member said America was under the thumb of oligarchs and denounced 'moneyed interests.' A few people hissed when Sarah Palin's name was mentioned. Also on hand were the usual suspects drawn to the C-Span bat signal." Some in the crowd even decided they wanted a new leader for the movement, "not someone that says we can all work together." Park said later, "If they want to fire me, this may not be the group for them. We don't want conflict and confrontation."

=== Coffee Party Convention 2010 ===
The First Annual Coffee Party Convention was held at the Galt House Hotel in Louisville, Kentucky, from September 24 to 26, 2010. Some 350 chapter leaders and organizers met to hone their message before heading across the country in an effort to get people involved in what it considered a responsible way.

Featured events included a "Mock Constitutional Convention" co-chaired by Republican communication strategist for Bush and McCain, Mark McKinnon, and Harvard Law School Professor Lawrence Lessig; Across the Political Divide: A Transpartisan Dialogue with Joseph McCormick and a roundtable with journalist Linda Killian of U.S. News & World Report on the question, "What Can We Do for Our Country?" There were also scheduled workshops and panel discussions including members of both major political parties, chairwoman Amy Kremer of the Tea Party Express and co-founder Annabel Park of the Coffee Party.
