= Picture Bride (film) =

- Theatrical poster
- Directed by: Kayo Hatta
- Written by: Kayo Hatta; Mari Hatta
- Produced by: Diane Mark; Lisa Onodera
- Starring: Youki Kudoh; Akira Takayama; Tamlyn Tomita; Cary-Hiroyuki Tagawa; Toshiro Mifune
- Cinematography: Claudio Rocha
- Edited by: Lynzee Klingman
- Music by: Mark Adler
- Distributed by: Miramax Films
- Release dates: January 1995 (Sundance); May 5, 1995 (United States)
- Running time: 95 minutes
- Country: United States
- Languages: English; Japanese
- Budget: $2 million
- Box office: $1,238,905

Picture Bride is a 1995 American Japanese-language film directed by Kayo Hatta. It follows Riyo, who arrives in Hawaii as a "picture bride" at the turn of the century for a man she has never met before. The story is based on the historical practice, due to U.S. anti-miscegenation laws, of Japanese immigrant laborers in the United States using long-distance matchmakers in their homelands to find wives.

Released by Miramax Films, the film stars Youki Kudoh, Akira Takayama, Tamlyn Tomita, and Cary-Hiroyuki Tagawa, with a special appearance by Toshiro Mifune in his penultimate film role. Picture Bride premiered at the 1995 Sundance Film Festival, where it won the Audience Award for narrative dramatic feature film. Considered a landmark Asian American work, the film was an Official Selection at the 1994 Cannes Film Festival in the Un Certain Regard section and received an Independent Spirit Award nomination for Best First Feature.

== Plot ==
In 1918, Riyo is a young Japanese woman who becomes a picture bride for a man who works as a field hand on a sugarcane plantation in Hawaii. It is Riyo's aunt who facilitates the match as Riyo's father has long been deceased. Riyo is shown a picture of the handsome Matsuji, her husband-to-be in Hawaii. When Riyo arrives in Honolulu, she discovers that Matsuji is actually twenty years older than her, and had sent a photo that was taken of him when he was a young man. Riyo is disappointed but goes through with the wedding in a mass ceremony with other "picture couples".

She joins Matsuji on a wagon that takes her to her new home, a ramshackle house in the sugarcane plantation. As she walks past the darkened fields to their home, Riyo hears a faint sound on the wind of a woman singing. When she asks about it, Matsuji half-jokes that the ghosts of the canefields have come to welcome her. That night, they sleep on the same mat, but Riyo fights off his attempts at intimacy and hides beneath a blanket.

The next day, Riyo is given an ID tag to wear around her neck and goes to work in the sugarcane fields. She is unfamiliar with farm work and slows the other workers down, leading her to be harassed and ridiculed by Antone, the luna (field supervisor). Yayoi, who leads the women workers, prompts Kana, another picture bride who arrived several years before, to mentor Riyo. Over time, Riyo and Kana become friends. Riyo learns that Kana's husband Kanzaki frequently beats her and goes out gambling. To escape the abuse, Kana goes out to the fields at night with her baby, where she sings and sleeps.

Riyo agrees to help Kana with her side business of doing laundry for the workers. She saves her earnings from her laundry work and farm work in a tin can, determined to earn her passage back to Japan. Matsuji begins drinking and gambling, telling Riyo he intends to win enough money to get another bride. Kana advises Matsuji to become romantic and to take Rudolf Valentino as a role model to win Riyo's heart.

Meanwhile, Yayoi departs with her family for Honolulu, asking Kana to take care of the other women caneworkers. Antone the luna becomes more exacting on the workers to meet the harvest in time. One day, he has the workers set fire to the cane fields to burn off the leaves for harvesting, but in a hurry to get the job done, he does not let the women locate their children first. To Kana's horror, she cannot find her baby daughter Kei, who has wandered into the fields. She rushes into the burning field to find her daughter, but neither mother nor daughter returns.

After this tragedy, the workers talk about waging a strike. Matsuji asks Riyo to contribute some of her earnings to help with the strike, but she refuses, still nursing the hope she can use the money to return to Japan. One night, Riyo continues to hear the sound of a woman singing in the fields and leaves the house to follow the sound. Matsuji pursues her and accuses her of having a secret lover. As they sit under a tree, Riyo discloses that when she was a child, both of her parents died of tuberculosis, which at that time carried tremendous social stigma. Although Riyo was healthy, her matchmaker aunt lied to Matsuji about his bride-to-be's status. That night, when Riyo tentatively reaches out to him as they lie in bed, he brusquely turns away.

Feeling betrayed, the next day Riyo gathers her savings and a few belongings and runs away, eventually finding herself at the ocean. After falling asleep on the shore, she is awakened by the sound of singing and glimpses a woman walking among the shoreline rocks. She runs after the vision and encounters Kana, who says she is leaving for Japan. When Riyo asks to accompany her, Kana gently says, "Who waiting for you there?" As Yayoi had done when she left the plantation, Kana hands her neck tag to Riyo and tells her to "take care of the girls." Kana turns to walk toward the sea and fades out of sight.

Riyo awakens with Kana's neck tag in her hand. She returns to the plantation and to her house, where she finds Matsuji drunk. She puts him to bed, and he looks at her, saying, "I thought I was all alone again." Later that night, she hesitantly reaches out to touch his hand, and he reaches back; they embrace and consummate their relationship.

The next day, Riyo surprises the other workers when she begins singing in the fields, as Kana and Yayoi had done. Though Antone tries to make fun of Riyo, she continues to sing with the realization that she has picked up the mantle of leadership. Matsuji makes a gift of a Buddhist altar to Riyo to honor her parents, and she is touched at his acceptance of her past.

The film ends as Riyo, Matsuji, and the other workers dance in a circle at a lively Obon Festival. In a closing voiceover by Nobu McCarthy, an older Riyo describes how she imagines at times that she hears a woman's voice singing and realizes it is the voice of her own daughter singing to her children.

== Cast ==
- Youki Kudoh as Riyo
- Akira Takayama as Matsuji
- Tamlyn Tomita as Kana
- Cary-Hiroyuki Tagawa as Kanzaki
- Yoko Sugi as Aunt Sode
- Michael Ashby as McCullum
- James Grant Benton as Antone
- Christianne Mayes as Miss Pieper
- Toshiro Mifune as The Benshi
- Jason Scott Lee as Worker collecting pay (uncredited)
- Moe Keale as Hawaiian fisherman
- Kenny Endo as bon odori musician (uncredited)

== Critical reception ==
Picture Bride was met with critical acclaim. On review aggregate website Rotten Tomatoes, it has a score of 82% based on 11 reviews.

Roger Ebert awarded the film three out of four and wrote, "Picture Bride is one of several recent films about how we gathered from all over the globe to call ourselves Americans. 'My Family' is another, about Mexican-Americans. Of course, those early generations suffered much, but somehow the films are suffused with a certain serenity, because after all, the stories had a happy ending: They produced the children and grandchildren who are telling the tales."

Lisa Schwarzbaum of Entertainment Weekly gave a B+, saying the film is "a lyrical, elegantly composed drama." Peter Stack of the San Francisco Chronicle said Picture Bride is an "exceptionally lovely first feature film by Kayo Hatta" that "captures with disturbing simplicity the lonely terror affecting one such bride."

Alison Macor of the Austin Chronicle said "Picture Bride deservedly won this year's Audience Award at the Sundance Film Festival", as "director Hatta's first feature skillfully blends humor with the day-to-day drama of living in a land that is not one's own". Macor ended her review by saying, "although this is a small film in that it profiles an individual's drama rather than the human condition, Picture Bride does so with tremendous warmth and respect for its characters".

== Home media ==
In 2004, Miramax released a DVD which includes "The Picture Bride Journey", a documentary on the making of the film featuring the director, cast members, archival historical footage, and behind-the-scenes clips from the movie set.

As part of Asian American and Pacific Islander Heritage Month, the Criterion Channel included Picture Bride as part of its May 2022 streaming lineup.

Awards
Preceded by Spanking the Monkey	Sundance Audience Award: Dramatic; 1995	Succeeded by The Spitfire Grill
