= Picture bride =

20th-century matchmaking practice

The term picture bride refers to the practice in the early 20th century of immigrant workers (chiefly Japanese, Okinawan, and Korean) in Hawaii and the West Coast of the United States and Canada, as well as Brazil selecting brides from their native countries via a matchmaker, who paired bride and groom using only photographs and family recommendations of the possible candidates. This is an abbreviated form of the traditional matchmaking process and is similar in a number of ways to the concept of the mail-order bride.

== Motives of husbands ==
In the late 19th century, Japanese, Okinawan, and Korean men traveled to Hawaii as cheap labor to work on the sugarcane plantations. Some continued on to work on the mainland. These men had originally planned to leave plantation work and go back home after a few years or a contract was up. Between the years of 1886 and 1924, 199,564 Japanese entered Hawaii and 113,362 returned to Japan. However, many men did not make enough money to go back home. Also, in 1907 the Gentlemen's Agreement prohibited immigration from Hawaii to the mainland United States for laborers. Because now these men were put in situations with limited mobility, they had to make Hawaii or the mainland United States their home, and part of that was getting married. In Hawaii, the plantation owners also wanted to see the laborers get married. Though they had originally preferred single men, when the contract labor system was abolished, the owners thought that wives would make the men more likely to settle down and stay. Also, the plantation owners hoped that wives would limit the amount of gambling and opium smoking the workers did, and act as a morale booster for the men.

== Motives of picture brides ==
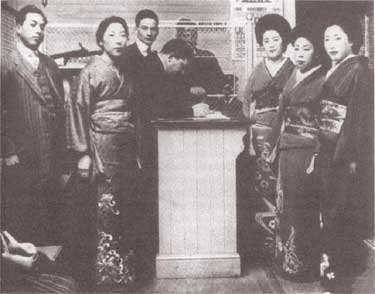
Japanese Picture Brides at Angel Island, Marin County, circa 1919.

There were many factors that influenced women to become picture brides. Some came from poor families, so they became picture brides for economic reasons. They thought that they would come upon economic prosperity in Hawaii and the continental United States, and could send back money to their families in Japan and Korea. There is evidence suggesting that picture brides were not infrequently educated at the high school or college level and were thus more emboldened to seek out new opportunities abroad. Others did it out of obligation to their families. Because the marriages were often facilitated by parents, the daughters felt they could not go against their parents' wishes. One former picture bride recounted her decision: "I had but remote ties with him yet because of the talks between our close parents and my parents' approval and encouragement, I decided upon our picture-bride marriage." There is, however, little to no indication that the brides were sold to their husbands by their families.

Some women became picture brides in an attempt to escape familial duties. They thought that by leaving Japan or Korea they could get out of responsibilities such as filial piety that came along with traditional marriage. Some women thought that they would gain freedoms denied to them in Japan and Korea. A quote from a Korean picture bride named Mrs. K embodies the mindset of many picture brides traveling to Hawaii, "Hawaii's a free place, everybody living well. Hawaii had freedom, so if you like talk, you can talk, if you like work, you can work." With the influx of women becoming picture brides, some women followed the trend as the thing to do. As one Japanese picture bride, Motome Yoshimura, explained, "I wanted to come to the United States because everyone else was coming. So I joined the crowd."

== Marriage process ==
These Japanese, Okinawan, and Korean women got the name picture brides because the men in Hawaii and mainland United States sent pictures back to their home countries in order to find a bride. Family members, often with the help of a go-between (called a nakōdo (仲人) in Japanese and a jungmae jaeng-i in Korean), used these photos to try to find wives for men who sent them. When looking at prospective brides the go-betweens looked at the family background, health, ages and wealth of the women. The process of picture bride marriage was modeled after traditional arranged marriage (called miai kekkon (見合い結婚) in Japanese and jungmae gyeolhon in Korean). Picture bride marriage was not much different from these arranged marriage customs, except instead of the man having little role he had no role. Once the bride's name was entered into her husband's family registry, the marriage was considered official in Japan, and she was eligible for travel documents to the U.S. However, even though this was sufficient in their home countries, it was not considered a valid form of marriage by the American government. Because of this, mass wedding ceremonies were held at the dock or in hotels subsequent to the brides' arrival.

== Immigration ==
The Gentlemen's Agreement of 1907 stopped the issuance of passports to Japanese laborers trying to go to continental America or Hawaii. However, there was a loophole in the agreement that allowed wives and children to immigrate to be with their husbands and fathers. It was because of this loophole that so many picture brides were able to immigrate to the United States. The impact of the Gentlemen's Agreement is evident in the population percentage of men and women before and after it was issued. For example, 86.7 percent of Japanese admitted to U.S. prior to Gentlemen's Agreement were men, though after the agreement only 41.6 percent of the Japanese admitted were men. By 1897, the Japanese were known as the largest single ethnic group in Hawaii, consisting of 40 percent of the population by the year 1900. Between 1907 and 1923 14,276 Japanese picture brides and 951 Korean picture brides arrived in Hawaii.

Likewise, Korean immigration to Hawaii was halted by Japan after Korea's new status as a Japanese protectorate in 1905. Picture brides, however, were an exception. While the ethnic Korean labor force could no longer enter the U.S. from Hawaii in 1907, by 1910 groups of picture brides from Korea had begun immigrating to the West Coast. In 1910, Korean men outnumbered women ten to one within the United States. By 1924 the population of Korean women had grown, the numbers reaching three men to one woman. This was due to many Korean girls already within the U.S. borders reaching marriage age, as well as the arrival of between 950 and 1,066 brides. Between 1908 and 1920 over 10,000 picture brides arrived on the West Coast of the United States.

== Arrival ==
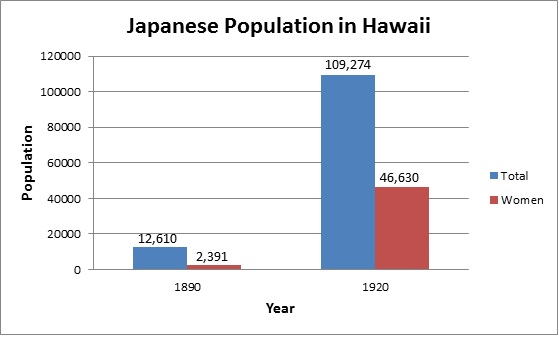
Population of Japanese men and women in Hawaii in the years 1890 and 1920. Numbers from Pau hana: Plantation life and labor in Hawaii 1835-1920 by Ronald T. Takaki.

It was a rough journey for the picture brides. When they first arrived, they were required to go through numerous inspections at the immigration station. The United States government did not recognize picture marriages as being legal; therefore, the picture brides would meet their soon-to-be husbands for the first time and attend a mass wedding ceremony on the docks. Many of these women were surprised at what they found upon arrival. Most of what the women knew about their husbands before meeting them was based on the photos they had sent. However, the images presented did not always represent the men's real lives. Men would send photos back to Japan and Korea that were retouched, old, or of different men completely. Men often wore borrowed suits and chose to pose with luxury items, such as cars and houses, that they did not actually own.

One picture bride summarizes the feelings of many of the brides subsequent to meeting their husbands; she writes, "I came to Hawaii and was so surprised and very disappointed, because my husband sent his twenty-five-year-old handsome-looking picture...He came to the pier, but I see he's really old, old-looking. He was forty-five years more old than I am. My heart stuck." On average, the grooms were ten to fifteen years older than their brides. The age of their husbands were not the only shock for the women, they were also taken aback by their living conditions. Many women expected to live in houses like ones in the photos the men sent them, but instead found plantation quarters that were crude, isolated, and racially segregated. One of the reasons that the grooms and go-betweens were not altogether truthful with the future brides was because they believed that the women would not come if they knew the reality of the man and his conditions.

== Life in Hawaii ==
Population percentages of Korean men and women in Hawaii in the years 1910 and 1920. Numbers from Pau hana: Plantation life and labor in Hawaii 1835-1920 by Ronald T. Takaki.

Though they were now living in Hawaii, the Japanese picture brides still felt it was important to preserve their traditions and heritage. The values they tried to instill in their children were filial piety, obligation to community and authority (on in the Japanese language), reciprocal obligation (giri in Japanese), the importance of hard work, perseverance, frugality, and a drive for success (seiko in Japanese). Many picture brides worked on the plantations. In 1920 fourteen percent of the workers on the plantations were female, and of those female workers, eighty percent were Japanese. On the plantation they usually irrigated and weeded the fields, stripped cane of dry leaves, or cut seed cane. Men were given similar tasks, but were often paid more. For example, in 1915 Japanese women plantation workers made 55 cents compared to the 78 cents made by their male counterparts.

In addition to working in the fields the women also were expected to take care of the house, which included cooking, cleaning, sewing and raising the children. When a woman could not afford childcare she might work with her child on her back. Some picture bride women with children left the fields to work for bachelor men by doing laundry, cooking, or providing clothing. Korean picture brides left plantation life sooner than many Japanese women did, and many moved to Honolulu to start their own businesses. Regardless of whether they stayed on the plantation or not, it was important to the picture brides to build communities between themselves through women's groups and churches.

== Problems with the practice ==
Though initially unhappy, most of the picture brides eventually settled into their marriages or just accepted them so they did not shame their families. Japanese couples were often from similar areas of Japan and therefore had fewer marital issues than Korean couples who were often from different areas of Korea. Though, there were exceptions to this, and not every marriage worked out. Some of the picture brides, after seeing their husbands for the first time, rejected them and went back to Japan or Korea. The bonds of these marriages were tenuous enough that bride Lee Young Oak and her husband Chung Bong Woon were met with praise and relief by their fellow Koreans in Hawaii for the relative success and happiness of their marriage while on their honeymoon in Honolulu. Some married husbands turned out to be alcoholics, physically abusive, or tried to sell them into brothels, but many of these women nevertheless stayed in the marriage for the sake of the children.

An example of a picture bride who stayed married to her husband, despite his mistreatment of her, was Shizuko Tamaki; she and her husband were married for 50 years. Others who initially married did not end up staying with their husbands. These picture brides resorted to elopement with another man, or kakeochi in Japanese. Elopement was especially hazardous to the picture brides because of its endangerment of their reputation and their residency in the United States. Wives who eloped could be deported to Japan, following the Japanese civil code that granted the husbands the ability to decide the new residency of their wife; for those women, the Women's Home Missionary Society in the United States provided temporary housing while they waited to go back to Japan. In order to find their wives who had disappeared, the husbands of these women would take out reward ads in Issei community newspapers for whoever could find their wife.

Many residents of the American continent and Hawaii thought that the Gentlemen's Agreement would end Japanese immigration to the United States, so when vast numbers of picture brides started arriving, it revitalized the Anti-Japanese Movement. The people who were against the immigration of the Japanese and picture brides were called exclusionists. They called picture bride marriage uncivilized because it did not involve love or have any regard to morality; exclusionists thought of picture bride marriage as a violation of the Gentlemen's Agreement, since they believed the women were more like workers rather than wives to the men. Exclusionists also feared that children produced from picture bride marriages would be a dangerous addition to the population because they would be able to buy land for their parents in the future. Also, some people, many immigrant inspectors included, thought that picture bride marriage was a disguise for a prostitution trade. Overall, there was a negative sentiment toward picture brides in the United States.

== End of the practice ==
In order to maintain positive relations with the United States, the Japanese government stopped issuing passports to picture brides on March 1, 1920, because they were so ill-received in the United States. The end of picture brides left around 24,000 bachelors with no way to return to Japan and bring back a wife. Despite this, picture brides and the Gentlemen's Agreement were able to create a second Japanese generation, Nisei, consisting of 30,000 people in 1920.

== In popular culture ==
Yoshiko Uchida's novel, titled Picture Bride (1987), tells the story of a fictional Japanese woman named Hana Omiya, a picture bride sent to live with her new husband in Oakland, California in 1917. The novel also focuses on her experiences in a Japanese internment camp in 1943.

The feature film Picture Bride (1994; unrelated to Uchida's novel), created by the Hawaii-born director Kayo Hatta and starring Youki Kudoh in the title role, tells the story of Riyo, a Japanese woman whose photograph exchange with a plantation worker leads her to Hawaii.

The Korean language book entitled Sajin Sinbu (2003; Korean for "Picture Bride"), compiled by Park Nam Soo, provides a thorough Korean/Korean American cultural approach to the topic, providing an historical overview of the picture bride phenomenon in the Korean context, as well as related poetry, short stories, essays, and critical essays written by various Korean/Korean American authors. The book was compiled for the Korean Centennial, marking the 100 anniversary of the first known arrival of Korean immigrants to U.S. territory in 1903 aboard RMS Gaelic.

Alan Brennert's novel, Honolulu by (2009) features a Korean picture bride coming to Hawaii.

Julie Otsuka's novel, The Buddha in the Attic (2011), describes the lives of picture brides brought from Japan to San Francisco about a century ago and what it means to be an American in uncertain times. The novel was a National Book Award for fiction finalist in 2011 and was short listed for 2013 Dublin IMPAC literary award.

The finale episode of the AMC TV series, The Terror: Infamy (2019), reveals that before dying and returning as a yūrei, Yūko was a picture bride, with tragic consequences.

In the 2023 children's book "Brave Mrs. Sato" written by Lori Matsukawa and illustrated by Tammy Yee, readers learn about a picture bride who emigrated from Japan to Hawaii and developed a friendship with a young girl and taught her about her Japanese heritage and experiences as a picture bride. The book is based upon the author's real-life experiences with her own babysitter.

== See also ==
- List of China-related topics
- List of Japan-related topics
- Mail-order bride
- Proxy marriage
