= Annabel Park =

American filmmaker (born 1968)

Annabel Park (Korean: 박수현) is an American documentary filmmaker, political activist and community volunteer.

== Early years ==
Born in 1968 in Seoul, South Korea, Annabel immigrated to the United States with her family when she was nine years old, and was raised in Texas and Maryland. She studied Philosophy at Boston University and Political Theory at Oxford as a Marshall Scholar.

== Career history ==
Park has worked in her family owned truck diner, worked as a nanny in New York City and briefly worked in strategic planning at The New York Times as a strategy analyst. She has also worked as playwright, theater director, and documentary film maker.

== Political activism ==
Park was the national coordinator for a network of second-generation Korean Americans, the 121 Coalition, and was instrumental in the passing of House Resolution 121. She co-directed and produced the documentary, 9500 Liberty, about the battle over the "Immigration Resolution" law in Virginia.

She is a co-founding member and was initially the de facto-coordinator of Coffee Party USA, an organization which described itself as a fact-based, non-partisan and solutions-based network that considered itself to be a "more thoughtful and reasoned alternative to the Tea Party." Park served for a time as spokesperson and Advisory Board member for Coffee Party USA. She has since departed the organization due to dissatisfaction with its governance process. She was a volunteer for Jim Webb's 2006 US Senate campaign and for Barack Obama's 2008 presidential campaign.

Park is the creator and content producer for the interactive documentary 2010 Okinawa, exploring the controversy over U.S. bases in Okinawa. She teamed with film director Eric Byler on the web series Story of America (https://storyofamericafilm.com/feature-film/) which helped to launch both the Moral Monday movement and the "Walking Mayor" Adam O'Neal and the fight for rural healthcare (SaveourHospital.org).

== Filmography ==
"9500 Liberty" was directed by Annabel Park and Eric Byler. It chronicles the only eight weeks in American history where an "Arizona style" immigration crackdown was actually implemented, and why it was quickly repealed. "9500 Liberty" began as an "interactive documentary," allowing its viewers to not only comment, but suggest new directions and additional coverage of the story, which was uploaded almost immediately after it was shot. Today there are more than 100 installments on the YouTube channel, most of them posted between September 2007 and June 2008. These videos were combined with never-before-seen footage, including a behind-the-scenes portrayal of Park and Byler's challenge with citizen journalism and civic duty in the midst of a divisive culture war, to create the critically acclaimed feature film. "9500 Liberty" is the winner of four film festival awards. It was released theatrically in more than 30 cities, and picked up by MTV Networks for a Sept 26, 2010 cable premiere.

"Story of America" is an ambitious documentary web series launched in 2012 directed by Annabel Park about searching for hope and healing in America's divide. A particular focus on voting rights called attention to voter suppression in many states and counties, particularly during the 2012 US Presidential election, when elected officials, such as Elijah Cummings, and lawyers and activists were interviewed to share what they witnessed in terms of the practices used to block minority voters from exercising their rights at the polls.
