= American Knees =

1995 novel by Shawn Wong

- Author: Shawn Wong
- Language: English
- Genre: Novel
- Publisher: University of Washington Press
- Publication date: 1995
- Publication place: United States
- Media type: Print (hardback & paperback)
- Pages: 240 pp
- ISBN: 978-0-295-98496-4
- OCLC: 57342291
- Dewey Decimal: 813/.54 22
- LC Class: PS3573.O583 A8 2005

American Knees is a novel written by Shawn Wong, first published in 1995 by Simon & Schuster, and later republished by the University of Washington Press in 2005.

Wong's book depicts the love life of an East Asian American man with three women. The novel chronicles romantic chapters in the life of Raymond Ding, a Chinese American university administrator who first marries and divorces a Chinese American woman, then dates and breaks up with a hapa (biracial) younger woman, and later gets involved with a Vietnamese American co-worker who is haunted by memories of the Vietnam War.

== Publishing history ==
- Simon & Schuster, 1995
- Scribner, 1996
- University of Washington Press, 2005

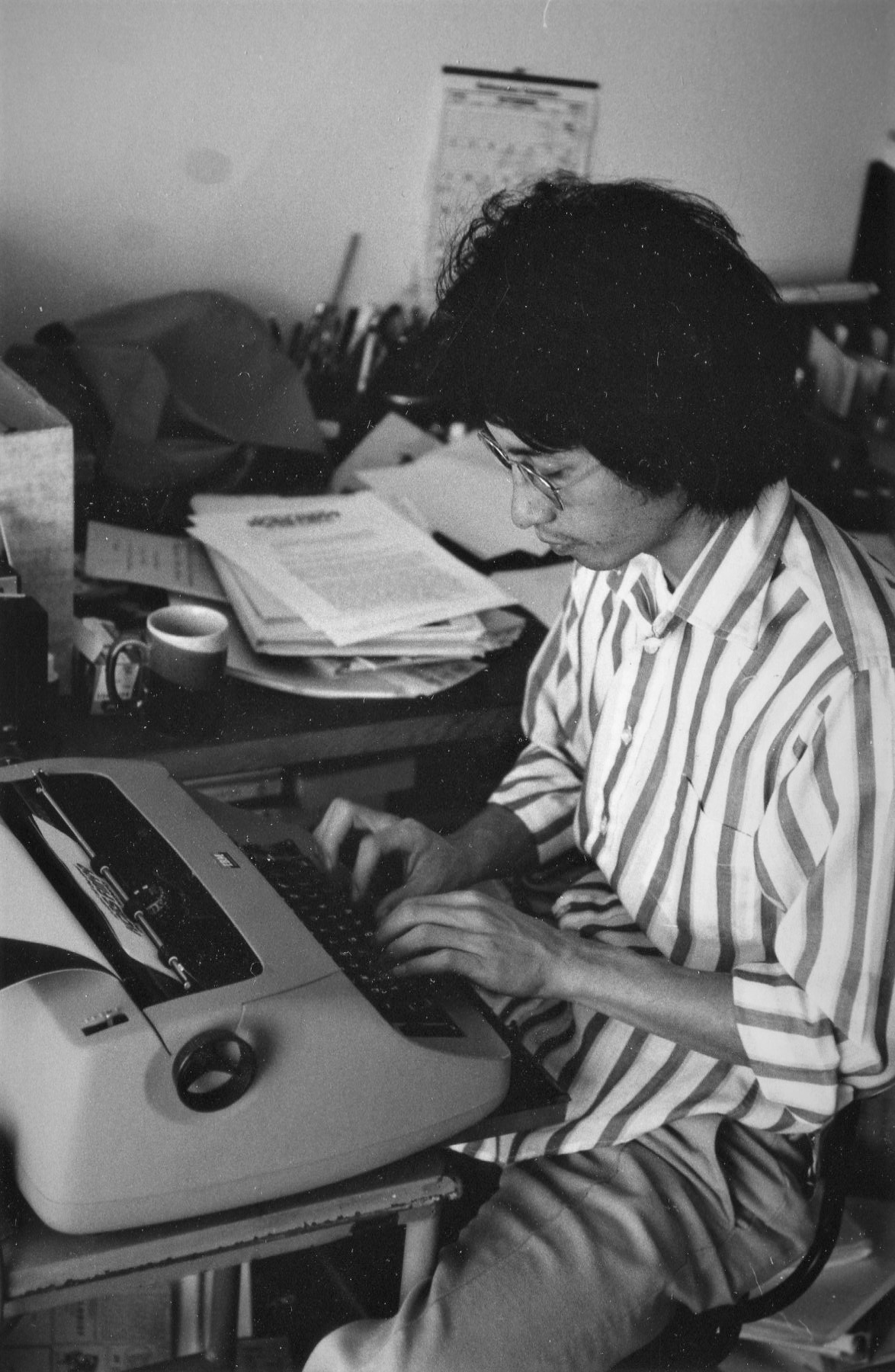
Writer Shawn Hsu Wong, 1975

== Movie version ==
A film adaptation, called Americanese (2006), was written and directed by Eric Byler, produced by Lisa Onodera, and stars Chris Tashima as Raymond Ding. The film was acquired by IFC Films.
