= Americanese =

- Directed by: Eric Byler
- Written by: Eric Byler
- Based on: American Knees by Shawn Wong
- Produced by: Lisa Onodera
- Starring: Chris Tashima; Allison Sie; Kelly Hu; Ben Shenkman; Autumn Reeser; Joan Chen
- Cinematography: Rob Humphreys; Stacy Toyama
- Edited by: Kenn Kashima
- Music by: Michael Brook
- Distributed by: IFC First Take
- Release date: March 2006 (SXSW)
- Running time: 110 minutes
- Country: United States
- Languages: English; Mandarin; Cantonese

Americanese is a 2006 American independent romantic drama film directed by Eric Byler and starring Chris Tashima, Allison Sie, Kelly Hu, Ben Shenkman, Autumn Reeser, and Joan Chen. It is based on the novel American Knees by Shawn Wong, concerning the relationships of a man and woman of East Asian descent in the United States.

== Background ==
The film was written and directed by Eric Byler, adapted from the novel, "American Knees," by Shawn Wong. It was produced by Lisa Onodera, who optioned the book when it was first published in 1995. The film had its world premiere at the South by Southwest Film Festival (SXSW) in 2006, where it won the Audience Award for Best Narrative Feature and a Special Jury Prize for Outstanding Ensemble Cast. In October 2006, IFC Films acquired the film for distribution, under their IFC First Take distribution arm, which will release the film on a "day-and-date" platform, which will include a limited theatrical release accompanied simultaneously with a video on demand (V.O.D.) broadcast premiere on Comcast cable.

== Premise ==
Raymond Ding, a middle-aged Chinese American college professor, and Aurora Crane, his younger Hapa (half East Asian) girlfriend, have just split, but continue to drift in and out of each other's lives. Unable to fully let go, Raymond visits the apartment they once shared, during the day while Aurora is away. Aurora is haunted by flash-backs of moments from their relationship.

Encouraged by their best friends to move on, Raymond and Aurora each begin new relationships. Aurora dates Steve, a white man closer to her age (and also her best friend's former boyfriend). Raymond dates Betty, a Vietnamese American colleague, who he soon discovers is haunted by her own past. Race and identity issues begin to surface as Raymond and Aurora try to start new lives, but remain drawn to their past.

== Cast ==
- Chris Tashima as Raymond Ding
- Allison Sie as Aurora Crane
- Joan Chen as Betty Nguyen
- Kelly Hu as Brenda Nishitani
- Ben Shenkman as Steve
- Sab Shimono as Wood Ding
- Michael Paul Chan as Jimmy Chan
- Autumn Reeser as Sylvia
- Ryan Cutrona as Hank Crane
- Takayo Fischer as Keiko Crane
- Annie Katsura Rollins as Julia Crane
- Greg Watanabe as Young Wood
- Stephen Bishop as Miles
- Munda Razooki as Test Driver #1
- Nathaniel H. Taylor as Test Driver #2
- Tyler Hori as Little Raymond
- Michael Potter as University Administrator
- Carol Saraceno as Woman with Dog
- Yuri Treschuck as Amerasian Youth at Bus Stop
- Jen Brown as Rumana
- Kayvon Esmaili as Brenda's Boyfriend at Party
- Teddy Chen Culver as Rumana's Boyfriend
- Pearl Wong as Helen Ding

== Film festivals ==
=== 2006 ===
- South by Southwest Film Festival, in competition – Austin, TX
- 24th San Francisco International Asian American Film Festival, Opening Night film – San Francisco, CA
- 11th Chicago Asian American Showcase, Opening Night film – Chicago, IL
- 22nd VC FilmFest, Closing Night film – Los Angeles, CA
- 9th Aurora Asian Film Festival, Opening Night film – Aurora, CO
- 32nd Seattle International Film Festival – Seattle, WA
- 7th DC Asian Pacific American Film Festival, Opening Night film – Washington, DC
- 14th Hamptons International Film Festival, in competition – East Hampton, NY
- 26th Hawaii International Film Festival – Honolulu, HI
- 29th Denver Film Festival – Denver, CO

=== 2007 ===
- 9th Wisconsin Film Festival, Diaspora Melancholy: Asian American Films, co-presented by the Asian American Studies Program, University of Wisconsin–Madison – Madison, WI

== Critical reception ==
Americanese was met with generally positive reviews. The film has a score of 67% from Rotten Tomatoes based on nine reviews.

Acclaimed film critic Roger Ebert from the Chicago Sun-Times awarded the film three and a half out of four, and wrote "Byler deals with characters who have lived their years, learned from them, and try to apply their values to their lives. Their romances are not heedless but wary, and involve a lot of negotiation," and finished by calling the film "...uncommonly absorbing".

Kevin Crust of the Los Angeles Times stated that Americanese had "fine, understated performances and the self-assured way that Byler lets the film find its own rhythms, rather than setting into some template, result in a mature film of subtle complexity".

== Awards ==
- Audience Award – Best Narrative Feature – SXSW
- Special Jury Prize – Outstanding Ensemble Cast – SXSW
- Golden Space Needle Audience Award – Best Actor, 2nd Runner-Up (Chris Tashima) – Seattle International Film Festival
