= 9500 Liberty =

- Directed by: Annabel Park; Eric Byler
- Produced by: Alex Rigopulos; Chris Rigopulos
- Cinematography: Eric Byler; Jeff Man
- Edited by: Eric Byler
- Music by: Michael Brook
- Release date: November 15, 2009 (SLIFF)
- Running time: 81 minutes
- Country: United States
- Language: English

9500 Liberty is a 2009 documentary film about the struggle over immigration in Prince William County, Virginia. It was directed by Annabel Park and Eric Byler.

== Content ==
The film chronicles an eight-week period wherein an "Arizona-style" immigration crackdown was implemented and quickly repealed. 9500 Liberty began as an "interactive documentary," allowing its viewers to not only comment, but to help determine direction and additional coverage of the story, which was uploaded to a YouTube channel as footage was shot. These videos were combined with additional unreleased footage (including the directors' attempts at citizen journalism and civic duty amidst an antagonistic climate) to create the documentary.

== Release and Reception ==
9500 Liberty garnered four film festival awards, and was released theatrically in select cities; it was picked up by MTV Networks for a Sept. 26, 2010 cable premiere.
