= Homebase (novel) =

Book by Shawn Wong

- First image
- Author: Shawn Wong
- Language: English
- Genre: Literary fiction
- Publisher: Reed, Cannon & Johnson Publishing Co. University of Washington Press
- Publication date: 1979
- Publication place: United States
- Media type: Print (hardback & paperback)
- Pages: 102 pp
- ISBN: 978-0-295-98816-0

Homebase is a novel written by Shawn Wong, first published in 1979 by Reed, Cannon & Johnson Publishing Co.. It was also published by Plume in 1991 and is currently distributed by the University of Washington Press.

== Publishing history ==
- Reed, Cannon & Johnson Publishing Co., 1979
- re-issued by Plume/NAL, 1990
- re-issued by University of Washington Press, 2008

== Reception ==
"Misty, poetic and often sensual, Homebase is an evocative portrait of a young man caught between two cultures." said Charles Solomon in the Los Angeles Times.

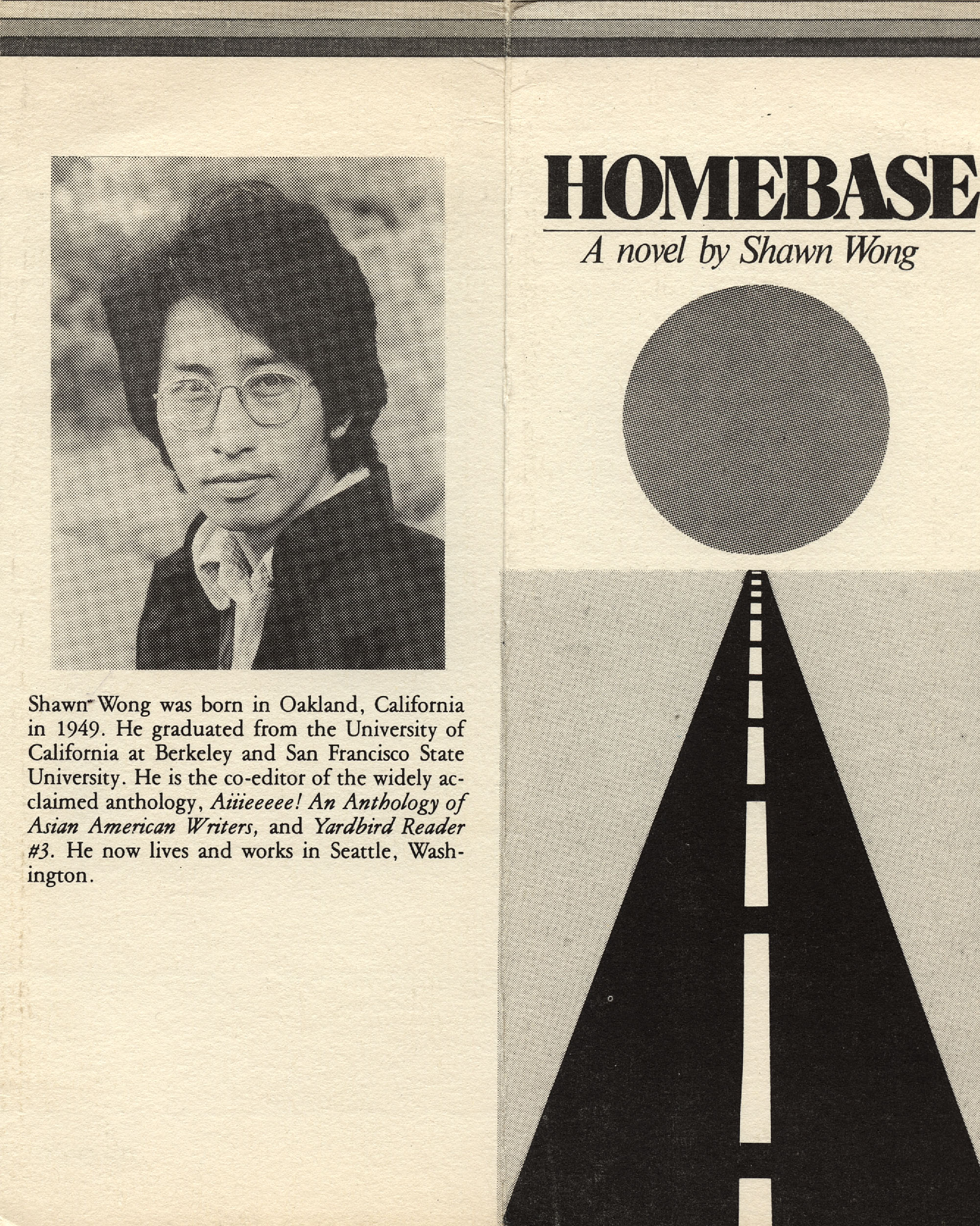
Homebase book brochure, 1979

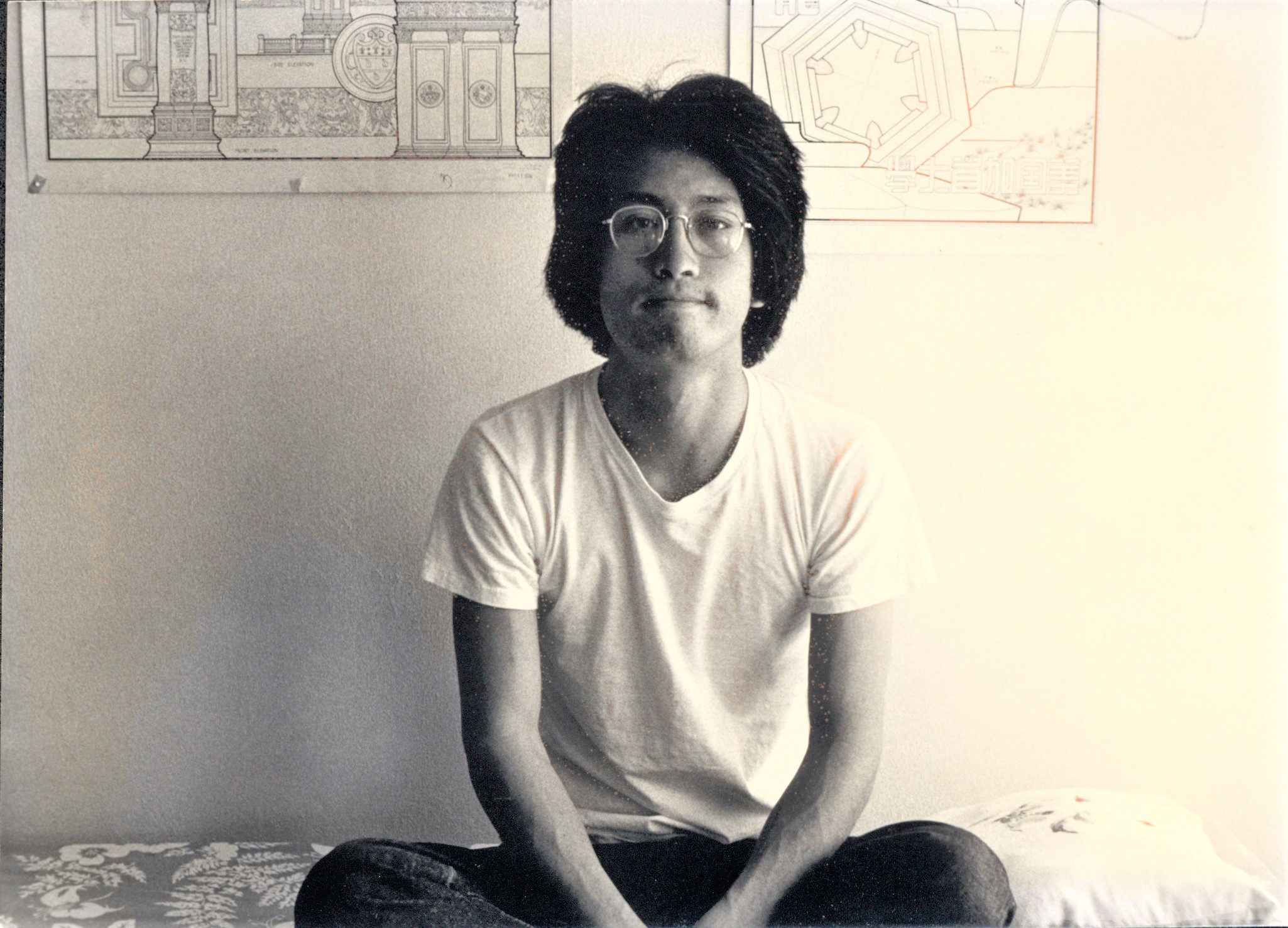
Snapshot of the writer as a young man, 1975
