= Shawn Wong =

Chinese American author and scholar (born 1949)

Shawn H. Wong
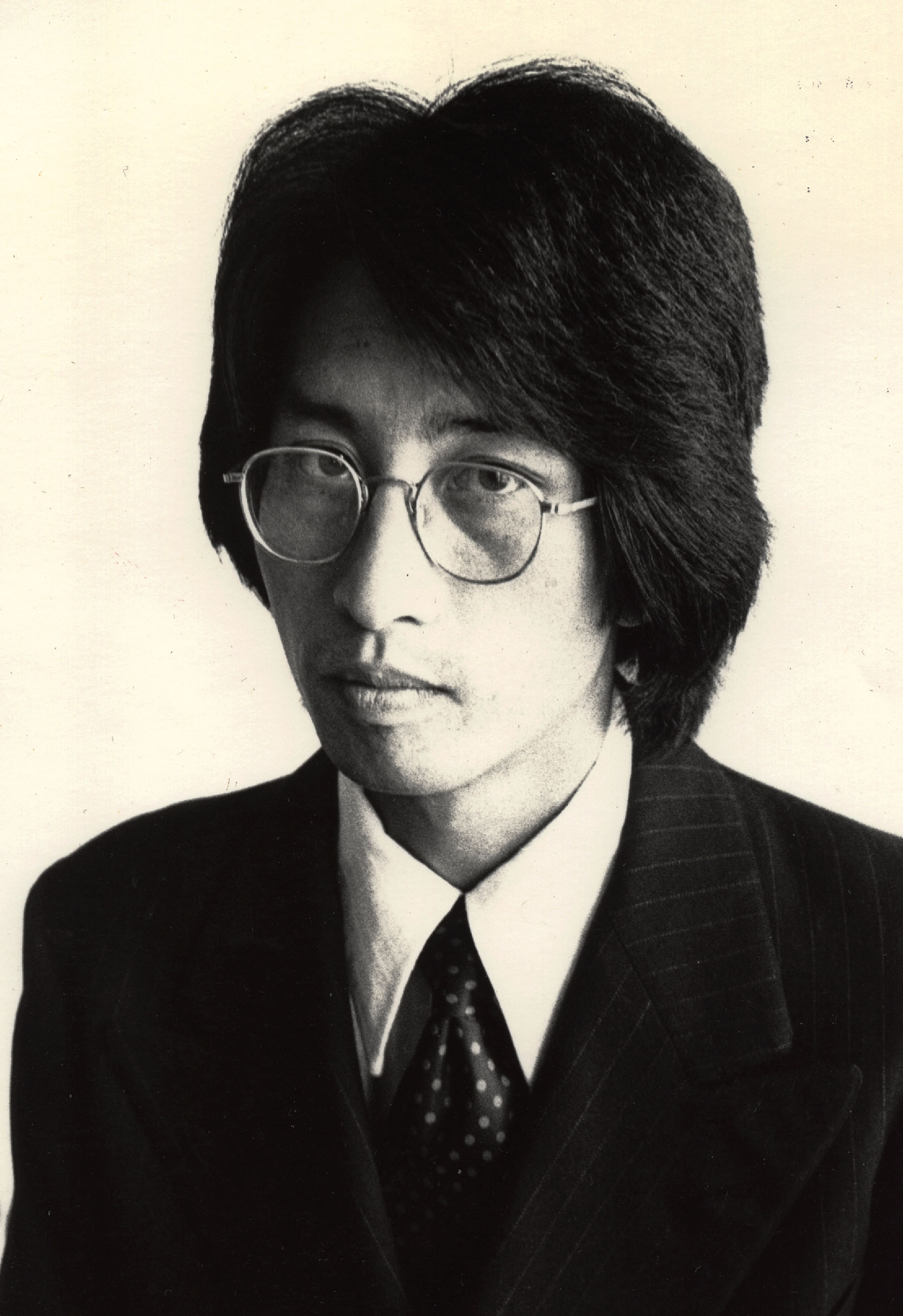
- Born: August 11, 1949 (age 77); Oakland, California
- Occupations: Writer; editor; professor
- Writing career
- Notable work: Aiiieeeee! An Anthology of Asian-American Writers

Shawn H. Wong is a Chinese American author and scholar. He has served as the Professor of English, Director of the University Honors Program (2003–06), Chair of the Department of English (1997–2002), and Director of the Creative Writing Program (1995–97) at the University of Washington, where he has been on the faculty since 1984. There, he teaches courses spanning critical theory, fiction writing, and Asian American studies, a field in which he is considered a pioneer. Wong received his undergraduate degree in English from the University of California, Berkeley (1971) and his master's degree in Creative Writing at San Francisco State University (1974).

== Writings ==
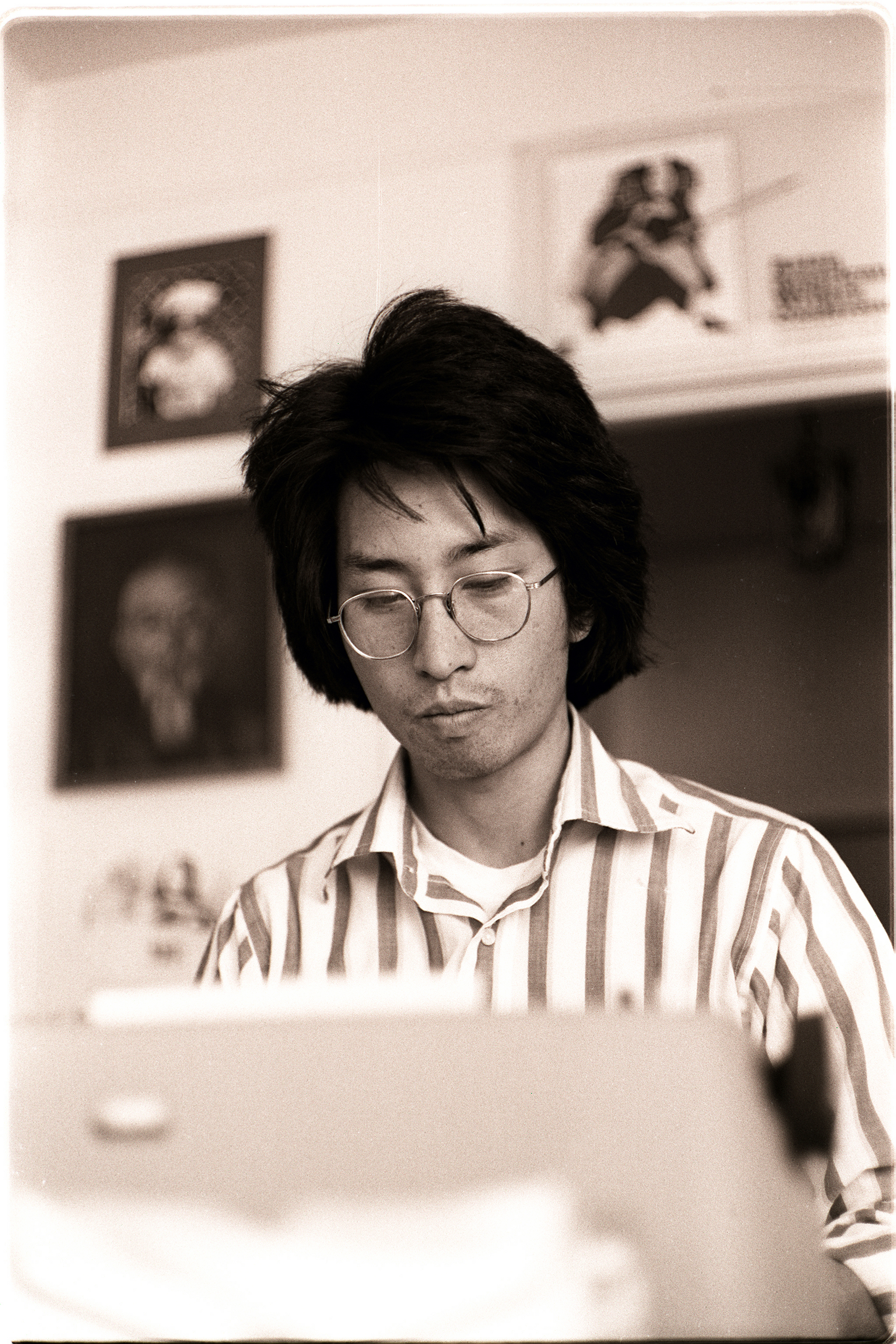
Shawn Wong in San Francisco, California, 1975

Wong's first novel, Homebase, was published by Reed and Cannon in 1979. It subsequently won both the Pacific Northwest Booksellers Association Award and the 15th Annual Governor's Writers Day Award of Washington. Simon & Schuster published his second novel, American Knees, in 1996, and went on to be adapted into an independent feature film entitled Americanese (2010). It was originally conceived of when his wife requested he write "something she could read at the beach." The film was written and directed by Eric Byler and produced by Lisa Onodera. The book was re-issued in 2005 by University of Washington Press.

Wong explained the title "American Knees" as an extension of his childhood: "When I was a child, kids used to come up to me and ask, 'What are you: Chinese, Japanese or Americanese?', while some asked if I was 'Chinese, Japanese or dirty knees?'"

"I never really knew what that meant when I was a kid," Wong says, "but I knew I didn't like it."

Wong is also co-editor of six multicultural literary anthologies, including the pioneering anthology Aiiieeeee! An Anthology of Asian-American Writers (reprinted in four different editions), Literary Mosaic: Asian American and Asian Diasporas, Cultures, Identities, Representations, and The Big Aiiieeeee! He is a co-editor of Before Columbus Foundation Fiction/Poetry Anthology: Selections from the American Book Awards, 1980-1990 – two volumes of contemporary American multicultural poetry and fiction.

Wong has been awarded a National Endowment for the Arts Creative Writing Fellowship and a Rockefeller Foundation residency in Italy. He was featured in the 1997 PBS documentary Shattering the Silences, and in the Bill Moyers' PBS documentary Becoming American: The Chinese Experience, in 2003. He is also featured in the 2005 documentary What's Wrong With Frank Chin?

Wong also serves as consulting and contributing editor for Transtext(e)s-Transcultures: A Journal of Global Cultural Studies.

Wong's third fiction novel, titled The Ancient and Occupied Heart of Grieg Xu, is set to be released in May of 2027. It is set in Seattle and follows a professor of classics as he contends with the grieving process.

== Career ==
Shawn Wong specializes in creative writing and Asian American studies. Since 1972, he has taught at several colleges and universities, including Mills College, University of California, Santa Cruz, San Francisco State University, and the University of Washington. He has also taught at the University of Tübingen (Germany), Jean Moulin University (Lyon), and at the University of Washington Rome Center (Italy).

Alongside longtime collaborator Brian McDonald, he is on the faculty of the Red Badge Project, which teaches storytelling to veterans suffering from PTSD, depression, or anxiety disorders.

== Personal life ==
Wong does not speak any Chinese. He has one brother who works as a body piercer in Minnesota and one son.

== Bibliography ==
=== Novel ===
- Homebase (1979). Reed & Cannon.
- American Knees (1995). Simon & Schuster.

=== Editor ===
- Asian Diasporas: Cultures, Identities, Representations (with Robbie Goh), Hong Kong University Press, 2004
- The Literary Mosaic: An Anthology of Asian American Literature, Harper Collins, 1995
- The Before Columbus Foundation Fiction Anthology: Selections from the American Book Awards 1980-1990 (with Ishmael Reed and Kathryn Trueblood), W. W. Norton Co., 1992
- The Before Columbus Foundation Poetry Anthology: Selections from the American Book Awards 1980-1990 (with J. J. Phillips, Ishmael Reed, Gundars Strads), W .W. Norton Co., 1992
- The Big Aiiieeeee! An Anthology of Chinese American and Japanese American Literature (with Jeffery Paul Chan, Frank Chin, and Lawson Fusao Inada), Meridian/NAL, 1991
- Yardbird Reader Volume 3 (with Frank Chin), Yardbird Publishing Inc., 1974
- Aiiieeeee! An Anthology of Asian American Writers (with Frank Chin, Jeffery Paul Chan, Lawson Fusao Inada), Howard University Press, 1974; most recent re-issue by Meridian, 1997

== See also ==
- Chinese American literature
- List of Asian American writers
