= Wild Meat and the Bully Burgers =

1996 novel by Lois-Ann Yamanaka

- First edition
- Author: Lois-Ann Yamanaka
- Cover artist: Fritz Metsch
- Language: English-Hawaiian Pidgin
- Genre: Japanese Americans-Hawaii-Fiction
- Publisher: Farrar Straus, New York; HarperCollins, Canada
- Publication date: 1996
- Publication place: United States and Canada (simultaneously)
- Media type: Print (Hardback)
- Pages: 276 pp
- ISBN: 0-374-29020-2 (hardcover 1st edition)
- OCLC: 32431468
- Dewey Decimal: 813/.54 20
- LC Class: PS3575.A434 W55 1996
- Preceded by: Saturday Night at the Pahala Theatre: A book of Poems written in Hawaiian Pidgin (1993)
- Followed by: Blu's Hanging (1997)

Wild Meat and the Bully Burgers is a Japanese American-Hawaiian adult fiction novel by Lois-Ann Yamanaka. Its tonality is distinctive to that of a local Hawaiian culture in that all the main characters speak in Hawaiian Pidgin. Although it is an adult fiction novel, the plot follows a young Japanese girl throughout her years in middle school. The major themes of the novel include comparing a mother-daughter relationship with a father-daughter one, finding one's identity, and the politics of Japanese Hawaiian culture in a white America.

Sections of the novel were adapted for the award-winning film, Fishbowl (2005), by Hawaii filmmaker Kayo Hatta, that aired nationally on PBS in 2006.

== Plot introduction ==
The novel's characters and setting stay true to Lois-Ann Yamanaka's local upbringing on the Big Island of Hawaii. Written in both English and Hawaiian Pidgin, Wild Meat and the Bully Burgers is a coming-of-age first-person narrative of Lovey Nariyoshi, a local Japanese girl growing up in Hilo, Hawaii in the 1970s. During the anti-Japanese wave that flowed through the United States during this time period, Lovey looks back at all of the key events and people in her life that help shape the young girl she becomes in the end. By only seeing white stars on TV, discovering the birthing canal with her pregnant teenage-neighbor Katy, rationalizing her best friend Jerome's homosexuality and other events, Lovey tries to find her place in the world - a world that constantly tells her that being pure Japanese is not beautiful.

=== Explanation of the novel's title ===
Apart from being the title of the novel, "Wild Meat and the Bully Burgers" is also the title of the eleventh chapter in the book. Here, Lovey describes the wild animals that her father, Hubert, hunts, kills, and cooks for the family. One day Hubert brings home a black-and-white calf that Lovey's sister Calhoon names Bully. The chapter ends when Hubert fries hamburgers for the girls, burgers made with Bully meat. The wild smell of the Bully Burgers fills the entire kitchen, and neither of them can eat dinner that night.

== Plot summary ==
The novel takes place, roughly, over a period of three years. Part One begins when Lovey is in the sixth grade and she and her best friend Jerry are watching a Shirley Temple movie. Lovey comments on how there is always a happy ending in movies, but never in real life – especially in her own life where she is pure Japanese, and not pretty like the haoles and hapa children in her class. And so she and Jerry constantly make up their own obituaries when they are playing together.

We are introduced to both of Lovey's parents in Part One: Verva Nariyoshi being the mother that always seems unhappy with Lovey, and Hubert Nariyoshi being the father that treats Lovey like the son he never had. Other characters in this section include Katy – the Nariyoshi's pregnant teenage neighbor that teaches Lovey that babies come out of a woman's vagina and not the other end. Aunt Helen is another neighbor, and Verva's best friend.

Among all the characters in the novel, Lovey learns the most from her father Hubert. He teaches her about the "dominate and recessid jeans" of pea flowers and rabbit mating on their farm, hunting wild turkey and other animals, and tells her not to get too close to any the animals bred for food - like the cow that Calhoon names Bully. Hubert also teaches Lovey about his Japanese Samurai ancestors, how they moved to Hawaii to work on the plantations on the island of Kauai, and how Lovey should be proud of her heritage.

Part Two begins at school, probably at the beginning of the seventh grade. Although Jerry is handsome enough to attract the eyes of the popular Lori Shigemura, their classmates still call him "Queer" and "Fag" and call Lovey "Queen" and "Lez." This is the section where Jerry's homosexuality is alluded to the most. He and Lovey both argue over who David Cassidy would rather date, and they both decide that it would be a blonde haole girl. This is also where Lovey gets her period and realizes that she hates being a girl.

In this section we are introduced to Jerry's older high school-aged brother Larry. Larry is always violent towards Lovey and Cal and Jerry, later killing their pet Koi in Part Three because they watch him and his girlfriend Crystal have sex in her bedroom.

Part Three is where most of the rising action occurs throughout the novel. Lovey and Jerry are now in their last year of middle school. We are given fuller descriptions of the Rays of the Rising Sun, a YMCA club consisting of the most popular girls in Lovey's class. Lori is a part of this group, and dances with Jerry at their Graduation Dance at the end of the year. Lori is constantly calling Lovey names because she is jealous of the relationship she has with Jerry.

And as mentioned before, Larry kills Lovey and Calhoon's pet Koi out of anger - Crystal gets pregnant and her mother takes her to Japan to abort the baby. However, a few months after she comes back home, she again gets pregnant by Larry. Refusing to live with the shame, she hangs herself.

But the most traumatic event in Part Three is when Hubert loses his eyesight during a hunting accident. Out of anger he yells and throws dirt at Lovey. And out of guilt he gets drunk and accidentally blows out his eyes when trying to shoot a deer. Lovey feels responsible, and finally learns that being proud of her ancestry is more important than the physical things that she lacks - things that society tells her she should have. Lovey flies to the island of Kauai to get a bag filled with dirt for her father to "see" his home again.

== Characters ==
Lovey Nariyoshi - main character and protagonist of the novel. Lovey is the narrator, speaking in both standard English and Hawaiian Pidgin. Lovey hates being pure Japanese and would prefer to be haole or hapa. She and her best friend Jerry are in middle school and constantly pretend they are popular television characters including Shirley Temple and Donny Osmond & Marie Osmond. Lovey also hates being a girl, and she would much rather be a boy and hunt like her father, Hubert. Because of her self-loathing, Lovey is constantly butting heads with Hubert. It isn't until a terrible accident that Lovey begins to accept her heritage.

Hubert Nariyoshi - Lovey's father and the antagonist of the novel. It is through Hubert that Lovey undergoes a change in understanding and character by the end. Hubert lived and worked on the rice plantations on the island of Kaua'i. He left the island, moved to the Big Island of Hawaii and it is there where he raises his two daughters. He is married to Verva, although he plays a bigger role in Lovey's life than Verva.

Jerome "Jerry" - Lovey's best friend. His homosexuality is alluded to many times throughout the novel, but it is clear that he and Lovey have a deeper love beyond friendship. His quest for popularity with their classmates leaves Lovey alone at times, but he always comes back to her when these "friendships" do not work out. Jerry is tall and skinny, and although he is smaller than the other boys in their middle school, Jerry is good-looking enough to get the attention of popular girls.

Calhoon Nariyoshi - Lovey's younger sister. Cal and Lovey constantly butt heads, both vying for their father's affections. She gives Lovey derogatory nicknames throughout the book, including Oompa Loompa when their mother tries to Toni Perm her hair, and the name "Bloody Lovey" when Lovey gets her period. Cal is the typical younger sibling, sometimes understanding, but most of the time tattling on Lovey and Jerry. Verva constantly compares Lovey to Cal, wondering why her older daughter can't be like the younger one.

Verva Nariyoshi - Lovey's mother. Her role is both small in the novel, as well as in Lovey's life. She smokes Parliaments and constantly tries to change the outward appearance of Lovey. She blames her daughters for not being able to give Hubert a male heir.

Uncle Tora - Hubert's older brother. As a boy Tora was mean to Hubert. Later he writes Hubert a letter, apologizing for how he treated him as a child. Tora is the one that tells Hubert about the Nariyoshi's family heritage, stemming from Samurai in Russia. Tora plays a bigger role towards the end when he comes back and helps the family after the accident.

Larry - Jerry's violent older brother. He is always physically hurting Lovey, Jerry, and Cal. His girlfriend, Crystal, gets pregnant twice by him.

Crystal Kawasaki – the pretty girlfriend of Larry. She is both beautiful and smart and Verva hires her to tutor Lovey and Cal. The first time Crystal gets pregnant, her mother takes her to Japan to abort the child. But she gets pregnant a second time and commits suicide because of the shame.

Aunt Helen – One of the Nariyoshi's neighbors. She is Verva's best friend, and exactly like Verva in that they both criticize Lovey without any remorse. Aunt Helen plays a minor role in the novel.

Katy – the other neighbor of the Nariyoshi family. She is a pregnant teenager that Lovey grows fond of throughout the novel. She teaches Lovey the birthing process, and allows Lovey to play with her baby son, Charlie, whenever she comes over.

"The Teacher" - an unnamed character. Lovey and Jerry love this teacher and it seems that the relationship they have with her is a bit inappropriate. They are constantly spending nights over at this teacher's house, and she is constantly teaching them about Hell fire and the Devil. Verva finds out and forbids Lovey to speak to her ever again.

Grandma - Hubert's mother. She lives on the island of Molokai and Verva sends Lovey to spend a few weeks with her after she keeps getting nightmares of the Devil and Hell from "The Teacher." Grandma teaches Lovey about the true love of God

Rays of the Rising Dawn - a YMCA girls club consisting of characters Traci Kihara, Gina Oshiro, Laura Murayama, Jodie Louie, Lori Shigemura, Rhonda Whang and Kandi Mitsuda. Lori has a bigger part in the novel than the rest of the girls because she has a constant crush on Jerry throughout their years in middle school.

== Major themes ==
The major themes of the novel that is discussed by Literary Critics include comparing a mother-daughter relationship with a father-daughter one, finding one's identity and the politics of Japanese Hawaiian culture in White America.

Father-daughter relationship: Asian-American writers usually follow the pattern of writing about mother-daughter relationships (20). Parents constantly want to live out their dreams through their children, particularly their children of the same sex. A son, to his father, should grow up just as strong and capable as his father in both the family and the working world. Likewise, a daughter should be as beautiful and ladylike as her mother. But Hubert wants to live his dreams through Lovey because he has no male heirs. And since Verva isn't willing to accept Lovey the way she is, her relationship with her daughter is stunted. Instead, Hubert accepts Lovey and tries to get her to also accept their Japanese heritage.

Identity: Micheline Soong states in her dissertation “Yosegire Buton, The ‘Crazy Patchwork Quilt: An Alternative Narrative Strategy for Three Local Japanese Women Writers of Hawaii,” that the narrative structure in Wild Meat produces racial and gender expectations of society and its different layers by the different voices of the narrator – Lovey's pre-adolescent voice and her adolescent teenager voice (135).

In her article, “Spreading Traditions: Lois-Ann Yamanaka’s Bildungsroman,” Serena Fusco claims that “by the end of [the] novel the main character, a teenage girl, has acquired a great deal of knowledge, which enables her to achieve self-awareness and get over the racial and sexual abuse perpetrated on her by the patriarchal society (197).

Politics of local Hawaiian culture in White America: Although the novel is narrated in both the Standard American English and Hawaiian Pidgin, Lovey and the rest of the characters speak Hawaiian Pidgin to each other. In his article “I wish you a land,” Rocio Davis says that the fact the Lovey speaks Pidgin is an example of how her character is separated from Western ideals (59). And by this separation, Lovey and the other characters in Wild Meat try to find their identities amidst political struggles (47).

== Publication history ==
- 1996, USA, Farrar Straus ISBN 0-374-29020-2, Pub date January 1996, Hardback

== Scholarly articles ==
- Chang, Juliana. “Interpreting Asian American Identity and Subjectivity.” Modern Fiction Studies 53.4 (2007): 867-75.
- Davis, Rocio G. “I wish you a land: Hawai’i short Story Cycles and aloha ‘aina.” Journal of American Studies 35.1 (2001): 47-64
- - - -. “Short Story Cycle and Hawai’i Bildungsroman: Writing Self, Place, and Family in Lois-Ann Yamanaka’s Wild Meat and the Bully Burgers.” Form and Transformation in Asian American Literature. Seattle: University of Washington Press (2005): 231-48.
- Fusco, Serena. “Spreading Traditions: Lois-Ann Yamanaka’s Bildungsroman.” Incoronata Inserra (2003): 197-226.
- Makino, Rie. “Localized Masculinities and Translocal Femininities: The Politics of Locations in the novels by Jessica Hagedorn, Lois-Ann Yamanaka, and Karen Tei Yamashita.” Diss. Arizona State University, 2006.
- Soong, Micheline M. “Yosegire Buton, The ‘Crazy’ Patchwork Quilt: An Alternative Narrative Strategy for Three Local Japanese Women Writers of Hawaii.” Diss. University of California in L.A., 1999.
- Wong, Sau-ling C, and Jeffrey J. Santa Ana. “Gender and Sexuality in Asian American Literature.” Signs 25.1 (1999): 171-226.
- Young, Morris. “Standard English and Student Bodies: Institutionalizing Race and Literacy in Hawai’i.” College English 64.4 (2002): 405-31.
