= Homebase (software company) =

American workforce management software company

- Founded: 2014; 12 years ago
- Founders: John Waldmann; Rushi Patel
- Headquarters: San Francisco, California, United States
- Website: joinhomebase.com

Homebase is an American workforce management software company headquartered in San Francisco, California. It provides workforce management tools primarily designed for small and medium-sized businesses that employ hourly workers.

== History ==
Homebase was founded in 2014 by John Waldmann and Rushi Patel. The company launched its scheduling and time-tracking platform in 2015, initially focusing on restaurants and retail businesses.

In 2016, Homebase raised $6 million in a series A funding round led by Khosla Ventures, with participation from Baseline Ventures and Cowboy Ventures, bringing the total capital raised to $8 million after a previous $2 million seed round.

In 2018, Homebase raised $20 million in a series B round led by Bain Capital Ventures. In July 2021, the company raised $71 million in a series C funding round led by GGV Capital, with participation from Bain Capital Ventures, Khosla Ventures, and other investors, including actor Matthew McConaughey. In April 2024, Homebase raised $60 million in a Series D funding round led by L Catterton and Emerson Collective, bringing its total funding to approximately $189 million.

During the COVID-19 pandemic, Homebase’s aggregated labor data was frequently used to track employment trends among small businesses. The data was cited by economists and reported in outlets such as Business Insider, NPR, and The New York Times.

In 2020, the company expanded its services by introducing payroll processing and earned wage access features. As of 2024, Homebase reported that its platform was used by approximately 2 million employees in the United States. The software is compatible with point-of-sale systems, accounting software, and payroll providers, and operates on a freemium model, offering basic services free of charge to single-location businesses, with paid tiers providing additional features and multi-location support.

== Awards and recognition ==
In 2023, Homebase received the Webby Award for Best HR & Employee Experience App. In 2024, the company was included in Forbes' list of America's Best Startup Employers. In 2025, Homebase was named one of the best employee scheduling software platforms by Zendesk.
