= Lois-Ann Yamanaka =

American poet and novelist from Hawaii (born 1961)

- Born: September 7, 1961 (age 64); Ho'olehua, Hawaii, U.S.
- Education: University of Hawaiʻi at Mānoa
- Occupation: Writer
- Spouse: John Inferrera
- Children: 1
- Writing career
- Notable works: Blu's Hanging, Wild Meat and the Bully Burgers
- Website: www.yamanakanaau.com

Lois-Ann Yamanaka (born September 7, 1961) is an American poet and novelist from Hawaiʻi. Many of her literary works are written in Hawaiian Pidgin, and some of her writing has dealt with controversial ethnic issues. In particular, her works confront themes of Asian American families and the local culture of Hawaiʻi.

== Biography ==
=== Early life ===
Lois-Ann Yamanaka was born on September 7, 1961, in Hoʻolehua on the island of Molokaʻi, Hawaiʻi. Yamanaka's parents, Harry and Jean Yamanaka, raised her and her four younger sisters in the sugarcane plantation town of Pahala on Hawaiʻi Island. She graduated from Hilo High School in 1979.

Both parents were school teachers, although her father later became a taxidermist. In 1983, she received a bachelor’s Degree, and in 1987 her master's degree, both in Education at the University of Hawaiʻi at Mānoa.

=== Career ===
She then went on to become an English and Language Arts resource teacher. Inspired by her own students' honesty demonstrated within poetry assignments, she began writing on her own.

She completed her first book, Saturday Night at the Pahala Theater, in 1993, which, was described as "'witty' and 'street-smart'" by Kiana Davenport in Women's Review of Books. The novel, "composed of four verse novellas narrated by working-class Hawaiian teenagers...explore[d] such subjects as ethnic identity, sexual awakening, drug use, and abusive relationships." Lawrence Chua, of the Voice Literary Supplement, wrote, "Her poetry is enabled by its elegant structure as much as its indolent diction. Saturday Night is not a lonely specimen of street life but a bold push at the borders of meaning and memory." Saturday Night at the Pahala Theater received several awards including the Pushcart Prize for poetry and later, the fiction award given by the Association for Asian American Studies.

In 1996, Yamanaka’s second book, Wild Meat and the Bully Burgers, again told in Pidgin, was a coming-of-age story made up of "a series of connected vignettes" that "examin[ed] larger issues of class and ethnicity". Lauren Belfer, of the New York Times Book Review, claimed the book to be "somewhat impenetrable" ... leaving "haunting images" in the minds of readers.

The next year, Yamanaka completed her third book, Blu’s Hanging 'which created even more of an uproar among Asian American critics. As the novel treated characters of both Filipino and Japanese American backgrounds within the Hawaiian landscape, she was given the Asian American Studies National Book Award in 1998; however, it was annulled almost immediately for its use of stereotypical language. Other known Asian American authors such as Amy Tan and Maxine Hong Kingston emerged in support of Yamanaka during the controversy. The work was deemed "a well-wrought but painful work" by Anna Quan Leon in the Library Journal. In defending herself, Yamanaka spoke out, telling Newsweek reporter Donna Foote that 'the distinction between the narrator and the author is not being made'".

Following Blu's Hanging, she published Heads by Harry, which dealt with gay sexuality and gender identity issues. The book received mixed reviews. "To some extent, Yamanaka has replaced racism with sexism and homophobia, 'safer topics'", concluded Nation reviewer Mindy Pennybacker. However, Michael Porter, of the New York Times Book Review applauded Yamanaka's efforts, stating that "[she] delivers a precise look at this vibrant 'Japanese-American' culture yet still speaks to anyone who has experienced the joy, security and small humiliations of family life."

Name Me Nobody was her fourth book geared towards adolescents. In illustrating the difficulties of young "teen hood" and the surrounding superficialities, the "'vignettes of young girlhood praised for their vivid images and expert distillation of language", related a Horn Book reviewer, "Yamanaka provides young adult literature with a fresh and welcome voice "noteworthy for its complexity and richness'."

In 2004, Silent Years, a short film based on Yamanaka's screenplay was released. The story of a thirteen-year-old girl who finds herself caught between her abusive uncle and older boyfriend, it is based on two poems from her collection Saturday Night at the Pahala Theatre and has been described as "brutal." The film was locally produced and directed by Honolulu native and University of Southern California film school graduate James Sereno.

In 2006, Yamanaka explored a spiritual approach in the novel, Behold the Many, set on the island of Oahu. In the book, a young woman is haunted by ghosts which ends in what a Kirkus Reviews contributor called a "beautifully tragic" outcome. Carol Haggas of Booklist wrote the book was a "richly atmospheric novel which paints a chillingly spectral portrait of souls tormented by love and guilt."

The April 2007 issue of Honolulu Magazine featured an excerpt from Yamanaka's upcoming novel, which had the working title of The Mother Mary Stories.

=== Personal life ===
As of 2009, Yamanaka is married to John Inferrera. They are both teachers. They have a son, John, Jr. and live in Honolulu, Hawaii. She is the co-owner of Na`au, a writing school.

=== As an author ===
"Lois-Ann Yamanaka's fiction focuses on young, working-class Japanese-Americans from Hawaii who struggle with such typical issues of adolescence as sexual development and peer acceptance while coming to terms with their cultural identity as the descendants of Japanese immigrant laborers."

"Yamanaka once said,' My work involves bringing to the page the utter complexity, ferocious beauty and sometimes absurdity of our ethnic relationships here in the islands. The way we language about each other and with each other in 'talk story' communities resonates in me with every word I write. I know this because as my friend Lisa Asagi says, 'It's impossible to ban the sound of memory'."

== Influences ==
Yamanaka has stated that her characters "know the sound of their own voice." She has drawn inspiration from her own experiences growing up amongst Hawaii life and culture, including the pidgin language. Yamanaka has attributed much of her work to the other authors who have inspired and influenced her, including: June Jordan, Ai, Thulani Davis, and Jessica Hagedorn; she describes them as major inspirations in terms of their use of voice in poetry.

She has described her experience of reading William Faulkner's The Sound and the Fury as humbling, and dubbed him a "genius." She also stated that she considered herself privileged to be categorized amongst other female Asian American writers such as Maxine Hong Kingston and Amy Tan.

== List of works ==
Among her principal works are:

- Saturday Night at the Pahala Theater, a book of poems written in Hawaiian Pidgin (1993)
- Wild Meat and the Bully Burgers (1996)
- Blu's Hanging (1997)
- Heads by Harry (1998)
- Name Me Nobody (2000)
- Father of the Four Passages (2001)
- The Heart's Language (2005)
- Behold the Many (2006)
- Snow Angel, Sand Angel (2022)

== Awards ==
- National Endowment for the Humanities grant, 1990
- Pushcart Prize for Poetry, 1993
- Carnegie Foundation Grant, 1994
- National Endowment for the Arts grant, 1994
- Pushcart Prize, 1994
- Rona Jaffe Foundation Writers' Award, 1996
- Lannan Literary Award, 1998
- Asian American Literary Award, 1998.
- American Book Award for Heads by Harry, 2000
- Anuenue Award for "Snow Angel, Sand Angel," 2024

== Other publications ==
- Yamanaka, Lois-Ann. "This Man Is an Island." The New York Times 18 January 2009, Opinion sec.: WK14. Print.
- Yamanaka, Lois-Ann. "Sunnyside Up." Chicago Review, Vol. 39, No. 3/4, A North Pacific Rim Reader (1993), pp. 175–178
