= Kayo Hatta =

American film director and activist (1958–2005)

- Born: March 18, 1958; Honolulu, Hawaii, U.S.
- Died: July 20, 2005 (aged 47); Encinitas, California, U.S.
- Education: Stanford University; University of California, Los Angeles (UCLA)
- Occupations: Film director, writer, activist
- Years active: 1988-2005
- Notable work: Picture Bride (1995); Fishbowl (2005).

Kayo Hatta (March 18, 1958 – July 20, 2005) was an American filmmaker, writer, and community activist. She directed and co-wrote the independent dramatic feature-length film Picture Bride, which won the Sundance Film Festival Audience Award in 1995 for Best Dramatic Film.

== Early life ==
Born in Honolulu, Hawaii, Hatta grew up in New York. She graduated from Stanford University and obtained a master's degree in film from UCLA.

== Film career ==
Picture Bride was an Official Selection at the 1994 Cannes Film Festival in the Un Certain Regard section, and received an Independent Spirit Award nomination for best first film. Distributed worldwide by Miramax, the film was praised for its authenticity (including extensive use of Hawaiian pidgin dialogue), and continues to be used in the curriculum at a number of Hawaii universities and schools.

While at UCLA, she began Picture Bride as a short film, but felt the material deserved to be feature length. Hatta describes the long process of developing and finding financing for the film on the DVD version of Picture Bride, released by Miramax Home Entertainment, in 2004. The DVD includes a "making of" documentary featuring an extensive interview with Hatta and cast members, archival historical footage, and behind-the-scenes clips from the movie set. She recounts how the film encountered many technical difficulties during production, and ran out of funding halfway through the shooting. However, the lead actress, Japanese star Youki Kudoh, was able to make phone calls from the set to convince a Japanese lingerie company, for whom she had modeled, to buy the Japanese rights to the film, and production was able to continue. Hatta was also able to enlist the participation of a number of other established actors, such as legendary Japanese actor Toshirō Mifune, and Tamlyn Tomita.

== Other projects ==
Hatta directed a number of short films, including Otemba ("Tomboy") (1988), a semi-autobiographical film which the Pan-Asian Filmmakers Foundation cited as one of three "Defining Moments in Asian American Cinema." Despite the success of Picture Bride, however, Hatta was unable to find studio financing for her subsequent feature film projects, which included a screen adaptation of Cynthia Kadohata's acclaimed novel The Floating World (1989), about the transient life of a young Japanese-American girl and her family following their release from the World War II internment camps. In 1999, Hatta narrowly lost out on the chance to direct the film adaptation of Snow Falling on Cedars, in which Youki Kudoh played a starring role.

As a collaborator, Hatta played key roles in the development and production of several independent films. She was co-producer of the award-winning film "The Olive Harvest" (2003), a romantic allegory of Palestinian culture today, directed by Hanna Elias. The film was the Palestine Authority's entry to the 2005 Academy Awards and the Golden Globe Awards, and was recognized at the 2003 Cairo International Film Festival as "Best Arabic Film." Hatta was cinematographer for Liz Cane's documentary film "Eager for Your Kisses: Love and Sex at 95" (2006) a portrait of the filmmaker's 95-year-old grandfather. She is also remembered for her involvement in social justice issues, and for her mentorship and support for emerging Asian American artists and filmmakers. She served on the Board of Directors for Independent Feature Projects/West "Project Involve" Mentorship Program and was assistant professor at UCLA's School of Theater, Film and Television and the Art Institute of Los Angeles, where she taught film directing and video production. She also served on the dramatic film jury at the 1998 Sundance Film Festival.

In 2005, Hatta completed work on Fishbowl, which she wrote, directed, and co-edited; the film is based on the novel, Wild Meat and the Bully Burgers, by Hawai'i author Lois-Ann Yamanaka. Hatta had intended to adapt the novel into a feature-length film but was unable to secure sufficient funding, so she decided to develop a 30-minute short film from a few key episodes in the book. The coming-of-age tale of plantation kids searching for a better life premiered at the San Francisco International Asian American Film Festival and aired nationally on PBS in March 2006. "Fishbowl" won the 2006 Academy of Motion Pictures Arts and Sciences Hawaii Film & Videomaker Award. In May 2007 the film also won a Regional Emmy Award (Northern California/Hawaii Area), in the category of Historical/Cultural – Program/Special.

== Awards ==
Over the course of her career, Hatta received numerous honors, including the Asian CineVision's Asian American Media Award for Outstanding Achievement and Contribution to Asian American Media; the Asian American Arts Foundation Golden Ring Award for Artistic Achievement; and the MANAA (Media Action Network for Asian Americans) Media Achievement Award. Her honors in Hawaii include the Hawaii Council of the City and County of Honolulu Certificate Honoring Women Filmmakers of Picture Bride for Outstanding Achievement in Film; a Hawaii State Senate Testimonial of Commendation; and a Hawaii State House of Representatives Testimonial of Commendation.

== Death and legacy ==
In July 2005, Hatta drowned in Encinitas, CA outside of San Diego. She did not live to see the reaction to her last work.

In October 2005, three months after her death, the State of Hawai`i posthumously recognized Hatta with its Film in Hawai’i Award at the Hawaii International Film Festival, "presented by the State of Hawai‘i to the film or television entity that has significantly contributed to promoting the local film industry."
