= Eric Byler =

American film director (born 1972)

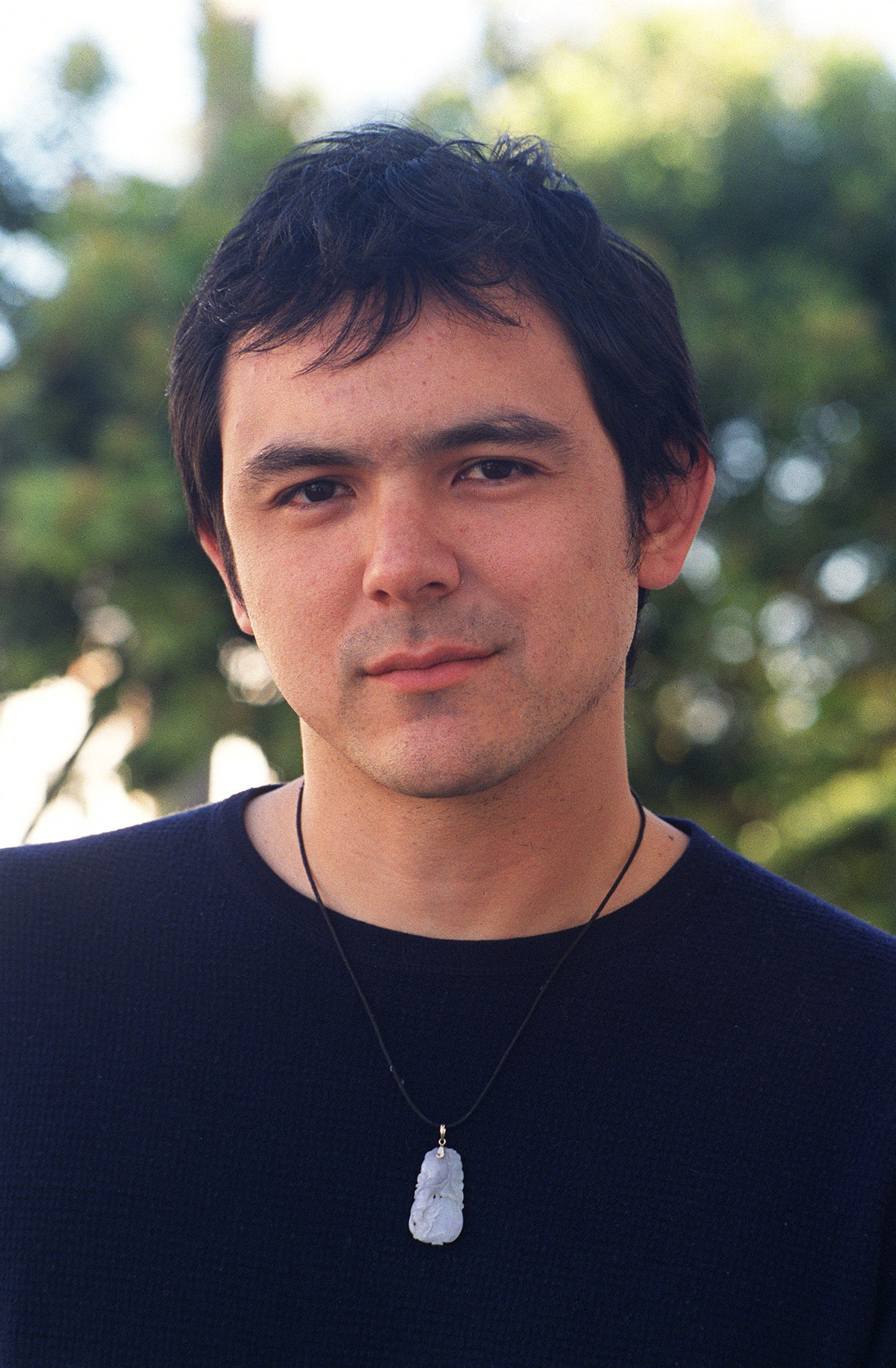
- Born: January 15, 1972 (age 54); United States
- Occupations: Film director, film producer, screenwriter, political activist

Eric Byler (born January 15, 1972) is an American film director, screenwriter and political activist.

== Personal life ==
Byler identifies as hapa biracial, born to a Chinese American mother and a white American father. He grew up in Virginia, Hawaii (where he attended Moanalua High School), and California. He graduated from Wesleyan University in 1994, majoring in film. He recently returned to the United States from Australia.

== Filmmaker ==
Byler's senior thesis film, Kenji's Faith, premiered at the Sundance Film Festival in 1995, went on to win six film festival awards, and was a regional finalist in the Student Academy Awards.

His first feature film, Charlotte Sometimes was nominated for two Independent Spirit Awards in 2003, including the John Cassavetes Award for Best Feature under $500,000, and a Best Supporting Actress award for Jacqueline Kim. The film was called "fascinating and illuminating" by film critic Roger Ebert, and won the Audience Award at South by Southwest Film Festival (SXSW), the Special Jury Award at the Florida Film Festival, and the Best Dramatic Feature at the San Diego Asian Film Festival. The film was distributed theatrically by Visionbox Media and Small Planet Pictures before being released on DVD.

Byler's second feature was the Charlotte Sometimes quasi-sequel, TRE which won the Special Jury Award at the 2007 San Francisco International Asian American Film Festival. TRE was distributed in theaters and on DVD (May 6, 2008) by Cinema Libre Studio.

His third feature, Americanese, was an adaptation of Shawn Wong's seminal Asian American novel, "American Knees." It won the Audience Award for Best Narrative Feature at SXSW, in addition to a Special Jury Prize for Outstanding Ensemble Cast, which includes Chris Tashima, Allison Sie, Joan Chen and Kelly Hu. It was acquired by IFC First Take.

He also directed the PBS / ITVS Television pilot, My Life Disoriented which starred Karin Anna Cheung.

His fourth feature film, 9500 Liberty (co-directed with Annabel Park), was a documentary about immigration and politics. "9500 Liberty" won the Breakthrough Filmmaker Award at the 2010 Phoenix Film Festival, the Jury Award for Best Documentary at the 2009 Charlotte Film Festival, and the Audience Award for Best Documentary at the 2009 St. Louis International Film Festival.

== Netroots organizer ==
In the fall of 2006, Byler volunteered in the Virginia U.S. Senate election. In response to incumbent Senator George Allen's use of the term "Macaca" on the campaign trail, referring to an Indian American student from the University of Virginia, Byler and others formed "Real Virginians for Webb", a group that campaigned for Allen's Democratic opponent, Jim Webb, among the state's Asian and Pacific Islander voters. The Democratic National Committee said that outreach efforts to these voters played a major role in Webb's victory, which he won by less than 9,000 votes.

In 2007, Byler volunteered and created YouTube videos for the "121 Coalition", a national grassroots organization that advocated passage of House Resolution 121, urging the Japanese government to acknowledge and apologize for military rape camps (comfort women) during World War II. The resolution passed on July 30, 2007.

During the 2008 presidential primaries, Byler volunteered as co-director (along with Warren Fu) of a music video of a song written and performed by artist Andres Useche, entitled "Si Se Puede Cambiar", in support of Barack Obama. The video was released on YouTube on February 22, 2008, and was viewed more than half a million times.

In February 2010, Byler and his partner Annabel Park co-founded the Coffee Party USA. Byler directed and edited the "How we Started" video for Coffee Party USA, the "National Kick-off" video, and other videos that appear on the Coffee Party YouTube channel. Coffee Party USA is coalition that began with a fan page on Facebook.

Byler also is a content producer for the interactive documentary "2010 Okinawa" exploring the controversy over U.S. bases in Okinawa. In 2013, Byler and Park teamed up on the web series Story of America (StoryofAmerica.org) which helped to launch both the Moral Monday movement and the "Walking Mayor" Adam O'Neal and the fight for rural healthcare (SaveourHospital.org). In 2015, Byler and comedian Will Rice launched the satirical news channel, One Percent News (OnePercentNews.com) based in Washington, DC.

== Filmography ==
- Kenji's Faith (1994) student thesis
- Charlotte Sometimes (2003) — director, writer, producer, editor
- My Life Disoriented (2006) — director, producer
- Americanese (2006) — director, screen-adaptation
- TRE (2008) — director, writer
- 9500 Liberty (2009) — director, writer, editor
- Story of America: Journey Into the Divide (working title, in post production)
- The Headless Klansman of Selma (2017)
