= List of Japanese Americans =

This is a list of Japanese Americans, including both original immigrants who obtained American citizenship and their American descendants, but not Japanese nationals living or working in the US. The list includes a brief description of their reason for notability.

== Arts and architecture ==
- Nina Akamu, artist
- Kichio Allen Arai (c. 1901–1966), architect
- Shusaku Arakawa (1936–2010), artist and architect
- Ruth Asawa (1926–2013), sculptor
- Norio Azuma (1928-2004), painter and serigraph artist
- Hideo Date (1907–2005), painter associated with Synchromism movement
- Isami Doi (1903–1965), printmaker and painter
- Paul Horiuchi (1906–1999), painter and collagist
- Miyoko Ito (1918–1983), painter and watercolorist
- Ben Kamihira (1924–2004), artist and teacher
- Jeff Matsuda, Emmy award-winning concept artist, comics artist, and animator
- John Matsudaira (1922–2007), painter
- George Matsumoto (1922–2016), architect and educator
- Jimmy Mirikitani (1920–2012), painter
- Luna H. Mitani, surrealist painter
- Robert Murase (1938–2005), world-renowned landscape architect
- Hashime Murayama (1879–1954), painter
- George Nakashima (1905–1990), Nisei, woodworker, architect, and furniture maker
- Hideo Noda (1908–1939), modernist painter and muralist
- Isamu Noguchi (1904–1988), artist, sculptor, designer
- Kenjiro Nomura (1896–1956), painter
- Chiura Obata (1885–1975), well-known artist and recipient of the Order of the Sacred Treasure, 5th Class, for promoting goodwill and cultural understanding between the United States and Japan
- Toshio Odate (born 1930), Japanese woodworker, sculptor, educator; born in Japan and moved to the United States in 1948.
- Arthur Okamura (1932–2009), California painter, illustrator and screen-printer associated with the San Francisco Renaissance
- Miné Okubo (1912–2001), Nisei, painter, author of Citizen 13660, her book documenting life during her confinement in the Japanese American internment
- Sueo Serisawa (1910–2004), Issei, Californian Impressionist artist
- Larry Shinoda, automotive designer noted for his work on the Corvette and the Boss 302 Mustang
- Toshiko Takaezu (1922–2011), born and died in Hawaii; ceramic artist and painter; known for closed pots and cylindrical vessels
- Adrian Tomine, graphic novelist (Shortcomings)
- George Tsutakawa (1910–1997), sculptor and painter
- Minoru Yamasaki (1912–1986), Nisei, architect, best known for the New York World Trade Center "Twin Towers"
- Ray Yoshida (1930–2009), painter and collagist, teacher at the School of the Art Institute of Chicago, and an important mentor of the Chicago Imagists

== Business and economics ==
- Barbara Adachi, principal at Deloitte
- Takeshi Amemiya (1935–2026), economist, Stanford professor
- Hiroaki Aoki, founder of Benihana
- Glen Fukushima, co-president and Representative Director, NCR Japan, Ltd., and former president, American Chamber of Commerce in Japan
- Francis Fukuyama, political economist and political scientist
- Glen Gondo, businessman and founder of the Japan Festival of Houston.
- Kelly Goto, American entrepreneur and author specializing in user experience design and contextual research.
- Robert Hamada, Edward Eagle Brown Distinguished Service Professor of Finance; former Dean of the University of Chicago Graduate School of Business
- Walter Hamada, film executive and producer
- Jon Ikeda, automobile designer, Vice President and Brand Officer of Acura
- Wayne Inouye, former president and CEO of Gateway, Inc.
- Roy Kusumoto, founder of Solectron
- Darren Kimura, founder of Sopogy, inventor of MicroCSP technology
- Nobu Matsuhisa, founder of Nobu and Matsuhisa
- Fujimatsu Moriguchi (1898–1962), founder of Uwajimaya
- Bill Naito (1925–1996), prominent businessman in Portland, Oregon
- Alice Sae Teshima Noda (1894–1964), businesswoman, dental hygienist, and beauty industry entrepreneur
- Scott Oki, former Senior Vice President of sales and marketing at Microsoft
- William Saito, founder of I/O Software, Inc. (acquired by Microsoft in 2004), venture capitalist and public policy consultant
- Richard Sakai, producer and President of Gracie Films
- Miyoko Schinner, founder Miyoko's Creamery, chef and cookbook author
- George Shima (1864–1926), first Japanese American millionaire
- Gary A. Tanaka, financier
- Dave Tatsuno, businessman and filmmaker
- Kevin Tsujihara, CEO, Warner Brothers
- Ken Uston, blackjack player, strategist, and author

== Entertainment ==
- Keiko Agena, actress (Gilmore Girls TV series)
- Jhene Aiko, singer/songwriter, maternal grandfather is Japanese-American (Nisei)
- Anna Akana, YouTube celebrity, actress/comedian, filmmaker, author
- Asa Akira, pornographic actress and director
- Toshiko Akiyoshi, Shin-Issei, musician, jazz pianist, composer, arranger and big band leader
- Shuko Akune, actress
- Daniella Alonso, actress; father is of part Japanese descent
- Sally Amaki, singer and voice actress, member of idol group 22/7
- Ella Anderson, actress; is of 1/8th Japanese descent on her father's side
- Devon Aoki, model and actress; half Japanese
- Steve Aoki, house musician and record producer
- Tsuru Aoki (1892–1961), Issei, actress
- Gregg Araki, film director
- Reiko Aylesworth, actress known for portraying Michelle Dessler in TV Series 24; grandmother is Japanese
- Nadia Azzi, pianist
- Darren Barnet, actor
- Nichole Bloom, actress and model; mother is Japanese
- Kaylee Bryant, actress on Legacies (Okinawan via her grandfather)
- Kenji Bunch, composer and violist
- Artt Butler, voice actor; half Japanese
- Charlie Bushnell, actor; is of Costa Rican, Japanese and Irish descent
- Dean Cain, actor, best known for playing the dual role of Clark Kent/Superman in the TV series Lois & Clark: The New Adventures of Superman; paternal grandfather is of Japanese descent
- Asia Carrera, former pornographic actress; half Japanese
- Louis Ozawa Changchien, actor; half Japanese
- China Chow, actress and model (daughter of Tina Chow); 1/4 Japanese.
- Tina Chow, model and jewelry designer who was considered an influential fashion icon of the 1970s and 1980s; mother is Japanese mother
- Mark Dacascos, actor and martial artist; biological mother, Moriko McVey-Murray, is half Japanese.
- Ian Anthony Dale, actor (Mr. 3000); mother is Japanese, father is French-English
- Romi Dames, actress, voice artist
- Lynn Yamada "Lynja" Davis (1956–2024), chef and TikTok celebrity
- Marié Digby, singer-songwriter, guitarist, pianist; half Japanese
- DJ Heavygrinder, disc jockey; mother is Japanese
- Yvonne Elliman, singer-songwriter; mother is Japanese
- Lieko English, model and actress. She is known for being Playboy's Playmate of the Month in 1971.
- Maya Erskine, film actress; half Japanese
- Takayo Fischer, Nisei, actress
- Tak Fujimoto, Nisei, cinematographer of many Hollywood films, including The Silence of the Lambs and Ferris Bueller's Day Off
- Jun Fujita (1888–1963), Issei, silent movie actor, Essanay Studios of Chicago
- Koichi Fukuda, Static-X band member
- Karen Fukuhara, actress
- Cary Fukunaga, Emmy-award-winning filmmaker and writer known for directing & executive producing the first season of HBO series True Detective and for directing the 2021 James Bond film No Time to Die (father is 3rd generation Japanese American)
- Umi Garrett, pianist
- Rigel Gemini, music artist; one quarter Japanese
- Kimiko Glenn, actress and singer, known for portraying "Brook Soso" in the Netflix TV series Orange Is the New Black
- Alésia Glidewell, web series director, producer and voice actress. Known for providing face and body models in Portal and Portal 2, Left 4 Dead and other video games; mother is Japanese
- Griffin Gluck, film & TV actor; paternal grandmother is Japanese
- Tom Gorai, film producer
- Midori Gotō, classical violinist and recipient of the Avery Fisher Prize
- Ryu Goto, violinist
- Kina Grannis, singer-songwriter, guitarist and a YouTuber; mother is Japanese
- Conan Gray, singer-songwriter and social media personality; mother is Japanese
- Alice Greczyn, actress and model; part Japanese
- Ann Harada, actress (musical Avenue Q)
- Teri Harrison, model and actress. Playboy's Playmate of the Month in October 2002; mother is half-Japanese
- Janet Hatta, actress; mother is Japanese
- Kayo Hatta (1958–2005), filmmaker (Sundance Award winner Picture Bride)
- Chris Hart, singer, songwriter, and producer
- Sessue Hayakawa (1886–1973), Issei, Academy Award-nominated actor
- Matt Heafy, lead vocalist of band Trivium; mother is Japanese
- Marie Helvin, fashion model; mother is Japanese
- Don Henrie, self-proclaimed vampire and an "Alt" on the short-lived Sci Fi Channel series Mad Mad House; half Japanese
- Ryan Higa, YouTube celebrity, actor, comedian, and producer
- Judith Hill, singer-songwriter, provided backing vocals for such artists as Michael Jackson, Stevie Wonder and Josh Groban; mother is Japanese
- Satoshi Hino, voice actor
- Kazu Hiro, Academy Award-winning special make-up effects artist and visual artist
- Remington Hoffman, actor; great-grandparents are Japanese
- James Holzhauer, Jeopardy! contestant and professional sports gambler; grandmother born in Japan
- Shizuko Hoshi, Shin-Issei (Japanese-born), actress
- Glenn Howerton, actor, producer, screenwriter, and director, best known as Dennis Reynolds on the TV series It's Always Sunny in Philadelphia; born in Japan to American parents
- James Iha, guitarist for The Smashing Pumpkins and A Perfect Circle
- Suzee Ikeda, singer who was the first Asian-American solo artist at Motown. Best known for her work "behind the scenes" at Motown with such acts as Michael Jackson and The Temptations; father is Japanese
- Jeff Imada, actor, stuntman, stunt coordinator
- Grant Imahara (1970–2020), Yonsei, builder and host on MythBusters TV series on Discovery Channel
- Carrie Ann Inaba, dancer, actress
- Joe Inoue, pop and rock musician
- Brittany Ishibashi, TV and film actress
- Tatsuya Ishida, creator of the webcomic Sinfest
- Miki Ishikawa, actress
- Miyuki Melody Ishikawa, singer and former host of NHK World TV music show J-Melo
- Maryanne Ito, soul singer, songwriter, and performer
- Robert Ito, Nisei (Canadian-born), actor, best known as "Dr. Sam Fujiyama" on the TV series Quincy, M.E.
- Yuna Ito, singer and actress, also of half Korean descent
- Micah Iverson, musician and contestant from The Voice season 18; born and raised in Japan, later moved to the United States
- Mila J, singer, rapper, dancer; sister of Jhene Aiko
- Jadagrace, actress, dancer, and singer. She appeared in the 2009 film, Terminator Salvation; mother is Japanese-American
- Jero, born Jerome Charles White, Jr., enka singer in Japan; grandmother was Japanese
- Ben Jorgensen, musician, best known as the lead singer and guitarist of the rock band Armor for Sleep; part Japanese
- Rodney Kageyama (1941–2018), Nisei, actor
- Stacy Kamano, TV actress known for her role on Baywatch; father is Japanese
- Janice Kawaye, voice actress
- Candace Kita, film and TV actress
- Hayley Kiyoko, actress, singer
- Ariane Koizumi, film actress
- Christina Kokubo, film and TV actress
- Hokuto Konishi, dancer and b-boy, member of the season three-winning crew on America's Best Dance Crew
- Mia Korf, film and TV actress; mother is Japanese
- Kane Kosugi, actor and martial artist, son of Sho Kosugi
- Sho Kosugi, Shin-Issei (Japanese-born), actor and martial artist
- Shin Koyamada, Shin-Issei (Japanese-born), actor, producer, philanthropist, and martial artist
- Louisa Krause, film, stage, and television actress; father is of half-Japanese descent (from Okinawa, Japan)
- Emily Kuroda, actress (Gilmore Girls TV series)
- Karyn Kusama, director
- Clyde Kusatsu, actor
- George Kuwa (1885–1931), actor
- Bob Kuwahara, animator for Walt Disney and Terrytoons; created Hashimoto-san series
- Dan Kwong, performance artist, writer, playwright (Be Like Water)
- Jeff LaBar, guitarist of Cinderella
- Jake E. Lee, heavy metal guitarist, known for his work with Ozzy Osbourne and in his own band Badlands
- Sean Ono Lennon, Hapa Nisei, musician, son of John Lennon and Yoko Ono
- James Hiroyuki Liao, actor; half Japanese
- Lotus Long actress who began her acting career in Hollywood movies in the 1920s; father was of Japanese descent
- Olivia Lufkin, singer-songwriter
- Adelle Lutz, actress, costume designer, performance artist and sculptor; sister of Tina Chow; mother is Japanese
- Mackenyu, actor
- Ally Maki, film and TV actress
- Mako (1933–2006), Shin-Issei (Japanese-born), actor, Academy Award nominee for Best Actor in a Supporting Role (The Sand Pebbles), Tony Award nominee for Best Actor (Pacific Overtures), founder of East West Players
- Bryan Mantia, contemporary rock drummer and composer who was a drummer for bands such as Primus, Guns N' Roses, Praxis, and Godflesh; mother is Japanese-American
- Lily Mariye, actress (ER), filmmaker
- Money Mark, producer and musician, best known for his collaborations with the Beastie Boys from 1992 until 2011; father is Japanese-Hawaiian
- Keiko Matsui, Shin-Issei (Japanese-born), jazz musician
- Kent Matsuoka, Nisei producer and location manager
- Nobu McCarthy (1934–2002), Kibei (Canadian-born), actress (Farewell to Manzanar, Wake Me When It's Over, Walk Like A Dragon)
- Linda McDonald, drummer of the all-female tribute band The Iron Maidens; she is of Irish and Japanese descent
- Elle McLemore, stage & TV actress; 1/4 Japanese
- Meiko, L.A.-based singer-songwriter; one-quarter Japanese on her mother's side
- Emi Meyer, jazz pianist and singer-songwriter; mother is Japanese
- Anne Akiko Meyers, classical violinist
- Derek Mio, Yonsei, actor (TV series Greek, Day One)
- Mitski, singer-songwriter and musician; mother is Japanese
- Kim Miyori, actress (St. Elsewhere TV series)
- Diane Mizota, dancer, actress, and TV personality
- Pat Morita (1932–2005), Nisei, Academy Award-nominated actor and comedian
- Hiro Murai, Director (Atlanta, "This Is America" music video)
- Glen Murakami, animator, director, producer
- Doris Muramatsu, Girlyman band member
- Alan Muraoka, actor and theatre director who plays the current owner of Hooper's Store on Sesame Street
- Mina Myōi, singer, dancer, and a member of South Korean girl group Twice
- Kent Nagano, conductor, Los Angeles Symphony
- Robert A. Nakamura, filmmaker, co-founder of Visual Communications, teacher
- Suzy Nakamura, Sansei, actress
- Desmond Nakano, Sansei, film director (White Man's Burden, American Pastime) and screenwriter (Last Exit to Brooklyn, American Me, White Man's Burden, American Pastime)
- Ken Narasaki, Sansei, actor, playwright
- Hiro Narita, Shin-Issei (Japanese-born), cinematographer
- Lane Nishikawa, Sansei, actor, filmmaker, playwright and performance artist
- Kevin "KevNish" Nishimura, musician, member of the Far East Movement (half Japanese)
- Trina Nishimura, voice actress
- George Nozuka, R&B singer
- Justin Nozuka, singer, younger brother of George Nozuka
- Philip Nozuka, actor, younger brother of George Nozuka
- Sophie Tamiko Oda (1991–), child actress
- Masi Oka, Shin-Issei (Japanese-born), Golden Globe-nominated television actor (Heroes)
- Daryn Okada, cinematographer, current president of American Society of Cinematographers
- Steven Okazaki, Sansei, Academy Award-winning documentary filmmaker
- Amy Okuda, film and TV actress
- Ryo Okumoto, Spock's Beard band member
- Yuji Okumoto, Sansei, actor
- Lisa Onodera, film producer (Picture Bride, The Debut, Americanese)
- Sono Osato (1919–2018), dancer and actress; father is Japanese
- Yuko Oshima, idol, actress, and a former member of AKB48; mother is half Japanese
- Ken and Miye Ota, champion ballroom dancers, martial artists (Aikido and Judo)
- Seiji Ozawa (1935–2024), conductor, director of the Boston Symphony Orchestra from 1973 to 2002
- Mizuo Peck, actress; mother is Japanese
- Lumi Pollack, actress; is of Japanese, Colombian and Jewish descent
- Ryan Potter, actor (Big Hero 6 and Big Hero 6: The Series) and martial artist
- Douglas Robb, lead singer of Hoobastank; mother is Japanese
- Grace Rolek, actress, voice actress and singer; 1/4 Japanese
- Rubi Rose, rapper, songwriter and model; paternal grandmother is Japanese
- Bianca Ryan, winner of America's Got Talent; mother is half Japanese
- Nick Sakai, actor and producer
- Stan Sakai, cartoonist, creator of Usagi Yojimbo comic series
- Harold Sakata (1920–1982), Nisei, actor ("Odd Job" from James Bond film Goldfinger) and wrestler (see also "Sports" section)
- Tony Sano, game show host
- Reiko Sato (1931–1981), Nisei, dancer and actress (Flower Drum Song, The Ugly American)
- Kylee Saunders, singer based in Japan
- Lisa Marie Scott, model and actress, known for her appearances in Playboy magazine and for being Playboy's Playmate of the Month in 1995; mother is Japanese from Okinawa
- Toshi Seeger, filmmaker and environmental activist, founder of the Clearwater Festival
- James Shigeta (1929–2014), Sansei, actor (Bridge to the Sun, Crimson Kimono, Flower Drum Song, Walk Like a Dragon) and American popular standards singer
- Laura Shigihara, composer and singer-songwriter, known for composing the Plants vs. Zombies soundtrack
- Tak Shindo, musician, composer and arranger. He was one of the prominent artists in the exotica music genre during the late 1950s and early 1960s.
- Jake Shimabukuro, ukulele virtuoso
- Jenny Shimizu, model and actress
- Yuki Shimoda (1921–1981), Nisei, actor
- Sab Shimono, actor
- Mike Shinoda, Linkin Park band member; father is Japanese
- Kimora Lee Simmons, fashion model and fashion designer (according to Simmons, her mother Joanne "Kyoko" Kimora is of fully Japanese descent, and was a war refugee who moved to Korea)
- Dan Smyers, singer-songwriter, member of the country music duo Dan + Shay; maternal grandmother is Japanese
- Jack Soo (Goro Suzuki) (1916–1979), Nisei, actor (Flower Drum Song, portrayed Detective Sergeant Nick Yemana in Barney Miller TV series)
- Joanna Sotomura, TV and film actress
- Chrishell Stause, TV actress; 1/4 Japanese
- Stephanie, singer; half Japanese
- Booboo Stewart, actor; mother is part Japanese
- Aya Sumika, former actress; mother is Japanese
- Dave Suzuki, death metal multi-instrumentalist, best known for his work as the guitarist, lyricist, bassist and drummer for Vital Remains and as a touring guitarist with Deicide
- Pat Suzuki, Nisei, American popular standards singer and actress (Flower Drum Song Original Broadway Cast)
- Shoji Tabuchi (1944–2023), Shin-Issei (Japanese-born), famous fiddler
- Jimmy Taenaka, film and TV actor
- Charlie Tagawa, musical entertainer, banjoist. He was regarded as one of the best contemporary banjo players and arguably one of the all-time best.
- Cary-Hiroyuki Tagawa (1950-2025), Shin-Issei (Japanese-born), actor
- Kobe Tai, porn star; half Taiwanese and half Japanese, Very Bad Things.
- Rea Tajiri, Sansei, filmmaker
- Miiko Taka (1925–2023), Nisei, actress, starred opposite Marlon Brando in Sayonara
- Iwao Takamoto (1925–2007), Nisei, animator/producer for Hanna Barbera, creator of Scooby-Doo
- Cyril Takayama, illusionist
- George Takei, Nisei, actor, "Sulu" from Star Trek TV series and films
- Sara Tanaka, actress
- Chris Tashima, Sansei, actor, Academy Award-winning director (Visas and Virtue)
- Brian Tee, actor
- Teppei Teranishi, Thrice band member
- Mayuka Thaïs, singer-songwriter, artist, actress, voice over artist, art educator, and edutainer; father was Japanese
- Brian Tochi, actor; Sansei
- Mika Todd, singer and former member of the Hello! Project groups Coconuts Musume and Minimoni; mother is Japanese
- Mia Doi Todd, singer-songwriter; Mother is of Japanese descent
- Tamlyn Tomita, actress; Sansei on father's side and mother is Japanese/Filipina
- Jerry Tondo, actor
- Daisuke Tsuji, actor (The Man in the High Castle, Ghost of Tsushima)
- Uffie, singer, songwriter, rapper, DJ, and fashion designer; mother is Japanese
- Miyoshi Umeki (1929–2007), Shin-Issei, Academy Award-winning actress (Sayonara) and American popular standards singer
- Michael Toshiyuki Uno, Academy Award-nominated director
- Hikaru Utada, singer/songwriter. Multi-million selling Japanese pop music star. Topped Billboard Club chart with "Devil Inside" in 2004
- Gedde Watanabe, Sansei, actor, Long Duk Dong in Sixteen Candles
- Daniel Kamihira White, magician; mother is Japanese
- Don "the Dragon" Wilson, Hapa, actor in Hollywood action films, mother is Japanese (see also Sports below)
- Linda Wong, pornographic actress
- Lena Yada, model, actress, professional tandem surfer and a professional wrestler who is known for her time in World Wrestling Entertainment (WWE)
- Rachael Yamagata, Hapa, Yonsei, singer, songwriter, pianist; Sansei father and German-Italian mother
- Hiro Yamamoto, original bass player for Soundgarden
- Linda Yamamoto, actress; mother is Japanese
- Iris Yamashita, Academy Award-nominated screenwriter (Letters from Iwo Jima)
- Sotaro Yasuda, actor
- Patti Yasutake (1953–2024), actress who played "Nurse Alyssa Ogawa" on Star Trek: The Next Generation TV series
- Jenny Yokobori, voice actress born to Japanese parents

== History ==
- Kwan-Ichi Asakawa (1873–1948), historian, professor at Yale
- Yamato Ichihashi (1878–1963), one of the first Asian academics in the US
- Yuji Ichioka (1936–2002), historian, coined the term "Asian American"
- Akira Iriye (1934–2026), historian, professor at Harvard
- Shunzo Sakamaki (1906–1973), historian, professor at University of Hawaii at Manoa
- Ronald Takaki (1939–2009), historian, University of California, Berkeley professor

== Literature and poetry ==
- Emma Mieko Candon, American novelist
- Jun Fujita (1888–1963), Issei, poet, wrote the first American Tanka poetry book in 1923, TANKA: Poems in Exile
- Dale Furutani (1941–), novelist
- Philip Kan Gotanda (1951–), Sansei, playwright
- Jeanne Wakatsuki Houston (1934–2024), Nisei, novelist, author of Farewell to Manzanar
- Naomi Iizuka (1965–), Shin-Issei (Japanese-born), playwright
- Ayako Ishigaki (1903–1996), Issei, journalist and memoirist
- Lawson Fusao Inada (1938–), Nisei, poet and former poet laureate of the state of Oregon
- Cynthia Kadohata (1956–), novelist; winner of the Newbery Medal (2005) and National Book Award for Young People's Literature (2013)
- Hiroshi Kashiwagi (1922–2019), Nisei, poet, playwright, actor
- Soji Kashiwagi (1962–), Sansei, playwright and producer (Grateful Crane Ensemble theater company)
- Sarah Kay (1988–), known for her spoken word poetry. Her mother is a 4th generation Japanese-American (Yonsei)
- Katie Kitamura (1979–), novelist, journalist, and art critic.
- Janice Mirikitani (1941–2021), former poet laureate for San Francisco
- David Mura (1952–), poet, memoirist, and novelist
- John Okada (1923–1971), author of No-No Boy
- Julie Otsuka (1962–), novelist
- Ruth Ozeki (1956–), novelist
- Albert Saijo (1926–2011), poet
- Monica Sone (1919–2011), author of the autobiographical Nisei Daughter
- Etsu Inagaki Sugimoto (1874–1950), memoirist
- Toyo Suyemoto (1916–2003), poet, memoirist, and librarian
- Yoshiko Uchida (1921–1992), Nisei, author
- Michi Weglyn (1926–1999), author and recipient of the Anisfield-Wolf Book Award in 1977
- Hisaye Yamamoto (1921–2011), award-winning short story writer
- Karen Tei Yamashita (1951–), author and playwright, recipient of the 2021 National Book Foundation's Medal for Distinguished Contribution to American Letters
- Wakako Yamauchi (1924–2018), Nisei, playwright
- Taro Yashima (1908–1994), author and illustrator; recipient of the 1955 Children's Book Award

== Food ==
- Rocky Aoki, founder of teppanyaki restaurant chain Benihana
- Nobu Matsuhisa, sushi chef and restaurateur known for blending Japanese dishes with Peruvian ingredients
- Masako Morishita, chef and former NFL Cheerleader
- Niki Nakayama, kaiseki chef and Michelin-starred restaurateur
- Kazunori Nozawa, sushi chef and restaurateur
- Toni Okamoto, vegan/Plant-based cookbook author and food blogger
- Alan Wong, chef and restaurateur known for his contributions to Hawaiian cuisine
- Roy Yamaguchi, chef and restaurateur known for his contributions to Hawaiian cuisine

== News/media ==
- Ann Curry, former network anchor and correspondent for NBC News and The Today Show
- Dina Eastwood, anchor
- Naoko Funayama, Japanese-American Sports Castcaster,
- Jun Fujita (1888–1963), Issei, photographer/photojournalist
- Joseph Heco (1837–1897), fisherman and writer, first to publish Japanese language newspaper
- Bill Hosokawa (1915–2007), Nisei, Denver Post journalist, columnist, editor, and author
- Michiko Kakutani, Pulitzer Prize-winning literary critic and former chief book critic for The New York Times
- Ken Kashiwahara – network news anchor, Emmy-winning television journalist* Ken Kashiwahara – first Asian American network news anchor, Emmy-winning television journalist
- Fred Katayama, anchor, Reuters Television, New York
- Guy Kawasaki, author, Apple evangelist
- Sachi Koto, former CNN news anchor
- Lori Matsukawa, former evening news anchor, KING5, Seattle
- Rob Mayeda, NBC Bay Area Weather Plus meteorologist
- Denise Nakano, anchor, WCAU NBC 10, Philadelphia
- Ellen Nakashima, journalist, The Washington Post
- Kent Ninomiya, anchor, reporter and news executive
- James Omura (1912–1994), Nisei, journalist, editor, and civil rights leader
- David Ono, anchor, ABC7, Los Angeles
- Roxana Saberi, reporter, mother is an immigrant from Japan
- James Sakamoto (1903–1955), Nisei, journalist, columnist, editor, and boxer, founded first English-language Japanese American newspaper
- Scott Sassa, former president, NBC West Coast
- Tricia Takasugi, anchor, KTTV Fox 11, Los Angeles
- Iva Toguri (1916–2006), Nisei, radio broadcaster nicknamed "Tokyo Rose"
- Tritia Toyota, former anchor, KNBC and KCBS, Los Angeles

== Martial arts ==
- Taky Kimura (1924–2021), martial arts practitioner and instructor certified by Bruce Lee to teach Jun Fan Gung Fu or Jeet Kune Do
- Henry Okamura (1924–2005), Judoka
- Toshihiro Oshiro, martial arts master and instructor from Haneji, Okinawa; a founder of the Ryukyu Bujutsu Kenkyu Doyukai
- Don "The Dragon" Wilson, former world champion kickboxer and action movie star

== Military ==
- Thomas P. Bostick (born 1956), lieutenant general, U. S. Army Chief of Engineers
- Barney F. Hajiro (1916–2011), Medal of Honor recipient in World War II
- Harry B. Harris Jr., admiral (four stars) United States Navy, commander of the United States Pacific Fleet
- Mikio Hasemoto (1916–1943), Medal of Honor recipient in World War II
- Joe Hayashi (1920–1945), Medal of Honor recipient in World War II
- Shizuya Hayashi (1917–2008), Medal of Honor recipient in World War II
- Chiyoki Ikeda (1920–1960), CIA officer, recipient of Bronze Star in China in World War II
- Daniel Inouye (1924–2012), former senator from Hawaii, Medal of Honor recipient World War II
- Theodore Kanamine (1929–2023), a United States Army brigadier general
- Terry Teruo Kawamura (1949–1969), Medal of Honor recipient, sergeant first class in the Vietnam War
- Yeiki Kobashigawa (1920–2005), Medal of Honor recipient in World War II
- Robert T. Kuroda (1922–1944), Medal of Honor recipient in World War II
- Ben Kuroki (1917–2015), the only Japanese-American Army Air Force pilot to fly combat missions in the Pacific theater in World War II
- Susan K. Mashiko, major general (two stars) United States Air Force, November 2009–present
- Roy Matsumoto (1913–2014), master sergeant, U.S. Army; member of Merrill's Marauders; inductee of the U.S. Army Rangers Hall of Fame and the Military Intelligence Corps Hall of Fame
- Hiroshi Miyamura (1925–2022), Medal of Honor recipient, corporal in Korean War
- Kenneth P. Moritsugu, former acting Surgeon General of the United States; rear admiral, USPHS
- Kaoru Moto (1917–1992), Medal of Honor recipient in World War II
- James Mukoyama, United States Army major general
- Sadao Munemori (1922–1945), Medal of Honor recipient, private first class in World War II
- Kiyoshi K. Muranaga (1922–1944), Medal of Honor recipient in World War II
- Michael K. Nagata, United States Army lieutenant general
- Masato Nakae (1917–1998), Medal of Honor recipient in World War II
- Wataru Nakamura (1921-1951), Medal of Honor recipient in Korean War
- Shinyei Nakamine (1920–1944), Medal of Honor recipient in World War II
- William K. Nakamura (1922–1944), Medal of Honor recipient, private first class in World War II
- Paul M. Nakasone (born 1963), U.S. Army four-star general, 3rd commander of the United States Cyber Command and 18th Director of the National Security Agency
- Joe M. Nishimoto (1920–1944), Medal of Honor recipient in World War II
- Allan M. Ohata (1918–1977), Medal of Honor recipient in World War II
- Vincent Okamoto (1943–2020), highly decorated veteran of the Vietnam War
- James K. Okubo (1920–1967), Medal of Honor recipient in World War II
- Yukio Okutsu (1921–2003), Medal of Honor recipient in World War II
- Allen K. Ono, first Japanese-American lieutenant general
- Frank H. Ono (1923–1980), Medal of Honor recipient in World War II
- Kazuo Otani (1918–1944), Medal of Honor recipient in World War II
- George T. Sakato (1921–2015), Medal of Honor recipient in World War II
- Eric Shinseki, United States Army general, Army Chief of Staff (1999–2003), Secretary of Veterans Affairs (2009–2014)
- Francis Takemoto (1912–2002), first Japanese-American general officer in the U.S. military
- Ted T. Tanouye (1919–1944), Medal of Honor recipient in World War II
- Ehren Watada, first commissioned officer in the U.S. armed forces to publicly refuse deployment to Iraq, discharged "under Other-Than-Honorable-Conditions" in 2009
- Bruce Yamashita, worked to expose racial discrimination in the United States Marine Corps
- Rodney James Takashi Yano (1943–1969), Medal of Honor recipient, sergeant first class in the Vietnam War

== Politics, law and government ==
- Sanji Abe (1895–1982), first Japanese American in the Hawaii Territorial Senate (1940–1943)
- Jeff Adachi (1959–2019), elected Public Defender of San Francisco, a pension reform advocate, and a director of multiple films.
- John Aiso [1909–1987), first Japanese American judge in the continental U.S. (1957)
- Richard Aoki (1938–2009), civil rights activist and co-founder of the Black Panther Party
- George Ariyoshi (1926–2026), first Asian American governor of a U.S. state (Hawaii)
- Alexander Arvizu (born 1958), US diplomat, first Japanese American Ambassador of United States (Albania) from 2010 to 2015
- Nelson Doi (1922–2015), former Lieutenant Governor of Hawaii
- Kathryn Doi Todd, first female Asian American judge in the U.S. (1978)
- Sue Kunitomi Embrey (1923–2006), co-founder of the Manzanar Committee who worked to gain National Historic Site status for the former concentration camp
- Henry Hajimu Fujii, civic leader, Order of the Rising Sun recipient, Idaho
- Warren Furutani, California State Assemblyman, 55th District
- Colleen Hanabusa (1951–2026), former Congresswoman from Hawaii
- Terry Hara, retired deputy chief of the Los Angeles Police Department
- Bruce Harrell, Acting Mayor of Seattle in 2017 and the mayor of Seattle from 2022 to 2026
- Bob Hasegawa, Member, House of Representatives, Washington State Legislature
- S. I. Hayakawa (1906–1992), Canadian, former Senator from California and linguistics scholar
- Aiko Herzig-Yoshinaga (1924–2018), civil rights activist and lead researcher of the Commission on Wartime Relocation and Internment of Civilians
- Gordon Hirabayashi (1918–2012), plaintiff in Hirabayashi v. United States, which challenged Japanese American internment during World War II
- Mazie Hirono, former lieutenant governor of Hawaii, currently Senator from Hawaii
- Mike Honda, former Congressman from California
- Paul Igasaki, former vice-chair and Chair of the U.S. Equal Employment Opportunity Commission
- David Ige, former governor of Hawaii from 2014 to 2022
- Daniel Inouye (1924–2012), former Senator from Hawaii, Medal of Honor recipient, former President pro tempore of the United States Senate, and third in the United States presidential line of succession
- Adena Ishii, mayor of Berkeley
- Lance Ito, judge, presided over O. J. Simpson criminal trial
- Jani Iwamoto, Democratic Utah Senator
- Lincoln Kanai (1908–1982), plaintiff in ex parte Kanai, which challenged the constitutionality of the WWII incarceration
- James Kanno (1925–2017), mayor of Fountain Valley, California from 1957 to 1962
- Scott Kawasaki, member of the Alaska State Senate, former member of the Alaska House of Representatives
- Jean King (1925–2013), former Lieutenant Governor of Hawaii and member of the Hawaii Senate and Hawaii House of Representatives
- Yuri Kochiyama (1921–2014), Japanese American civil rights activist and friend of Malcolm X
- Russell S. Kokubun, member, Hawaii State Senate
- Fred Korematsu (1919–2005), Medal of Freedom recipient who argued against the internment
- Aki Kurose (1925–2008), activist and educator who helped establish Seattle's first Head Start Program
- Masaji Marumoto (1906–1995), first Asian American territorial court justice (1956)
- Mari Matsuda, first tenured Asian American female law professor in the United States
- Kinjiro Matsudaira (1885–1963), mayor of Edmonston, Maryland in 1927 and 1943
- Doris Matsui, Congresswoman from California and widow of Robert Matsui
- Robert Matsui (1941–2005), late Congressman from California and former chair of the Democratic Congressional Campaign Committee
- Spark Matsunaga (1916–1990), US Senator from Hawaii
- Stan Matsunaka, Colorado State Senator
- Norman Mineta (1931–2022), Mayor of San Jose, California, Congressman from California, Secretary of Commerce, Secretary of Transportation
- Patsy Takemoto Mink (1927–2002), first Asian American Congresswoman, Hawaii
- Tyson Miyake, member, Hawaii State House
- Hermina Morita, member, House of Representatives, Hawaii State Legislature
- Kenneth P. Moritsugu, United States Surgeon General (acting) from 2006 to 2007
- Al Muratsuchi, member of the California State Assembly
- Alan Nakanishi, California State Assemblyman, 10th District 2002–08
- George Nakano, former California State Assemblyman
- Michael Nakamura, former chief of the Honolulu Police Department
- Paula A. Nakayama, Associate Justice of the Hawaii State Supreme Court
- Karen Narasaki, executive director of the Asian American Justice Center
- Clarence K. Nishihara, member, Hawaii State Senate
- Steere Noda (1892–1986), politician, lawyer, and baseball player in the State of Hawaii
- Blake Oshiro, lawyer, former deputy chief of staff to the Governor of Hawaii and Majority Leader of the Hawaii House of Representatives
- Pete Rouse, interim White House Chief of Staff in the Barack Obama administration
- Pat Saiki (1930–2026), Congresswoman from Hawaii, Administrator of the Small Business Administration, Chair of the Hawaii Republican Party
- Scott Saiki, member, House of Representatives, Hawaii State Legislature
- Thomas Sakakihara (1900–1976), member 1932–1954, House of Representatives, Hawaii Territorial Legislature
- Sharon Tomiko Santos, Majority Whip, House of Representatives, Washington State Legislature
- Eleanor Sato, first Japanese-American to serve in the Maine Legislature.
- Eunice Sato (1921–2021), first Asian-American female mayor of a major American city (Long Beach, California)
- Maile Shimabukuro, member, House of Representatives, Hawaii State Legislature
- Mark Takai, former member, House of Representatives, Hawaii State Legislature
- Dwight Takamine, member, House of Representatives, Hawaii State Legislature
- Mark Takano (1960–), Congressman representing the 41st Congressional District of California; first LGBT person of color to be elected to Congress
- Gregg Takayama, member, House of Representatives, Hawaii State Legislature
- Robert Mitsuhiro Takasugi (1930–2009), first Japanese-American appointed to the federal bench
- Paul Tanaka, Mayor of the City of Gardena and Assistant Sheriff of the Los Angeles County Sheriff's Department
- A. Wallace Tashima, U.S. Court of Appeals, Ninth Circuit
- Jill N. Tokuda, member, Hawaii State Senate and US House of Representatives
- Wilfred Tsukiyama (1897–1966), first Asian American state chief justice (1959)
- Shan Tsutsui (born 1971), former Lieutenant Governor of Hawaii and President of the Hawaii Senate
- Grayce Uyehara, social worker and activist
- Glenn Wakai, member of the Hawaii Senate, former member of the Hawaii House of Representatives
- Takuji Yamashita (1874–1959), early civil rights pioneer
- Minoru Yasui (1916-1986), plaintiff in Yasui v. United States

== Religion ==
- Yoshiaki Fukuda (1898–1957), Bishop and missionary of Konkokyo
- Robert T. Hoshibata, Bishop of the United Methodist Church
- Mineo Katagiri (1919–2005), minister and activist
- Daisuke Kitagawa (1910–1970), reverend and episcopal priest
- Gyomay Kubose (1905–2000), Buddhist teacher and founder of Chicago Buddhist Church
- Shuichi Thomas Kurai (1947–2018), Sōtō Zen Rōshi and head abbot of Sozenji Buddhist Temple
- Roy I. Sano, Bishop of the United Methodist Church
- Nyogen Senzaki (1876–1958), one of the 20th century's leading proponents of Zen Buddhism
- Shunryū Suzuki (1904–1971), Sōtō Zen monk and teacher who helped popularize Zen Buddhism in the United States
- Kenneth K. Tanaka, scholar, author, translator and ordained Jōdo Shinshū priest
- Mitsumyo Tottori (1898–1976), Shingon Buddhist priest and missionary who was active in Hawaii
- Taitetsu Unno, Buddhist scholar, lecturer, and author
- Kenryu Takashi Tsuji (1919-2004) Shin Buddhist Minister, Bishop, author, founder of Buddhist Temples, President of Buddhist Churches of America and President of the Institute of Buddhist Studies
- Steven Maekawa, Dominican friar, the sixth Bishop of Fairbanks, and the first Japanese American Catholic bishop

== Science and technology ==
- Keiiti Aki (1930–2005), seismologist
- George I. Fujimoto (1920–2023), chemist
- Ted Fujita (1920–1998), creator of the Fujita scale
- Chris Hirata, cosmologist and astrophysicist
- Harvey Itano (1920–2010), biochemist and member of the United States National Academy of Sciences
- Mizuko Ito, cultural anthropologist at the University of California, Irvine
- Akiko Iwasaki, immunologist and professor at Yale University
- Michio Kaku, theoretical physicist specializing in string field theory
- Akihiro Kanamori, mathematician specializing in set theory
- Toichiro Kinoshita (1925–2023), theoretical physicist
- Jay Kochi (1927–2008), chemist
- Dorinne K. Kondo, anthropologist
- John Maeda, computer scientist, artist, professor at MIT
- Syukuro Manabe, 2021 Nobel Laureate in Physics
- Teruhisa Matsusaka (1926–2006), mathematician specializing in algebraic geometry
- Yoky Matsuoka, computer scientist; 2007 MacArthur Fellow
- Horace Yomishi Mochizuki (1937–1989), mathematician specializing in group theory
- Shuji Nakamura, 2014 Nobel Laureate in Physics
- Yoichiro Nambu (1921–2015), 2008 Nobel Laureate in Physics
- Isaac Namioka (1928–2019), mathematician who worked in general topology and functional analysis
- Susumu Ohno (1928–2000), geneticist and evolutionary biologist
- Ellison Onizuka (1946–1986), first Asian American astronaut; one of the "Challenger Seven"
- Ken Ono, mathematician specializing in number theory
- Santa J. Ono, immunologist, biologist, 28th President University of Cincinnati, 15th President & Vice-Chancellor University of British Columbia, 15th President University of Michigan
- Takashi Ono (1928–2026), mathematician specializing in number theory and algebraic groups
- Charles J. Pedersen (1904–1989), 1987 Nobel laureate in Chemistry; his mother was Japanese
- J. J. Sakurai (1933–1982)), physicist
- Gordon H. Sato (1927–2017), cell biologist and member of the United States National Academy of Sciences
- Tsutomu Shimomura, computer security expert
- Takamine Jōkichi (1854–1922) successful biochemist who founded one of the earliest pharmaceutical companies (Japanese expatriate)
- Daniel M. Tani, astronaut
- Lauren Kiyomi Williams, mathematician
- Ryuzo Yanagimachi, reproductive biologist and member of the United States National Academy of Sciences
- Sho Yano, physician and former child prodigy

== Sports ==
- Darwin Barney, MLB player, grandmother is from Japan and grandfather is from Korea.
- Steve Caballero, professional skateboarder and musician. In 1999, Thrasher Magazine named Caballero the "Skater of the Century". (Father is Japanese)
- Masahiro Chono, professional wrestler
- Clarissa Chun, American Olympic women's freestyle wrestler. The first female wrestler from Hawaii to win a medal at the Olympics. (Mother is Japanese-American)
- Bryan Clay, 2008 Olympic gold medalist in the decathlon
- Sophia Danenberg, mountain climber best known as the first African American and the first black woman to climb to the summit of Mount Everest. (Mother is Japanese)
- Jayden Daniels, American football player (maternal great-grandmother was Japanese)
- Sean Davis, soccer player for Nashville SC (Mother is Japanese descent)
- Paul Dombroski, NFL player
- Motohiko Eguchi, judo athlete
- Akira Fitzgerald, soccer player
- Rickie Fowler, professional golfer, maternal grandfather is Japanese
- Paul Fujii, professional boxer and WBA Junior Welterweight champion
- Tadd Fujikawa, teen golfer
- Harry Masayoshi Fujiwara, professional wrestler, Japanese and Native Hawaiian ancestry
- Corey Gaines, NBA player
- Miki Gorman (1935–2015), two-time winner of both the Boston and New York City marathons; former American and unofficial world record holder in the marathon
- Jeremy Guthrie, MLB player, mother is of Japanese descent
- Atlee Hammaker, All-Star MLB player, mother is of Japanese descent
- Kyle Higashioka, MLB player
- Hiroto Hirashima, member of the American Bowling Congress Hall of Fame
- Takashi "Halo" Hirose, first Japanese American to represent the United States in any international swimming competition, and the first to set a swimming world record
- Christian Hosoi, professional skateboarder
- Nyjah Huston, professional skateboarder who was the overall champion at the Street League Skateboarding (SLS) competition series in 2010, 2012, 2014, and 2017. He is also the highest paid skateboarder in the world. According to the interview he is of part Japanese descent.
- Bryan Iguchi, professional snowboarder
- Kyoko Ina, first place in the 1997, 1998, 2000, 2001, 2002 U.S. Figure Skating Championships (pairs)
- Rena Inoue, first place in the 2004 and 2006 U.S. Figure Skating Championships (pairs)
- Andrei Iosivas, NFL wide receiver born in Japan
- Emerick Ishikawa, weightlifter
- Travis Ishikawa, MLB player
- Jeremy Ito, CFL player
- Billy Johnson, professional sports car and stock car racing driver.
- Bill Kajikawa, football, basketball, and baseball coach
- Evelyn Kawamoto (1933–2017), won two Olympic bronze medals in swimming in 1952
- Isiah Kiner-Falefa, MLB player
- Kurt Kitayama, professional golfer
- Ann Kiyomura, 1975 Wimbledon doubles tennis champion.
- Ford Konno, former world record holder, two-time Olympic gold medalist, two-time Olympic silver medalist in swimming (1952 and 1956)
- Tommy Kono (1930–2016), former world record holder, two-time Olympic gold medalist and Olympic silver medalist in weightlifting (1952, 1956, and 1960)
- Shogo Kubo, professional skateboarder
- Steven Kwan, MLB player
- Kyle Larson, Sansei, 2021 NASCAR Cup Series champion
- Brandon League, MLB player
- Jay Litherland, competition swimmer
- Mike Lum, first American of Japanese ancestry to play in the major leagues
- Darin Maki, Nisei professional basketball player and former judo champion
- Les Maruo, CFL player
- Onan Masaoka, MLB player
- Arthur Matsu, NFL player
- Wataru Misaka (1923–2019), professional basketball pioneer, broke the NBA color barrier in 1947
- Collin Morikawa, professional golfer
- Chad Morton, NFL player
- Johnnie Morton, NFL player
- Mirai Nagasu, Olympic bronze medalist figure skater and women's singles champion at the 2008 U.S. Figure Skating Championships
- Keo Nakama (1920–2011), swimmer and world record holder
- Haruki Nakamura, NFL safety, Baltimore Ravens and Carolina Panthers
- Hikaru Nakamura, chess grandmaster and US champion (2005, 2009, 2012, 2015, 2019)
- Natalie Nakase, basketball player and coach
- Brandon Nakashima, tennis player born to a Japanese American father and a Vietnamese mother
- Corey Nakatani, jockey with seven wins in Breeders' Cup races
- Julius Naranjo, weightlifter, coach, and filmmaker
- Teiko Nishi, Sansei, women's basketball starter for UCLA
- Lars Nootbaar, professional baseball player
- Apolo Anton Ohno, won eight Olympic medals in short-track speed skating (two gold) in 2002, 2006, and 2010, as well as a world cup championship
- Dan Osman, extreme sport practitioner / rock-climber, known for the dangerous sports of free-soloing. At the time of his legacy, he was considered to be the no. 1 rock-climber in the world. (He was of Japanese and European descent)
- Yoshinobu Oyakawa, former world record holder and 1952 Olympic gold medalist in the 100-meter backstroke
- Dave Roberts, manager of the Los Angeles Dodgers
- Gotoku Sakai, professional soccer player
- Harold Sakata (1920–1982), 1948 Olympic silver medalist weightlifter, actor, and wrestler
- Lenn Sakata, professional baseball player for the World Series Champions Baltimore Orioles
- Louie Sakoda, NFL player
- Eric Sato, won a 1988 Olympic gold medal in volleyball
- Liane Sato, won a 1992 Olympic bronze medal in volleyball
- Daniel Schmidt, soccer player
- Rocky Seto, NFL coach
- Kiefer Sherwood, NHL player (Mother is Japanese)
- Alex Shibutani, two-time national champion and Olympic bronze medalist ice dancer
- Maia Shibutani, two-time national champion and Olympic bronze medalist ice dancer
- Kinji Shibuya, professional wrestler and actor
- Ashima Shiraishi, American rock climber
- Erik Shoji, US National team volleyball player
- Kawika Shoji, US National team volleyball player and Erik Shoji's brother
- Gyo Shojima, American football center
- Jelani Reshaun Sumiyoshi, soccer player
- Rex Sunahara, NFL player
- Kurt Suzuki, MLB player
- Robert Swift, NBA player
- Derek Tatsuno, baseball player selected to the All-Time All-Star Team of Collegiate Baseball America
- Janet Todd, Muay Thai kickboxer and Kickboxing world champion
- Cayman Togashi, soccer player
- Shane Victorino, Sansei, MLB player
- Don Wakamatsu, Yonsei, MLB's first Japanese-American manager
- Rex Walters, NBA player
- Peter Westbrook (1952–2024), Olympic fencing bronze medalist and 13-time national champion
- Kristi Yamaguchi, Yonsei, won three national figure skating championships, two world titles, and the 1992 Olympic gold medal
- Lindsey Yamasaki, professional basketball player (Miami Sol, New York Liberty, San Jose Spiders), Stanford University (basketball, volleyball)
- Roger Yasukawa, auto-racing driver (IRL)
- Christian Yelich, professional baseball outfielder for the Milwaukee Brewers of Major League Baseball (MLB). His maternal grandfather Mineo Dan Oda is Japanese.
- Wally Yonamine (1925–2011), football player; first Japanese American in the NFL; professional baseball player in Nippon Professional Baseball League
- Wheeler Yuta, professional wrestler

== Other academia ==
- Nobutaka Ike, Stanford University professor of Japanese and East Asian politics
- Fujio Matsuda, first Asian-American president of a major American university, as president of the University of Hawaiʻi
- James Sakoda (1916–2005), psychologist and origamist
- Michael Otsuka, left-libertarian political philosopher.

== See also ==
- Foreign-born Japanese
- List of Japanese people
