= Michael K. Lee =

American actor (born 1973)

Michael K. Lee (born June 5, 1973) is an American actor and singer who is based in Seoul, South Korea.

== Early life and education ==
Lee was born in Brooklyn, New York to Susie and Won Yub Lee. He was raised in Salamanca, a small Native American reservation town near Buffalo, where his father, a surgeon, set up his practice. They were the only Asian-American family in the town. He played both violin and piano, and performed in the Greater Buffalo Youth Orchestra. He is a graduate of Stanford University, where he studied psychology on a pre-med track and sang with the Stanford Fleet Street Singers.

== Career ==
Lee's career began in 1995, when he was cast in the second national tour of Miss Saigon. He auditioned for the show on three occasions before he was cast. Lee went on to join the Broadway production of Miss Saigon (Thuy). His other Broadway credits include Jesus Christ Superstar (Simon Zealotes), Pacific Overtures (Kayama), and Rent.

From 2015 to 2016, Lee starred in the musical Allegiance on Broadway, a show about George Takei's life experiences (who starred in the musical alongside Lee). In the show, Lee reprised the role of Frankie Suzuki, a character based on real-life political activist Frank S. Emi. The role had won him the San Diego Theatre Critics Circle's Craig Noel Award for Outstanding Featured Performance in 2012, during the Allegiance's run at the Old Globe there. Allegiance began Broadway previews on October 6, 2015, and opened on November 8, 2015, running through early 2016.

Lee has starred in numerous productions in Seoul, including Jesus Christ Superstar (Jesus), Miss Saigon (Chris), Priscilla, Queen of the Desert (Tick), Notre Dame de Paris (Gringoire), Amour (Dusoleil), and Gone with the Wind (Ashley). His other international credits include Where Elephants Weep in Phnom Penh, Cambodia, They’re Playing Our Song in Manila, Philippines (opposite Lea Salonga), and A Twist of Fate in Singapore (opposite Laura Michelle Kelley).

Lee portrayed Tommy in The Who's Tommy, winning a Seattle Footlight Award for Best Actor in a Musical; Judas and Jesus in Jesus Christ Superstar, Aladdin in Disney's Aladdin: A Musical Spectacular; and Jamie Willerstein in The Last Five Years.

== Personal life ==
As of 2013, he lives in Seoul, South Korea. He is married to actress Kim Varhola.

== Theater ==
Year	Title	Role	Region
1991–2001	Miss Saigon	Thuy - Replacement	Broadway
1999	Beijing Spring		LA
2000	Jesus Christ Superstar	Simon Zealotes	Broadway
...	They’re Playing Our Song	...	Manila, Philippines
2001	The Last Five Years	Jamie Willerstein	
...	A Funny Thing Happened on the Way to the Forum	Hero	...
2003	Disney's Aladdin: A Musical Spectacular	Aladdin	Disneyland
2004–05	Pacific Overtures	Kayama	Broadway
2005	A Twist of Fate	...	Esplanade Theatre, Singapore
2006	Miss Saigon (South Korea debut)	Chris	South Korea
2007	The Who's Tommy	Tommy	
2008	The King and I	...	Village Theatre, Issaquah, WA
...	Where Elephants Weep	...	Phnom Penh, Cambodia
2010	Miss Saigon	Chris	South Korea
2011	Jesus Christ Superstar	Jesus Christ / Judas Iscariot	Village Theatre, WA
2012	Allegiance (musical)	Frankie Suzuki	Old Globe Theatre, San Diego
2013	Jesus Christ Superstar	Jesus Christ	South Korea
2013	Notre Dame de Paris	Gringoire	South Korea
2014	Priscilla, Queen of the Desert	Tick	South Korea
2014	Amour	Dusoleil	South Korea
2014	Seopyeonje	Dongho	South Korea
2014	The Devil	X	South Korea
2015	Gone with the Wind (musical)	Ashley	South Korea
2015	Jesus Christ Superstar	Jesus Christ	South Korea
2015–16	Allegiance (musical)	Frankie Suzuki	Broadway
2016	Nevermore: The Imaginary Life and Mysterious Death of Edgar Allan Poe	Edgar Allan Poe	South Korea
2016	Notre-Dame de Paris (musical)	Gringoire	South Korea
2017	Rocky Horror Show	Dr. Frank N. Furter	South Korea
2017	Napoleon	Napoleon	South Korea
2017	Hedwig and the Angry Inch (musical)	Hedwig	South Korea
2018	The Phantom of the Opera	Raoul	South Korea
2018	Notre-Dame de Paris (musical)	Gringoire	South Korea
2018	Rocky Horror Show	Dr. Frank N. Furter	South Korea
2019	Hedwig and the Angry Inch (musical)	Hedwig	South Korea
2020	Something Rotten!	Nostradamus	South Korea
2020	Eyes of Dawn	Jang Ha-rim	South Korea
2021	Blue Helmet : A Song of Meissa	Commander	South Korea
2021	Jesus Christ Superstar	Jesus Christ	Japan
2022–23	Jesus Christ Superstar	Jesus Christ	South Korea
2023	The Devil	X-White	Japan
2024	Notre-Dame de Paris (musical)	Gringoire	South Korea
2024	Next to Normal	Dan	South Korea
2024–25	Jesus Christ Superstar	Jesus Christ	South Korea
2025–26	Evita	Che	South Korea

== TV shows ==
- 2017: Phantom Singer 2, jury member
- 2020: King of Mask Singer (MBC), contestant as "Half Moon Prince" (episodes 247–248)
- 2023: XO, Kitty (Netflix), Professor Lee of Korean Independent School of Seoul (KISS)
