= Motohiko =

- Gender: Male

Origin
- Origin: Japanese
- Meaning: Different meanings depending on the kanji used

Motohiko (written: 元彦 or 基彦) is a masculine Japanese given name. Notable people with the name include:

- Motohiko Ban (伴 素彦) (1905-1998), Japanese ski jumper
- Motohiko Eguchi, Japanese Judo athlete
- Motohiko Hino,(1946–1999) Japanese jazz drummer
- Motohiko Izawa (井沢 元彦) (born 1954), Japanese writer
- Motohiko Kondo (近藤 基彦) (born 1954), Japanese politician
- Motohiko Nakajima (中島 元彦) (born 1999), Japanese football player
- Motohiko Saitō (斎藤 元彦) (born 1977), Japanese politician
