= Kusumoto =

Kusumoto (written: 楠本) is a Japanese surname. Notable people with the surname include:

- Kusumoto Ine (楠本 イネ, 1827–1903), Japanese physician
- Roy Kusumoto, American businessman
- Takumi Kusumoto (楠本 卓海, born 1995), Japanese footballer
