= Allegiance (musical) =

Musical by Jay Kuo, Marc Acito and Lorenzo Thione

- Logo of the musical Allegiance
- Music: Jay Kuo
- Lyrics: Jay Kuo
- Book: Marc Acito; Jay Kuo; Lorenzo Thione
- Basis: George Takei's personal experiences during the Japanese American internment of World War II
- Productions: 2012 San Diego; 2015 Broadway

Allegiance is a musical with music and lyrics by Jay Kuo and a book by Marc Acito, Kuo and Lorenzo Thione. The story, set during the Japanese American internment of World War II (with a framing story set in the present day), was inspired by the personal experiences of George Takei, who starred in the musical. It follows the Kimura family in the years following the attack on Pearl Harbor, as they are forced to leave their farm in Salinas, California, and are sent to the Heart Mountain Relocation Center in the rural plains of Wyoming.

The musical began development in 2008 and premiered in September 2012 in San Diego, California. It played on Broadway from October 2015 to February 2016. Reviews on Broadway were mixed, although the cast was generally praised. Further productions were mounted in Los Angeles in 2018 and London in 2023.

== Conception and historical perspective ==
In the fall of 2008, George Takei and his husband, Brad, were coincidentally seated next to Jay Kuo and Lorenzo Thione at an Off-Broadway show, where a brief conversation revealed a common love of theater. The next day, the four were once again seated together at a Broadway show, In the Heights. At intermission, Kuo and Thione approached Takei, curious as to why he had been so emotionally affected by the father's song ("Inútil” (Useless)) in which he laments his inability to help his family. Over the course of that intermission, Takei recounted his personal experience as a child in a Japanese internment camp, during World War II, and his own father's sense of helplessness at his inability to protect his family that was mirrored in the song. Kuo and Thione felt that Takei's family's experience would make a great show. Although previous major Broadway musicals have involved Asian and Asian-American topics or settings, including three of Rodgers and Hammerstein's shows, Pacific Overtures and Miss Saigon, Allegiance is "the first [Broadway] musical created by Asian Americans, directed by an Asian American ... with a predominantly Asian cast ... [and] an Asian-American viewpoint informing the work".

The story of the musical takes some liberties with history. According to Frank Abe, the creator of the documentary film Conscience and the Constitution, the musical "conflate[s] Heart Mountain with the worst of the segregation center at Tule Lake and invent[s] military rule at Heart Mountain." The processing of new arrivals is embellished for dramatic effect, as handcuffs and physical abuse by military police was not reported in the internment camps. Abe comments that the resistance by the Heart Mountain Fair Play Committee was a studied act of civil disobedience, not a gang of "fists-raised revolutionaries". He notes: "No firearms were used inside the [camps'] perimeter. The resistance was open and above-board, its meetings open to the public. No one had to run or hide; leaders of the Fair Play Committee were quietly taken into custody at their family barracks. ... The resisters knew they risked five years in prison for bucking the draft, but violating the Selective Service Act was never a capital crime, never treason. No resistance leader at Heart Mountain was beaten bloody or hunted by guards", draft cards were not burned, and no newspaper articles affected the internment; notably Frankie would not have been taken to the infirmary by military police, which causes the key conflict in the show. Abe objects to the portrayal of the activities and treatment of the resisters, and to the "relentless optimism" of the score, concluding that the show distorts the historical lesson, diminishes the real impact of "the anger and suppressed rage" that the internees carried from the internment camps, and "risks supplanting the truth of the resistance and the Japanese American experience in the popular mind [and] cheapens the fabric of basic reality to achieve [commercial] ends."

== Synopsis ==
=== Act I ===
In 2001, aged World War II veteran Sam Kimura prepares for a Pearl Harbor anniversary ceremony. A woman arrives and tells him his estranged sister Keiko (Kei) has died; as Kei's executor, she gives Sam a packet and tells him the funeral will be held that afternoon. Angered by the opening of his old family wounds after nearly 60 years of estrangement, he berates his once-beloved sister for not leaving him in peace. Kei's ghost informs Sam that she couldn't rest in peace without making one last attempt to reconnect with him ("Prologue").

It is 1941, and Sammy is a newly elected class president who dreams of "Going Places", like college and high political office ("Wishes on the Wind"). His widowed father Tatsuo and grandfather Kaito (Ojii-chan) own a farm in Salinas, California. Sammy adores his older sister Kei, who has postponed her dreams to help raise him. Tatsuo is always pushing Sammy to be better and reach his potential. Sammy believes that Tatsuo blames Sammy for his wife's death in childbirth. After the Japanese sneak attack on Pearl Harbor in December, the US government fears that Japanese-Americans might be loyal to the Empire of Japan. Although Tatsuo advises his family to keep a low profile, Sammy volunteers for the military but is rejected as an enemy alien. Even as Japanese-Americans in the Western US are incarcerated in internment camps, Mike Masaoka, head of the Japanese American Citizens League (JACL), advises them to trust the US government. Sammy's family sells their beautiful farm for a discounted price and are sent to the bleak Heart Mountain Relocation Center in Wyoming ("Do Not Fight the Storm").

There Kei counsels patience; Tatsuo grimly accepts the events that led to internment ("Gaman"). Sammy believes military service is the way to prove internees' patriotism and win their freedom ("What Makes a Man"). When Ojii-chan becomes sick, Sammy asks the white Quaker volunteer nurse at the camp, Hannah, for cough syrup. She tells him it is only for the staff, but Sammy persuades her to give him the medication ("I Oughta Go"). Sammy helps the JACL organize the camp to petition for concessions ("Get in the Game"). Hannah and Sammy begin a relationship that causes additional tensions because interracial marriage is illegal ("Should I"). Tatsuo, outraged by the unjust loyalty questionnaire intended to identify "disloyal" Japanese, refuses to swear his allegiance to America; against his father's wishes, Sammy continues to try to enlist ("Allegiance").

Ojii-chan persuades Kei to go to the dance by insisting that mountains can be moved one stone at a time ("Ishi Kara Ishi"). Sammy and Hannah wish for a world where they could be together ("With You"). Kei has fallen in love with a draft resistance leader, Frankie Suzuki. Masaoka and the JACL advise internees to swear allegiance on the loyalty questionnaire to avoid being separated from their families ("Paradise"); Tatsuo is sent to a brutal prison for refusing. Kei reflects on her dead mother and Sammy's childhood ("Higher"). The siblings choose diverging paths: Sammy will risk his life in military service, while Kei joins the resistance advocating for internees' rights ("Our Time Now").

=== Act II ===
Masaoka obtains permission for Japanese-Americans to enlist, but only if they take the most dangerous assignments in Italy. Sammy enlists in the 442nd Regimental Combat Team, an all-Nisei unit. Frankie pledges to resist the draft unless his family is freed; Sammy condemns Frankie as a draft-dodger in an interview with Life magazine that trumpets Sammy's combat record ("Resist"). Tatsuo is given a copy of the magazine and released from prison because of Sammy's actions.

Kei and Frankie help lead the camp's resistance ("This Is Not Over") before Frankie is jailed ("Resist" (reprise)). Hannah promises to help Kei win Frankie's freedom ("Stronger Than Before"). Sammy sees Hannah while on leave ("With You" (reprise)) before he leads a suicide mission, which kills most of his fellow soldiers ("442nd Battle"). In camp, during a scuffle between Frankie and a military policeman, Hannah is accidentally and fatally shot. Ojii-chan dies peacefully while tending his vegetable garden. Upon release, Frankie asks Kei to marry him ("Nothing in Our Way"). After the Enola Gay bombs Hiroshima ("Itetsuita"), America celebrates victory, and each internee is released and given $25 and a bus ticket ("Victory Swing").

After the war, Sammy learns that Frankie and Kei have a daughter, Hanako, named after Hannah. Aghast, he confronts Tatsuo, who tells him that Frankie was the son he always wanted. Already furious at Kei and Frankie for their role in the draft resistance, their involvement in Hannah's death is the final straw; he accepts a job in Washington offered by Masaoka. Kei argues with Sammy, calling him a coward for leaving ("How Can You Go?"). She tries to stop him, but only manages to tear the Purple Heart off of his uniform. Sammy bitterly insists that his sacrifice was worth losing his family ("What Makes a Man" (reprise)).

Back in 2001, Sam opens the packet from Kei: inside is the Life issue, featuring Sammy's exploits, that Tatsuo had kept since the war. Sam attends Kei's funeral; her executor tells him her mother wanted to give Sam something else, and hands him his old Purple Heart medal. He realizes that the executor is his niece, Hanako. He breaks down, aware of his chance to forgive and to share in the love and compassion of his family ("Still a Chance").

== Productions ==
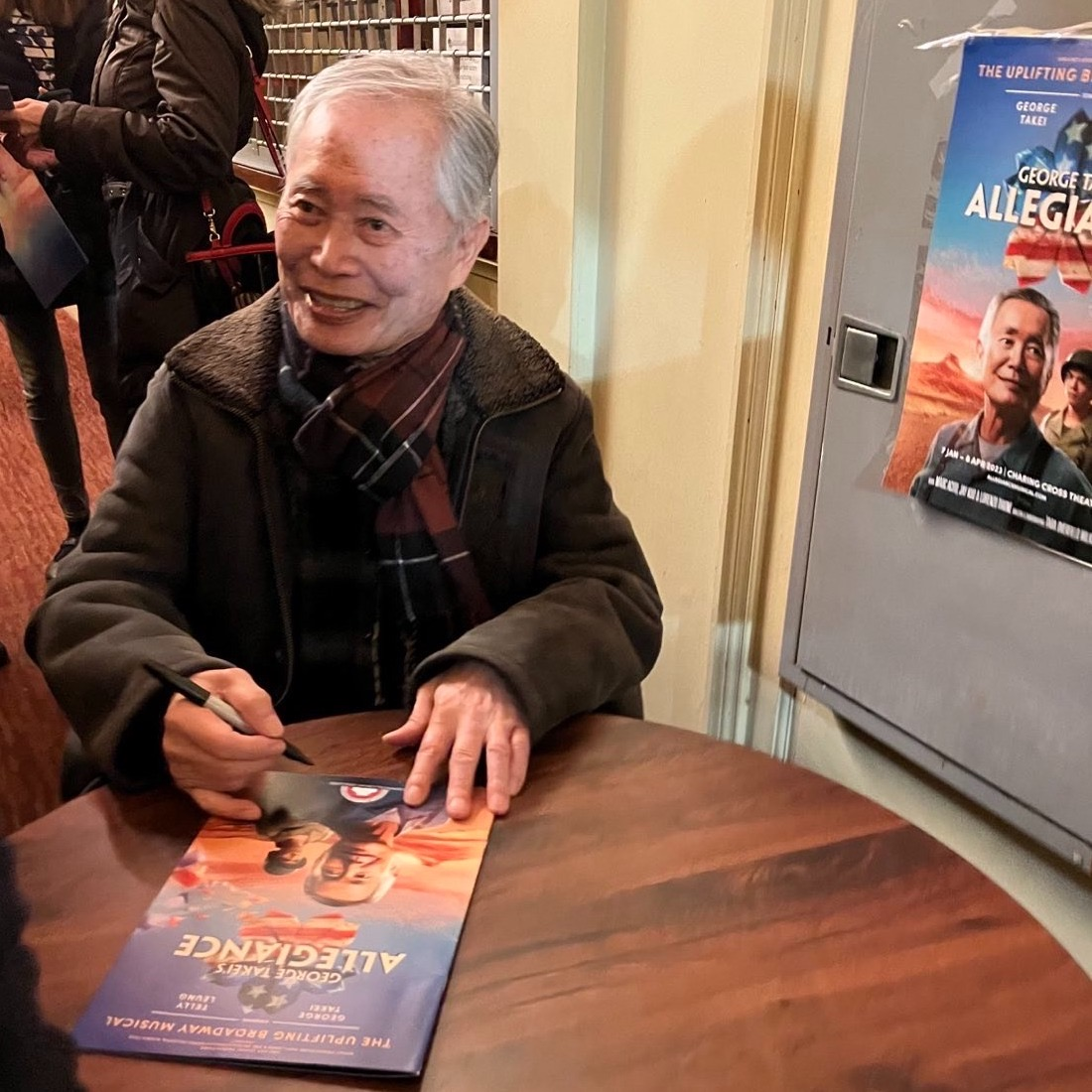
George Takei at Charing Cross Theatre during the 2023 London production of Allegiance

Allegiance had its first reading at the Japanese American National Museum on July 13, 2009, starring George Takei, Lea Salonga and others. It was followed by two more readings that were held in New York in 2010 with the same two, but this time with Telly Leung, among others. In the summer of 2011, a workshop was held for Allegiance at the Old Globe Theatre in San Diego. To commemorate the Japanese-American Day of Remembrance, the memorial for Japanese American Internment, George Takei took to Facebook to initiate a crowd funding campaign through IndieGoGo to raise funds for the show. The initial target was $50,000; the eventual total raised exceeded $158,000. The musical premiered in September 2012 at the Old Globe, directed by Stafford Arima and choreographed by Andrew Palermo, with designs by Donyale Werle (sets), Howell Binkley (lighting) and Alejo Vietti (costumes). It became the Old Globe's biggest box-office success in history. To help fund and publicize a Broadway run, the producers sold Allegiance "Priority Passes" in 2014 for five dollars. The pass allowed people to buy tickets before they were available to the general public.

The Broadway production began previews on October 6, 2015, at the Longacre Theatre and opened officially on November 8, 2015, with the same cast and crew as in San Diego, except that Christopheren Nomura played Tatsuo, Katie Rose Clarke was Hannah and Greg Watanabe was Mike. It closed on February 14, 2016, after 37 previews and 111 regular performances. The Broadway cast album was released on January 29, 2016. A filmed performance of the Broadway production was screened at roughly 600 movie theatres in North America in December 2016, with encore screenings on the Japanese Day of Remembrance in February 2017. Additional screenings were held in 481 theatres on December 7, 2017, to coincide with the anniversary of the Pearl Harbor attacks, and in Hawaii on December 7 and 9, 2017.

Takei reprised his roles for the musical's Los Angeles production at the Japanese American Cultural & Community Center, co-produced by East West Players (EWP), for a run from February 21 to April 1, 2018. Takei was joined by five actors from the original Broadway cast in the production, with direction by EWP's artistic director Snehal Desai and choreography by Rumi Oyama. The producers created an interactive study guide about Japanese internment during World War II for educators and students.

The musical received an Off West End production at the Charing Cross Theatre in London from January 7 to April 8, 2023, with Takei and Leung reprising their roles. It was directed and choreographed by Tara Overfield Wilkinson, with Aynrand Ferrer as Kei and Masashi Fujimoto as Tatsuo.

== Principal roles and original casts ==
| Character | San Diego (2012) | Original Broadway (2015) |
|---|---|---|
| Sam Kimura (present day) / "Ojii-chan" (Grandpa) (1940s) | George Takei | George Takei |
| Kei Kimura | Lea Salonga | Lea Salonga |
| Sam Kimura (1940s) | Telly Leung | Telly Leung |
| Frankie Suzuki | Michael K. Lee | Michael K. Lee |
| Tatsuo Kimura | Paul Nakauchi | Christopheren Nomura |
| Hannah Campbell | Allie Trimm | Katie Rose Clarke |
| Mike Masaoka | Paolo Montalban | Greg Watanabe |

== Musical numbers ==
Act I

- "Prologue" – Kei and Company
- "Wishes on the Wind" – Kei, Sammy and Company
- "Do Not Fight the Storm" – Company
- "Gaman" – Kei, Tatsuo and Company
- "What Makes a Man" – Sammy
- "I Oughta Go" – Hannah and Sammy
- "Get in the Game" – Sammy, Kei and Company
- "Should I" – Hannah and Kei
- "Allegiance" – Tatsuo, Sammy, Kei and Company
- "Ishi Kara Ishi" – Ojii-chan and Kei
- "With You" – Big Band Singer, Sammy and Hannah
- "Paradise" – Frankie and Company
- "Higher" – Kei
- "Our Time Now" – Sammy, Frankie, Kei, Hannah and Company

Act II

- "Resist" – Frankie and Company
- "This Is Not Over" – Kei and Frankie
- "Higher/Resist" (reprises) – Kei and Company
- "Stronger Than Before" – Kei and Hannah
- "With You" (reprise) – Sammy and Hannah
- "Nothing in Our Way" – Frankie and Kei
- "Itetsuita" – Company
- "442 Victory Swing" – USO Pilots and Company
- "Higher/Ishi Kara Ishi" (reprises) – Kei and Tatsuo
- "How Can You Go?" – Kei and Sammy
- "Still a Chance" – Kei and Company

== Reception ==
=== Critical reaction ===
For the Old Globe production in 2012, critics felt the subject was important but the show required better execution. Writing for the Los Angeles Times, Anne Marie Welsh concluded the "show needs a sharper emotional focus and musical edge to match its bold subject". For the San Diego Reader, critic Jeff Smith wrote "Right now, Allegiance is, at best, an 'important' musical. But it needs a great deal of rethinking and reshaping to become a good one."

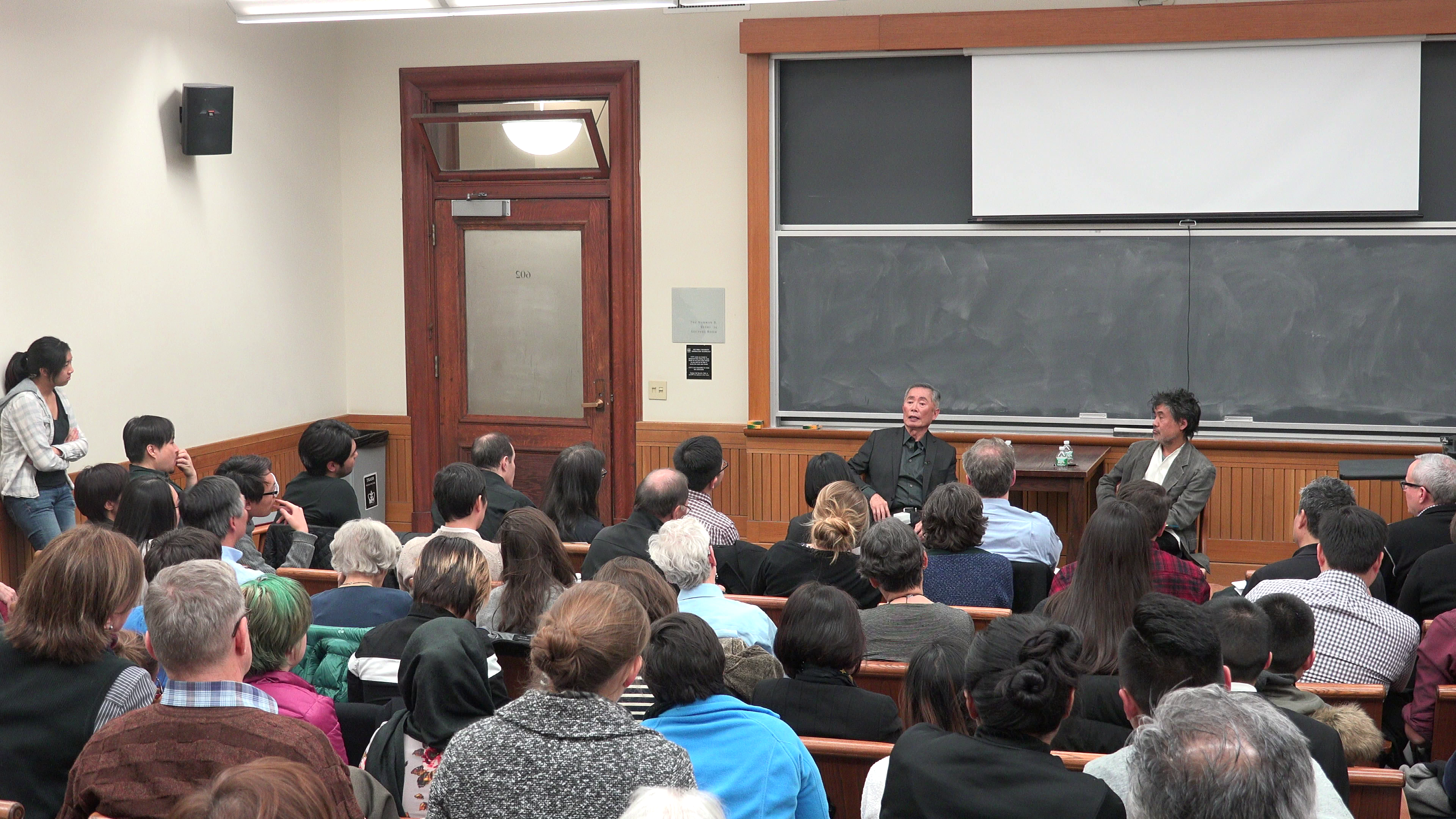
David Henry Hwang and George Takei discussing Allegiance at Columbia University in late 2015

Critical reception for the Broadway production was mixed. While the cast was often praised, especially Takei's characterization and Salonga's singing, the reviews frequently criticized poor execution of a worthy subject, especially the lyrics. "The majority of critics admired Allegiance's noble intentions to illuminate a dark corner of America’s past, but found the book melodramatic and the score derivative." Alexis Soloski of The Guardian called the musical "unexceptional though often affecting" and gave it three stars out of five. She liked some of the 1940s style songs but said of the ballads that "none of the melodies linger once the curtain has fallen and the lyrics pile on platitude and cliché."

Entertainment Weekly's review singled out Takei's performance as "providing much-needed islands of levity amidst a sea of sadness. ... Allegiance is an important show with a phenomenal cast, and it deserves to be seen." Rex Reed, in The New York Observer praised the book, score and direction, writing: "The [finale] brought tears to my eyes. The audience is overwhelmed. The screams are voluminous. The songs carry you aloft on wings of triumph, and the greatest cast of under-used Asian talents since Flower Drum Song and Pacific Overtures brings a cheering crowd to its feet every night with a standing ovation that is well deserved." Linda Winer in Newsday commented that the musical "carries its heavy baggage with a surprising lightness of spirit. ... The show has fully developed characters, a strong cast and a new story to tell in an old-fashioned way." The San Diego Union-Tribune, having reviewed the original production at the Old Globe in 2012, was more positive, feeling that the new production, "retains both its powerful story core and a good deal of its lush and melodic score, along with nearly all the top cast members from the original version. ... At its best, “Allegiance” gracefully shapes dramatic and historical contours into an epic that – in the spirit of gaman – coaxes a fierce beauty from once-poisoned soil." In a review that gave Allegiance three stars out of four, USA Today felt that even though the show "is as corny as Kansas in August and as obvious as Lady Gaga on a red carpet ... [but] if you can make a critic who sneered in the first act leave the theater a little teary-eyed, you're probably doing something right." Deadline magazine called Allegiance "another significant addition to a Broadway season that offers an alternative take on the American experience. ... Validation is hardly the worst crime a show can commit, and I think that’s one reason the audience was cheering at the very moving end of the show. It’s a triumph of a rare sort, shedding light in a dark corner of our history with uncommon generosity of spirit."

In The New York Times, however, Charles Isherwood praised the performers but wrote: "The show wants to illuminate a dark passage in American history with complexity and honesty, but the first requirement of any Broadway musical is to entertain. ... Allegiance ... doesn't always find an equilibrium." Variety felt that, despite good performances and designs, the well-intentioned story would have been better suited as a play, and that "In their sincere efforts to 'humanize' their complex historical material, the creatives have oversimplified and reduced it to generic themes." In a similar way, The Hollywood Reporter felt that as a musical, "the broad-strokes storytelling ... seems ill-suited to examining such complex issues, and the book's superficial character development doesn't help either." Michael Dale of BroadwayWorld.com admired the cast, but thought that "Allegiance, while certainly not a bad theatre piece, is an underachieving one." The large number of songs was seen as a problem by The Huffington Post, which noted: "Though Kuo has written a lot of it, the score just doesn't make the grade." Mark Kennedy of the Associated Press complained of jarring writing, commenting: "There are long periods of unrelenting misery, with families ripped from their homes and subjected to brutality by vindictive white soldiers. Then there's a song about the joys of baseball. That gives way to scenes with dangerous, choking dust storms, a dead baby and jail beatings. Then there is a happy sock hop." Critical of both the score and the script, Jesse Green of Vulture thought that outside of several moments, "too much of the show is devoted to far-fetched plot twists whose attempts to gin up excitement only look silly in the shadow of the larger forces at work." Terry Teachout of The Wall Street Journal praised Takei, Salonga and Arima's direction, and felt the set was worthy of a Tony Award, but criticized Kuo's score, and deemed the show "of no artistic value whatsoever, save as an object lesson in how to write a really bad Broadway musical."

=== Major awards and nominations ===
| Year | Award Ceremony | Category | Nominee | Result |
|---|---|---|---|---|
| 2012 | Craig Noel Award | Outstanding New Musical | | Won |
| 2012 | Craig Noel Award | Best Featured Performance by a Male | Michael K. Lee | Won |
| 2012 | Craig Noel Award | Best Orchestrations | Lynne Shankel | Won |
| 2012 | Craig Noel Award | Best Featured Performance by a Female | Lea Salonga | Nominated |
| 2012 | Craig Noel Award | Best Director | Stafford Arima | Nominated |
| 2016 | Drama Desk Award | Outstanding Costume Design of a Musical | Alejo Vietti | Nominated |
