= Heart Mountain Fair Play Committee =

American political group active against drafting Japanese-American citizens

The Heart Mountain Fair Play Committee (Japanese: ハートマウンテン・フェアプレイ委員会 Hātomaunten Feapurei Iinkai) was a group organized in 1943 to protest the draft of Nisei (U.S. citizens born to Japanese immigrant parents), from Japanese American concentration camps during World War II. Kiyoshi Okamoto formed a "Fair Play Committee of One" in response to the War Relocation Authority's controversial loyalty questionnaire in 1943, and was later joined by Frank Emi and other inmates of the Heart Mountain camp (from which the Committee took its name). With seven older leaders at its core, the Committee's membership grew as draft notices began to arrive in camp. To challenge their forced "evacuation" by the government, they refused to volunteer or participate in the draft, but the Committee required its members to be citizens loyal to the United States willing to serve if their rights were restored. By June 1944, several dozen young men had been arrested and charged by the U.S. government with felony draft evasion. While the camp at Poston, Arizona produced the largest group of draft resisters, at 106, the Fair Play Committee was the most prominent inmate organization to protest the draft, and the rate of draft resistance at Heart Mountain (out of a much smaller population) was the highest of any camp. The number of resisters eventually numbered nearly 300 from all ten camps.

A total of 85 Heart Mountain resisters and the Committee leaders were convicted for Selective Service Act violations and sentenced to three to five years in federal prison. In 1947, they were pardoned by President Harry S. Truman, but for decades the Fair Play Committee members were largely seen within the Japanese American community as traitors and cowards (especially when pitted against the famed 100th Infantry Battalion, also known as the "Purple Heart Battalion" and the 442nd RCT whose motto was a Hawaiian pidgin English phrase "Go for Broke"). In the post-war years, Japanese Americans struggled to re-establish their place in American society, but in the 1970s a movement began to gain redress for their forced imprisonment in the concentration camps; as former inmates spoke out about their wartime experiences, attitudes towards the resisters began to change.

Since the late 20th century, the draft resisters have been recognized as objectors of conscience with an equally important place in the incarceration history, although their legacy remains a point of contention for many. In 2002, the Japanese American Citizens League, which during the war was a vocal opponent of the Committee and worked with the FBI to prosecute its members, formally apologized for its role in their imprisonment and subsequent ostracization.

== Background and formation of the FPC ==
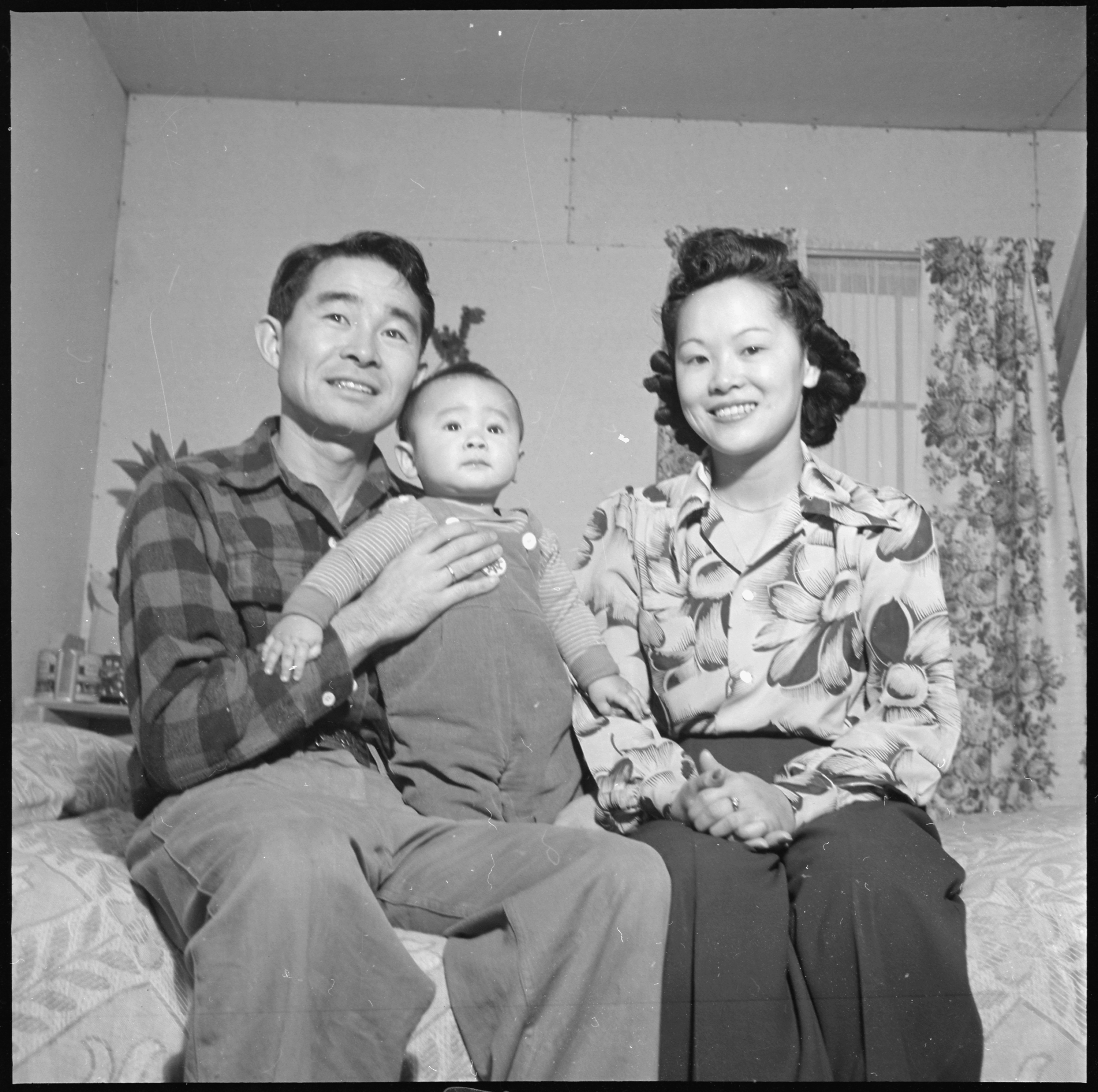
Paul Nakadate, one of the seven Fair Play leaders, with his wife and son in their barracks apartment in Heart Mountain (NARA)

After Japan's December 1941 attack on Pearl Harbor pulled the United States into World War II, Japanese Americans quickly became conflated with the enemy, in large part due to existing prejudices and competing business interests. Especially on the West Coast, where the mainland Japanese American population and the nativist groups who lobbied for their incarceration were concentrated, political leaders and well-connected citizens pushed for a solution to the "Japanese problem." On February 19, 1942, President Franklin Roosevelt issued Executive Order 9066, authorizing military commanders to designate areas from which "any or all persons may be excluded." Over the next few months some 112,000 to 120,000 West Coast Japanese were forcibly removed to inland concentration camps. Two-thirds of them were American citizens born in the United States.

Heart Mountain, located halfway between the Wyoming towns of Cody and Powell, was one of ten camps run by the War Relocation Authority (WRA), the government agency responsible for administration of the incarceration program. At many camps, it required Japanese Americans to work at building their own prison barracks. By the start of 1943, Heart Mountain had reached its peak population of 10,767. The WRA soon after began distributing a leave clearance registration form among adults in all ten camps, hoping to encourage some Japanese Americans to resettle outside the West Coast and relieve overcrowding in camp. The registration was initially given only to Nisei who had volunteered for resettlement. However, as the need increased to draft replacement troops for U.S. forces in Europe and North Africa, WRA officials saw an opportunity to assess the loyalty of incarcerated Japanese Americans and expanded the so-called "loyalty questionnaire" to vet potential enlistees and troublemakers.

The loyalty questionnaire was unpopular among prisoners in Heart Mountain and every other WRA camp, mostly because of its final two questions: Would the respondent volunteer for military service (Question 27); and would the person forswear allegiance to the Emperor of Japan (Question 28). Many young men were insulted to be asked to enlist on behalf of a country that had imprisoned them and forced the loss of their family businesses and homes. They also resented the second question, which seemed to assume that Japanese Americans had, at some point, been loyal to Japan rather than the United States. Others were simply confused, fearing that an affirmative answer to Question 27 would be equated with volunteering for dangerous combat duty, and that a "renunciation" of allegiance to Japan would be considered an admission of previous guilt and used to justify deportation or other punishment.

Inmates organized the Heart Mountain Fair Play Committee based on initial resistance to the loyalty questionnaire. Frank Emi had refused to answer the questions, instead writing that "under the present circumstances" he was unable to complete the form. He posted fliers around camp advising others to do the same. Kiyoshi Okamoto had already established himself as a prominent figure in Heart Mountain, having helped organize a "Congress of American Citizens" to protest the lack of information provided by the WRA and the military in their administration of the "registration" process. Okamoto continued to publicly protest the loyalty questionnaire and the general infringement of Nisei citizens' rights in camp, dubbing himself a "Fair Play Committee of One" in November 1943. Emi and several others approached Okamoto later that year and began holding informal meetings to discuss their complaints against the WRA and possible courses of action.

The meetings remained fairly small until early 1944, when Nisei men, demoted to 4-C class after Pearl Harbor, were added to the draft pool and began receiving induction notices in camp. The Fair Play Committee formally elected the seven founders (Okamoto, Emi, Sam Horino, Guntaro Kubota, Paul Nakadate, Min Tamesa, and Ben Wakaye) as its steering committee on January 26. Its first public meeting was held in a mess hall on February 8, 1944 and sixty young men showed up to listen to Committee leaders' arguments against the forced conscription of citizens who had been stripped of their rights. As the number of Heart Mountain draftees grew, so did interest in the Fair Play Committee, and a March 1 rally attracted over 400 attendees. Public meetings continued. The Committee became a formal membership organization, with a $2 fee for joining and a requirement that all members be citizens loyal to the United States and willing to serve if their rights were restored.

== Draft resistance and prosecution ==
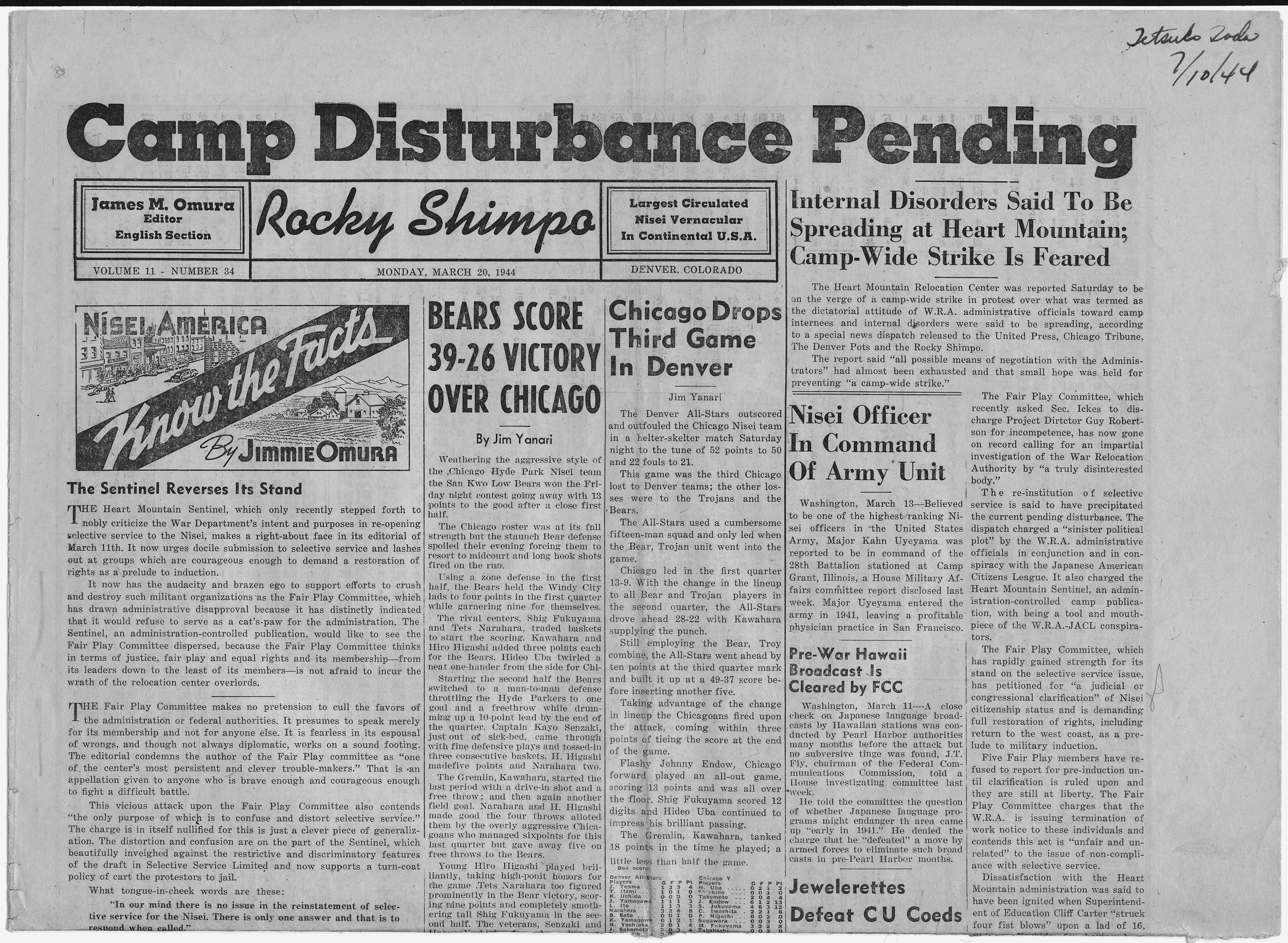
Rocky Shimpo article on the Fair Play Committee and opposition to the draft in Heart Mountain (NARA)

The Fair Play Committee began to meet regularly in February 1944, holding evening meetings in Heart Mountain mess halls which were well attended by young men questioning whether to report for their pre-induction physicals as mandated by the government. These early meetings addressed the unconstitutionality of the eviction from the West Coast, the discrimination in allowing Nisei to serve only in a segregated battalion, and the lack of information on if and when they would be released from camp. Okamoto, Emi and the other FPC leaders at first avoided directly advising against compliance with the draft, fearing reprisal from military or WRA officials (then busy removing Japanese American protestors deemed "disloyal" to the maximum security Tule Lake Segregation Center).

On March 4, 1944 the Committee changed tactics and publicized their intention to "refuse to go to the physical examination or to the induction if or when we are called in order to contest the issue." On March 6, the first two resisters refused to report for their physicals, and by the end of the week they were joined by ten others.

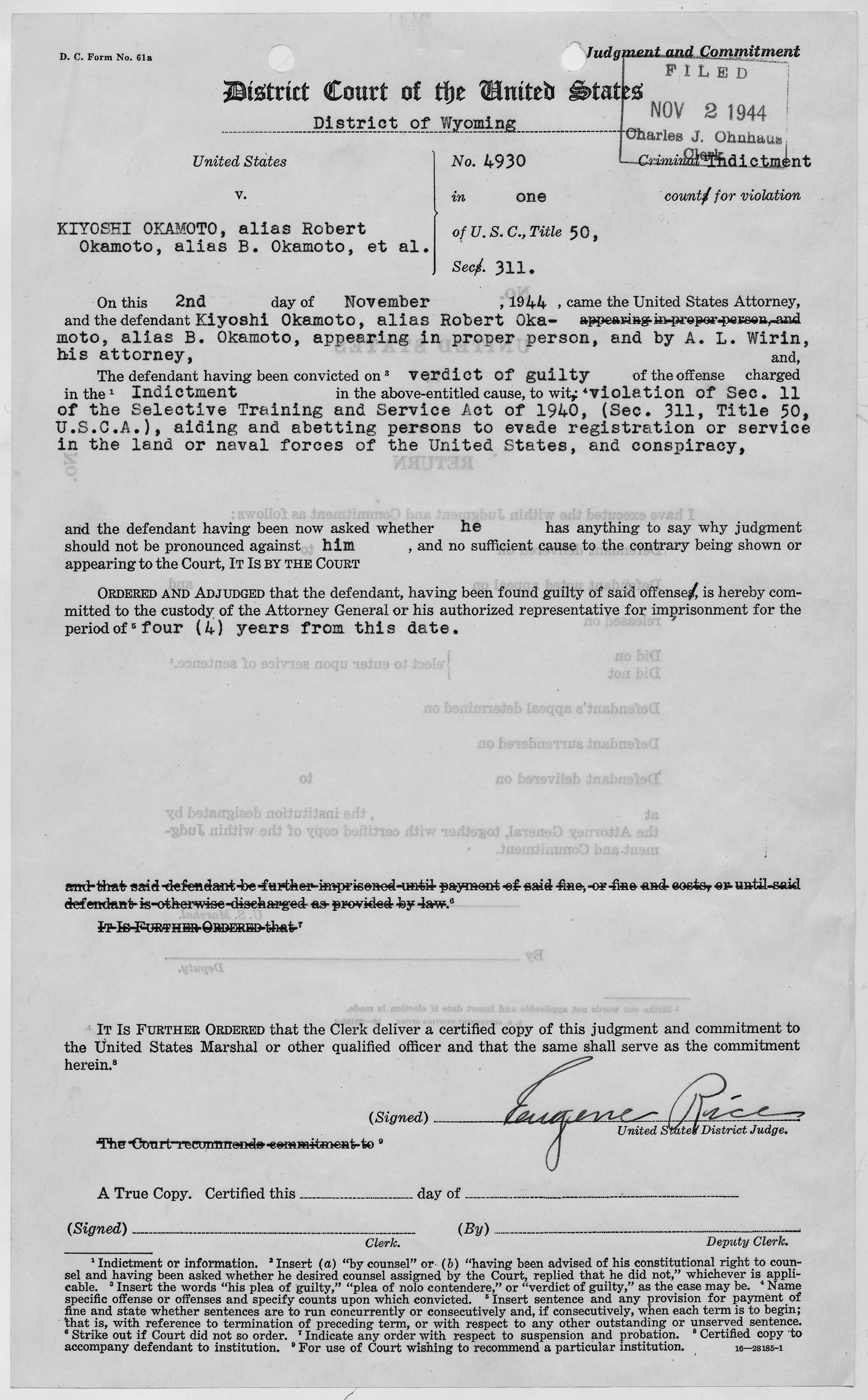
Judgement and commitment against Kiyoshi Okamoto after his conviction (NARA)

Many Japanese Americans in the camp and, as the story spread, outside of it were critical of the organization's stance and the individual decisions to disobey draft orders. The inmate-run newspaper, the Heart Mountain Sentinel, published editorials and public letters railing against the Fair Play Committee. As attendance at the FPC meetings and the number of protesters grew, Sentinel articles described Fair Play members as "warp-minded" and "deluded youths" who "lacked both physical and moral courage." The Japanese American Citizens League's (JACL) national paper, the Pacific Citizen, likewise editorialized against the resisters.

After close to a month of inaction from the government, U.S. Marshals entered the camp on March 25, 1944 and arrested the first twelve draft resisters. While the arrested resisters awaited hearings in local jails, Frank Emi and two other Fair Play leaders tried to walk out of Heart Mountain (knowing they would be stopped) to protest their status as prisoners. Camp administrators transferred Kiyoshi Okamoto to Tule Lake. Still, the number of young men disobeying draft orders swelled throughout April, reaching sixty-three by June.

During this period, Okamoto wrote to Roger N. Baldwin, National Director of the American Civil Liberties Union (ACLU), seeking "legal assistance in challenging the constitutionality of drafting internees." Baldwin responded in a letter which was reprinted by the JACL in its Bulletin #9 of April 11, 1944 and which he released to the press that same day. He said, "The men who have refused to accept military draft are within their rights, but they of course must take the consequences. They doubtless have a strong moral case, but no legal case at all." He refused to have the ACLU represent them. According to documentation revealed by historian Roger Daniels, the JACL and ACLU collaborated in this response and in its publicity to impede the appeal of the draft resisters.

Adding to the anti-resister rhetoric of the ACLU's publicized legal position, a Pacific Citizen editorial published on April 8, 1944 referred to the resisters as "draft dodgers" who had "injured the cause of loyal Japanese Americans everywhere." (By this time the number of Heart Mountain inmates refusing induction had topped forty.) Ben Kuroki, a Japanese American war hero who had earlier paid a WRA- and JACL-sponsored visit to Heart Mountain to help with recruiting, said of the resisters: "These men are Fascists in my estimation and no good to my country. They have torn down all the rest of us have tried to do." At the same time, however, James Omura of the Denver-based Rocky Shimpo published editorials of his own that argued in support of the FPC demand that Nisei rights be restored prior to their conscription, countering the pro-administration publications.

In the largest federal trial in Wyoming history, the sixty-three arrested resisters were convicted of felony draft evasion and, at the JACL's suggestion, sedition. Judge Thomas Blake Kennedy (who referred to the defendants as "you Jap boys") sentenced them to three years in federal prison. On July 1, 1944, the Heart Mountain Sentinel included an editorial on the trial entitled "Years of Uselessness," in which it described "the action of the 63 defendants as being as serious an attack on the integrity of all nisei as the sneak attack on Pearl Harbor." Twenty-two young men were prosecuted in a subsequent trial and received the same sentence, bringing the total number of draft resisters in Heart Mountain to eighty-five.

On May 10, 1944, the seven leaders of the Fair Play Committee and James Omura, who had been forced to resign from the Rocky Shimpo in April, were indicted by a Wyoming federal grand jury. In July they were arrested for unlawful conspiracy to counsel, aid and abet violations of the Selective Service Act. (Omura and the FPC leaders were older than the eighty-five others and had not technically violated any induction orders because they were not subject to the draft; the conspiracy charge allowed the government to prosecute them anyway.) Their case was heard before a Cheyenne jury in October 1944; Omura was acquitted, while the seven Fair Play leaders were found guilty and sentenced to two to four years in federal prison.

== After the war ==
In 1945, the Denver Court of Appeals overturned the convictions of the seven Fair Play Committee leaders, after discovering that the jurors in their original trial had been instructed not to consider civil disobedience as a valid defense. The eighty-five younger Fair Play members remained in prison after the U.S. Supreme Court declined to hear Min Tamesa's appeal on their behalf, although many received an early release for good behavior in July 1946. The rest of the Heart Mountain resisters, as well as more than 200 from other camps who had been prosecuted and imprisoned, were not released until December 1947, when President Harry Truman granted them a full pardon.

The West Coast was reopened to Japanese American settlement on January 2, 1945. Over the next several months, the WRA concentration camps slowly emptied as inmates either returned to their prewar hometowns or resettled in Midwest or East Coast hubs such as Chicago and New York. Early returnees faced severe housing and job shortages, which were exacerbated by lingering racial prejudice; upon their release, the Fair Play members encountered not only a difficult job market and discriminatory real estate practices, but widespread hostility from other Japanese Americans. The heroic exploits of the 100th Infantry Battalion and the 442nd, such as the rescue of the Lost Battalion and the liberation of a Dachau sub-camp, had been widely publicized during the war; the Nisei soldiers were credited with helping to end the incarceration by spreading a positive image of patriotic Japanese Americans. The draft resisters, on the other hand, were considered by many to have worked against this goal and created additional hardships for Japanese Americans who wanted to be perceived as loyal. Additionally, the JACL had in February 1946 voted to formally and publicly condemn the Fair Play Committee and all those who had in some way protested their wartime incarceration, a position the organization would maintain for over half a century.

Despite tensions within the larger community, former FPC members resettled and went on with their lives, although most did not speak about their wartime resistance. Public opinion remained mostly against the Committee until the 1970s and 1980s, when Sansei activists involved in the movement to obtain redress for the wartime incarceration began to reexamine the circumstances of their resistance. (This movement culminated in the Civil Liberties Act of 1988, which granted a formal apology and reparations to camp survivors.) Interest in the Fair Play resisters from community members and Asian American Studies scholars increased in the following decades. By the 1990s, many Nisei veterans associations had come to see the other group as having exercised a different kind of courage and patriotism during the war (although this view was by no means universal).

Around this time the JACL began to approach reconciliation with the resisters. In 1994, Frank Emi and Mits Koshiyama (another Fair Play member) were invited to speak at the organization's national convention, although their attendance sparked no action other than the firing of the JACL staff who had invited them. Five years later, a resolution to apologize to draft resisters was introduced at a regional meeting of the JACL's Central California branch, but it was quickly killed by opposing members. A successful resolution was finally brought before the national board in 1999 and narrowly passed a vote at the JACL's 2000 convention. In May 2002, the JACL held a public ceremony to apologize to the Fair Play Committee and other wartime resisters.

The last surviving member of the Heart Mountain Fair Play Committee, Frank Emi, died December 1, 2010.

== Representation in other media ==
- John Okada's novel, No-No Boy (1956), set in postwar Seattle, centers around a protagonist who had been imprisoned for refusing the draft.
- Frank Abe, Conscience and the Constitution, PBS, 2000
- Allegiance (2013), musical that premiered in San Diego, California, due to open on Broadway

== See also ==
- Internment of Japanese Americans
- Heart Mountain War Relocation Center
- Frank S. Emi
