= Zenshuji Soto Misson =

Soto Zen Buddhist temple in Los Angeles, United States

Coordinates: 34.048291°N 118.236313°W

Zenshuji Soto Mission
- 曹洞宗北米両大本山別院禅宗寺 (Sōtōshū Hokubei Ryōdaihonzan betsuin Zenshūji))
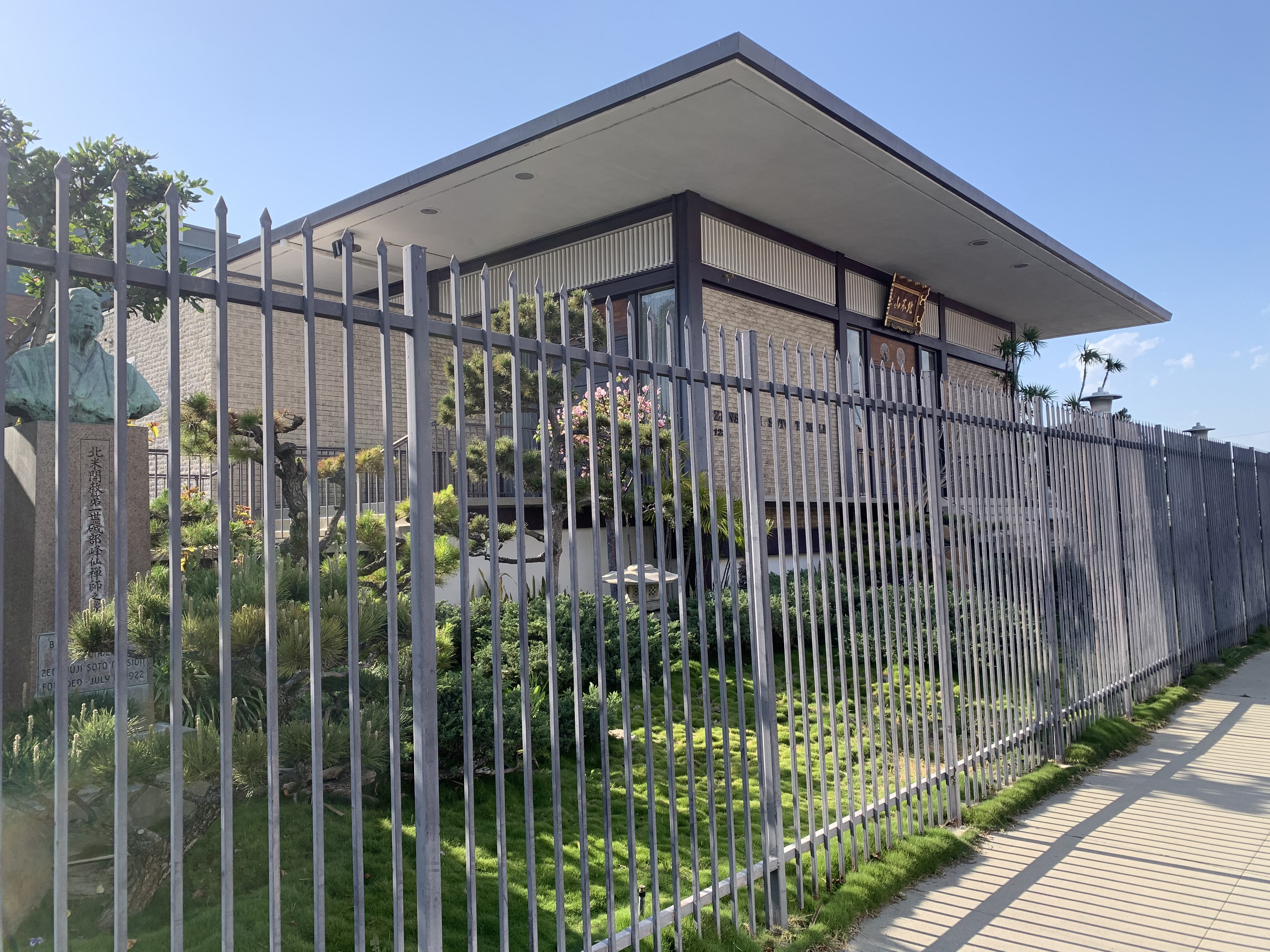

Religion
- Affiliation: Soto Zen Buddhism

Location
- Location: 123 S Hewitt St, Los Angeles, California 90012
- State: California
- Country: United States
- Interactive map of Zenshuji Soto Mission

Architecture
- Established: 1922

Zenshuji Soto Mission (Japanese: 曹洞宗北米両大本山別院禅宗寺 (Sōtōshū Hokubei Ryōdaihonzan betsuin Zenshūji)), established in 1922 in the Little Tokyo section of Los Angeles, California, was the first Soto Zen Buddhist temple in North America. Today, it is the North American headquarters for Soto Zen, under the guidance of Sotoshu Shumucho (the headquarters of Soto Zen in Japan), and is a direct branch of Eiheiji and Sojiji (the two head temples in Japan).

== Temple practice ==
Zenshuji follows the 2,500-year-old teachings of Gautama Buddha as passed down by Koso Dogen Zenji (1200–1253) and Taiso Keizan Zenji (1268–1325) who are recognized as the founding patriarchs of Soto Zen. The essence of Soto Zen was transmitted during the Kamakura period in Japan approximately eight hundred years ago by Dogen Zenji.

Keizan Zenji further enhanced the School and significantly increased its accessibility and popularity with lay people. In 1244, Dogen Zenji established Eiheiji Temple in present-day Fukui Prefecture. Later, in 1321, Keizan Zenji established Sojiji Temple in present-day Kanagawa Prefecture. Today, Eiheiji and Sojiji still serve as the head temples / monasteries for the Soto Zen school of Buddhism.

== Temple history ==
In 1922, a few years after attending the Panama–Pacific International Exposition in San Francisco, Rev. Hosen Isobe established the Zenshuji Soto Mission in a Los Angeles apartment. Anti-immigration laws at that time made it extremely difficult for people of Japanese descent to purchase land in the United States. Nonetheless, in 1923, land was purchased and construction of a temple was eventually completed in 1926. In 1927, Zenshuji was recognized as a non-profit organization by the United States. In 1937, Zenshuji formally became the North America Headquarters for Soto Zen and a direct branch of Eiheiji and Sojiji.

Bishop Daito Suzuki became the third head priest on Rohatsu which fell on December 8, 1941. During World War II, when about 110,000 people of Japanese heritage were sent to detention camps, Zenshuji was temporarily closed. A Hindu temple took over the deed and a Christian group used it for worship during the war. When the war ended, Bishop Daito Suzuki returned to Zenshuji and worked on its restoration.

Rev. Koun Yamada served as Bishop of North America at Zenshuji for almost four years prior to his return to Japan to become president of Komazawa University and eventually abbot of Eiheiji.

Another priest that served at Zenshuji during the 1960s was Dr. Wako Kazumitsu Kato. Dr. Kato went on to teach and hold academic positions at San Francisco State University, University of California, Berkeley, California State University, Los Angeles, and University of California, Los Angeles. He also served as Dean of International Studies at the Nagoya University of Foreign Studies for seven years. Dr. Kato is still actively involved at Zenshuji.

Bishop Kenko Yamashita is also a key figure in Zenshuji's history; having served as general supervisor for 26 years from the late 1960s through the mid-1980s.

== Zenshuji Soto Misson today ==
Rev. Shumyo Kojima keeps an office at Zenshuji and frequently presides over various ceremonies and services at the temple. Rev. Shumyo Kojima is chartered with Zenshuji's ongoing mission to offer the ethnically diverse area of Los Angeles guidance in the practice of Soto Zen to those interested in satisfying a spiritual, intellectual, or social need.

== See also ==
- Shuichi Thomas Kurai
- Timeline of Zen Buddhism in the United States
