= David Avocado Wolfe =

American author and conspiracy theorist (born 1970)

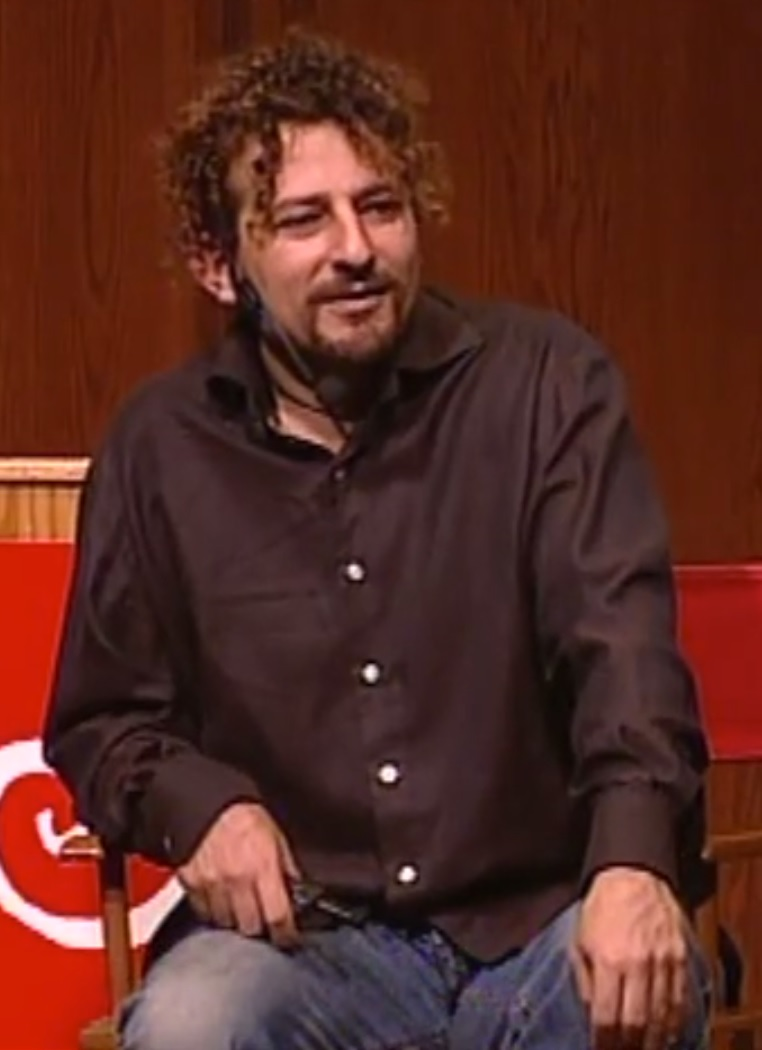
- Wolfe speaks at the Institute for Integrative Nutrition in 2011
- Born: San Diego, California
- Education: University of California, Santa Barbara; University of San Diego
- Occupations: Author, spokesman, social media influencer
- Known for: Activism for raw food, anti-vaccination movement

David "Avocado" Wolfe is an American conspiracy theorist. He promotes a variety of pseudoscientific ideas such as raw foodism, alternative medicine, and anti-vaccine sentiment. He has been described as "[o]ne of Facebook's most ubiquitous public figures" as well as an "internationally renowned conspiracy theorist" and a "huckster".

== Early life ==
Wolfe grew up in San Diego, California, and graduated from the University of California, Santa Barbara, where he studied mechanical and environmental engineering and political science. Afterwards, he earned a Juris Doctor degree at the University of San Diego. According to Wolfe, he became intolerant of dairy when he was 18 and stopped consuming it, which led him to explore various diets and by the time he was 24 he was on an organic, raw food diet. He introduced the diet to Thor Bazler (then known as Stephen Arlin), who had attended the same high school as Wolfe, and this led to the founding of their company Nature's First Law.

== Career ==
Thor Bazler and Wolfe co-founded the company Nature's First Law in 1995. The company sold organic food and products related to raw foodism. Wolfe and Bazler started the company selling products out of their car trunks; by 2005 the company had 23 employees and around $6 million in revenue, and had profits of $1.2 million in 2004. The company grew in part by endorsements from celebrities. By 2005 Wolfe had become an evangelist for raw foods, travelling and speaking, while Bazler stayed in San Diego and tended to the Nature's First Law business. In 2007 Nature's First Law changed its name to Sunfood Nutrition. The relationship between Wolfe and Sunfood ended at least by 2011, and there was litigation involving personality rights. In 2012 Sunfood claimed Wolfe was defaming it.

While affiliated with Sunfood Nutrition, Wolfe also co-founded the company Sacred Chocolate in 2006 with Steve Adler, which sells specialized raw chocolate products.

New Horizon Health, Inc. was founded in 2009 and runs websites and businesses for which Wolfe is the "celebrity spokesperson": the e-commerce site Longevity Warehouse, and the subscription-based longevity web magazine The Best Day Ever, which Wolfe says he co-founded. New Horizon Health had $7.6M in revenue in 2013.

Wolfe has been the spokesman for Magic Bullet since 2012, and has appeared in several infomercials promoting the product. Wolfe has authored and co-authored several books promoting foods and offering diet advice.

=== Other activities ===
Wolfe is president of the Fruit Tree Planting Foundation, which received its IRS nonprofit certification in 2002.

In 2004, Wolfe starred on the reality TV show Mad Mad House regularly as the naturist "alt", alternative lifestyle practitioners who served as hosts and judges for the contestant "guests". In 2004 Wolfe was part of a rock band called The Healing Waters that travelled the country in a vegetable-oil-powered bus and performed songs including "Raw Food Girl" and "Bye Bye Burger World".

== Conspiracy theories and pseudoscientific claims ==
Wolfe has been criticized for promoting pseudoscience and "harmful scientific flimflam". He has been accused of convincing people they can prevent or cure real ailments with ineffective supplements and demonizing life-saving vaccines and cancer treatments. In addition, he has made numerous statements about medical treatments that are not in keeping with the scientific and medical literature.

=== Anti-vaccine advocacy ===
Wolfe is a prominent supporter of the anti-vaccine or "anti-vax" movement. He has baselessly claimed that vaccines cause autism or otherwise harm or kill people and may not work. This claim has been discredited. Wolfe's anti-vaccination stance led to protests during a speaking tour of Australia in 2017, which had been funded in part by anti-vaccination groups. This led to the cancellation of a scheduled event after the withdrawal of a sponsor, and at least one more after a venue cancelled the booking.

=== Cancer ===
Wolfe supports the unfounded claims that cancer research and modern cancer treatments are "largely a fraud". Wolfe's various websites and online stores sell alternative products he claims treat or prevents cancer. Wolfe advocates that people with cancer treat it with dietary supplements.

=== Raw foodism and detoxification ===
Wolfe promotes a diet based on unprocessed foods, stating that this has a "detoxification" effect. Detoxification has been found to be unscientific and lacking in evidence.

The British Dietetic Association has described raw foodism as a fad diet. Claims held by raw food proponents are pseudoscientific.

=== COVID-19 ===
Wolfe is a frequent COVID-19 conspiracy theorist and anti-mask activist. He has spoken at anti-mask rallies and has repeatedly claimed without evidence that COVID-19 was artificially created.

Wolfe advertises on Facebook his colloidal silver products, despite the National Institutes of Health's warning that they are "not safe or effective for treating any disease or condition". He called his brand his "#1 recommendation under the current crisis." Medical professionals describe these sorts of treatments as a potentially harmful false cure.

=== Other pseudoscientific claims ===
Wolfe believes that gravity is a toxin and that "water would levitate right off the Earth" if the oceans were not salty. He claims that chemtrails exist, that the Earth is flat, and that solar panels drain the Sun's power.

Furthermore, he has advertised deer antler spray as being "levitational" and an "androgenic force."
