= Don Henrie =

American television personality

- Born: August 27, 1975 (age 50); San Diego, California
- Other names: The Vampire Don
- Occupations: Television personality; model; engineer
- Known for: Reality TV participant
- Title: The Vampire Emperor

Donald Wayne Henrie (born August 27, 1975), also known as "The Vampire Don", is known for his role in the SyFy reality show Mad Mad House, which first aired March 4, 2004. Prior to this, he worked nights as a micro electronics engineer in San Diego.

== Media appearances ==
Since Mad Mad, Henrie has made many appearances in television documentaries on various networks. He has also talked with and been featured in numerous publications regarding his career and his perspective on the vampire lifestyle.

He has appeared on the National Geographic show Is It Real? Vampires. Another notable documentary appearance includes the feature documentary Vampyres, where he appears alongside various other members of the vampire community. He was also featured in the book Vampire Nation. Henrie also made a guest appearance in the music video for the song "Shadow Dancer" by gothic metal band Urn.

He has been interviewed and featured by MaximOnline, Metro UK, on a special episode of the Maury Show, and in 2008 appeared on the season 4 Halloween special of the Tyra Banks Show.
