= Mad Mad House =

- Title card
- Created by: Arthur Smith; Kent Weed
- Starring: Fiona Horne; David "Avocado" Wolfe; Art Aguirre; Don Henrie; Ta'Shia Asanti
- Country of origin: United States
- No. of seasons: 1
- No. of episodes: 10

Production
- Running time: 60 minutes
- Production companies: A. Smith & Co. Productions

Original release
- Network: Sci Fi
- Release: March 4 – April 29, 2004

Mad Mad House is an American reality television series about a group of ten contestants competing for $100,000. The contestants live together in a house inhabited by another group of people known as the alts (for their alternative lifestyles). The alts voted the contestants off by judging them on their ability to perform "trials" which were based loosely on the practices of each alt's lifestyle, and their behavior and attitude with the other guests. The show aired on the Sci Fi Channel in the United States and on Space in Canada. Reruns have also been aired on Fox Reality Channel.

== Alts ==
- Fiona Horne (The Witch)
- David "Avocado" Wolfe (The Naturist)
- Art Aguirre (The Modern Primitive)
- Don Henrie (The Vampire)
- "Iya" Ta'Shia Asanti (The Voodoo Priestess)

== Guests ==
Name	Age	Profession	Hometown
Bonnie Dobkin	50	Book Editor	Arlington Heights, Illinois
Brent Ellis	22	Student	Southlake, Texas
Eric Lindquist	28	Assistant Sports Agent	North Andover, Massachusetts
Hamin Phillips	25	Factory Technician	Racine, Wisconsin
Jamie Ethridge	31	Exotic Dancer	Dallas, Texas
Kelly Keefe	23	Political Campaigner	New York City, New York
Loana Huynh	23	Media Researcher	Chicago, Illinois
Nichole Ferrera	30	Retail Sales Manager	Malibu, California
Noel Shenkel	25	Janitor	Strongsville, Ohio
Tim McGhee	44	Horse Rancher	Kennett, Missouri

== Episode list ==
Number	Title	Air date	Showcase	Trial	Eliminated
1	"Let the Madness Begin"	March 4, 2004	Ta'shia performs a voodoo rite. Several of the guests refuse to participate.	Vampire: The guests must retrieve objects associated with vampire myths (crosses, garlic and toy bats) from a "bloodbath" and place them in the chalice of the guest they want to lose the challenge. At the end of the trial, Brent has the fewest objects in his chalice and wins the challenge.	Hamin. Brent as the trial winner broke a tie between Hamin and Loana.
2	"Kelly's Barking Mad"	March 11, 2004	Fiona leads a ritual in which the guests are challenged to confront and release their fears.	Naturist: "Nude Concentration." Twenty of Avocado's naturist friends are wearing loin cloths which conceal pictures of raw foods. The guests seek matching pairs of pictures. Nichole wins the trial in a tie-breaker with Tim.	Kelly
3	"We Are Goddesses, Damn It!"	March 18, 2004	There is no showcase, but Fiona conducts a "Goddess ritual" with the female guests.	Voodoo: Ta'shia places the guests in pits and covers them in substances important in voodoo rituals, including animal organs, honey and feathers. The guests must find five sacred items and place them on Ta'shia's altar. The winner is Bonnie.	Brent
4	"The Alts Get Even"	March 25, 2004	Avocado takes the guests on a nature walk, where they locate and eat a variety of edible wild plants.	Modern Primitive: The guests see a tower of cages, each smaller than the one below. The guests are confined together in the first cage until one guest asks to be released. As each guest leaves, the remaining guests are moved to the next higher and smaller cage. Tim wins the challenge.	Bonnie
5	"Hanging Around"	April 1, 2004	Art demonstrates a suspension ritual, suspending himself from hooks through the flesh of his back.	Witch: Evoking cord magic, the guests must work in pairs to untie a series of knots, retrieve an athame and place it on Fiona's altar. However, only one guest of the winning pair can win so the team has to decide the winner. Eric and Loana win and Loana is safe.	Tim
6	"Don Drinks and Drains"	April 8, 2004	Don performs a blood-drinking ritual and drains energy from Noel.	Naturist: Each guest is given four articles of clothing. Avocado shows them four species of plants and the guests must search the grounds for them. With each plant they bring back they must remove an article of clothing. Nichole wins the challenge.	No one. The alts have the guests give each other necklaces. Noel receives the most but the alts announce that only they may eliminate anyone so he is safe.
7	"Blood Guzzlers"	April 15, 2004	There is no showcase, but the alts take the guests shopping for new clothes for Don's trial.	Vampire: the guests assign each other glasses of blood they must drink. The first to drink all of their blood wins. Loana is the winner. Because no one was eliminated in the last episode, Nichole remains safe from elimination.	Noel
8	"Thee Shall Hang!"	April 22, 2004	Avocado provides a showcase on raw food in a picnic setting.	Witch: Fiona asks the guests trivia questions about former guests. Three wrong answers and the contestant is "hanged" (dropped into the pool with a noose around their necks). Nichole wins the challenge.	Loana
9	"Mad Mad Finale" (part 1)	April 29, 2004	None. The alts and guests go bowling and Don wins.	Modern Primitive: The guests must stand on hooks suspended from chains for as long as they can. As the challenge continues weights are attached to the guests. Jamie wins the challenge.	Eric
10	"Mad Mad Finale" (part 2)	April 29, 2004	None. The remaining guests are instead subjected to a "rite of passage" by each alt.	None. The remaining guests are instead subjected to a "rite of passage" by each alt.	Nichole; Jamie wins the $100,000 prize

== Eliminations table ==
	Episode 1	Episode 2	Episode 3	Episode 4	Episode 5	Episode 6	Episode 7	Episode 8	Episode 9	Episode 10
Fiona	Loana	Tim	Brent	Nichole	Tim		Noel	Jamie	Nichole	Nichole
Art	Kelly	Kelly	Brent	Bonnie	Tim		Eric	Loana	Eric	Jamie
Don	Loana	Brent	Brent	Bonnie	Nichole		Eric	Loana	Nichole	Nichole
Ta'Shia	Hamin	Kelly	Eric	Bonnie	Jamie		Noel	Jamie	Eric	Jamie
Avocado	Hamin	Loana	Brent	Jamie	Tim		Noel	Loana	Eric	Nichole
Jamie						Noel				Winner
Nichole						Loana				Runner-up
Eric						Noel				Banished
Loana						Noel			Banished	
Noel						Eric		Banished		
Tim						Banished				
Bonnie					Banished					
Brent	Hamin			Banished						
Kelly			Banished							
Hamin		Banished								
Notes	none					1	none			
Banished	Hamin	Kelly	Brent	Bonnie	Tim		Noel	Loana	Eric	Nichole
Banished	Hamin	Kelly	Brent	Bonnie	Tim		Noel	Loana	Eric	Jamie

Color key

– Trial Winner

=== Notes ===
- ^Note 1: The Alts did not vote this episode, instead choosing to make the remaining guests vote for each other.

== Critical response ==
David Bianculli of the Daily News called Mad Mad House a "bad bad show" (a bon mot that other reviewers would also make). Comparing the series to previous ones produced by Smith and Weed, including Paradise Hotel and Forever Eden, Bianculli pronounced Mad Mad House to be "their worst work yet". He mocked the contestants and berated the alts as "losers". Virginia Heffernan of The New York Times found the series "unsettling" and "ghoulish" but wondered if it might lead middle America to examine the casualness of their religious beliefs. The premiere episode drew a rating of 1.57 million viewers.

In February 2004, the National African Religion Congress sued the producers of Mad Mad House saying that it falsely represented Ta'Shia Asanti as a voodoo priestess. The group claimed that her dress identified her as a priestess of Yemoja of the Ifá tradition of the Yoruba people. The suit sought a court order requiring that the program not identify Asanti as a voodoo priestess. The group dropped the suit two months later after the network agreed to add a disclaimer to its website.

== See also ==
- Vampire film
- List of vampire television series
