= Mitsumyo Tottori =

Mitsumyo Tottori (May 6, 1898 – January 6, 1976) was a Buddhist priest and missionary who was active in Hawaii. He was one of the few Buddhist priests in Hawaii who was not interned during World War II, and is best known for the memorial tablets he created for Japanese American soldiers in the 442nd and 100th.

== Early life and education ==
Tottori was born in Shizuoka, Japan on May 6, 1898. He studied at what is now Shuchiin University, and graduated in 1924. He then studied at the Koyasan before being assigned a mission in Hawaii.

== Hawaii ==
Tottori moved to Hawaii in 1925 and served at the Hawaii Shingon Mission in Honolulu. In 1927 he became the priest at the Komyoji Temple in Wailuku. He met and married Aiko Fujitani before returning to Oahu to serve at the Koshoji Temple in Haleiwa.

Tottori also regularly wrote for the Hawaii Mikkyo, a Buddhist publication. On December 7, 1941, right after the bombing of Pearl Harbor, Tottori was brought in for questioning. He was released a few days later, unlike many other Buddhist priests who were interned for the duration of World War II, because the articles that he wrote for the Hawaii Mikkyo and other publications advocated for the Americanization of Japanese immigrants in much the same way that Yemyo Imamura had.

Throughout the war, Tottori held private services and wrote memorial tablets (Tōba) for Japanese American soldiers who had died on the battlefield. He maintained a prayer book for them regardless of their own religious beliefs. He also gave them posthumous Buddhist names. After World War II, he conducted services for men who died in the Korean War.

In 1946, after World War II ended, Tottori returned to Honolulu and became the bishop of the Hawaii Shingon Mission. He started a temple pilgrimage called the Hichi Kasho Meguri. Pilgrims would travel to seven temples across Hawaii, including the Hawaii Shingon Mission, the McCully Shingon Mission, the Palolo Kannonji, and the Liliha Shingon Mission. He was also awarded the Order of the Sacred Treasure by the Japanese government.

Tottori died on January 6, 1976.
