= Shuichi Thomas Kurai =

- Title: Abbot

Personal life
- Born: December 14, 1947 Katada, Shima-shi, Mie Prefecture, Japan
- Died: June 29, 2018 (age 70) Los Angeles, California, United States
- Children: Garrett Keiichi Kurai
- Occupation: Zen master taiko instructor/performer

Religious life
- Religion: Buddhism
- School: Soto Zen
- Dharma name: Shuichi

Senior posting
- Based in: Montebello, California, United States

Shuichi Thomas Kurai (December 14, 1947—June 29, 2018) was a Japanese-born Soto Zen roshi and head abbot of Sozenji Buddhist Temple in Montebello, California. Raised in a Soto temple in Japan, he moved to California with his parents in 1952, where his father (Reverend Shuyu Kurai) served as priest at the Zenshuji Soto Mission in Little Tokyo. Kurai was a member of the American Zen Teachers Association.

In addition to his role as a Zen teacher, Kurai was a highly skilled musician who taught others to play taiko drums. He founded the Taiko Center of Los Angeles and led the performing group Satori Daiko.

Kurai died on June 29, 2018, at the age of 70 following a diagnosis of adult T-Cell leukemia.
