= Henry Okamura =

American judoka (1924–2005)

Henry Kosaku Okamura (Japanese: 岡村 耕作, January 16, 1924 – May 25, 2005) was an American four time US National Judo Champion.

Okamura co-authored a book in 1960 called How to Improve Your Judo. Okamura was awarded an 8th dan in judo.

Okamura lived in the Manzanar internment camp for Japanese-American citizens during World War II following the enforcement of Executive Order 9066. He suffered a stroke during his later years.

He was married to his wife, Mitsuko and was survived by a daughter, Bonnie; a son, Henry Jr.; a daughter-in-law, Leslie; a brother, James; and two sisters, Marie Yamauchi and Ruth Yamamoto.
