= Solectron =

American electronics manufacturing company

Solectron Corporation

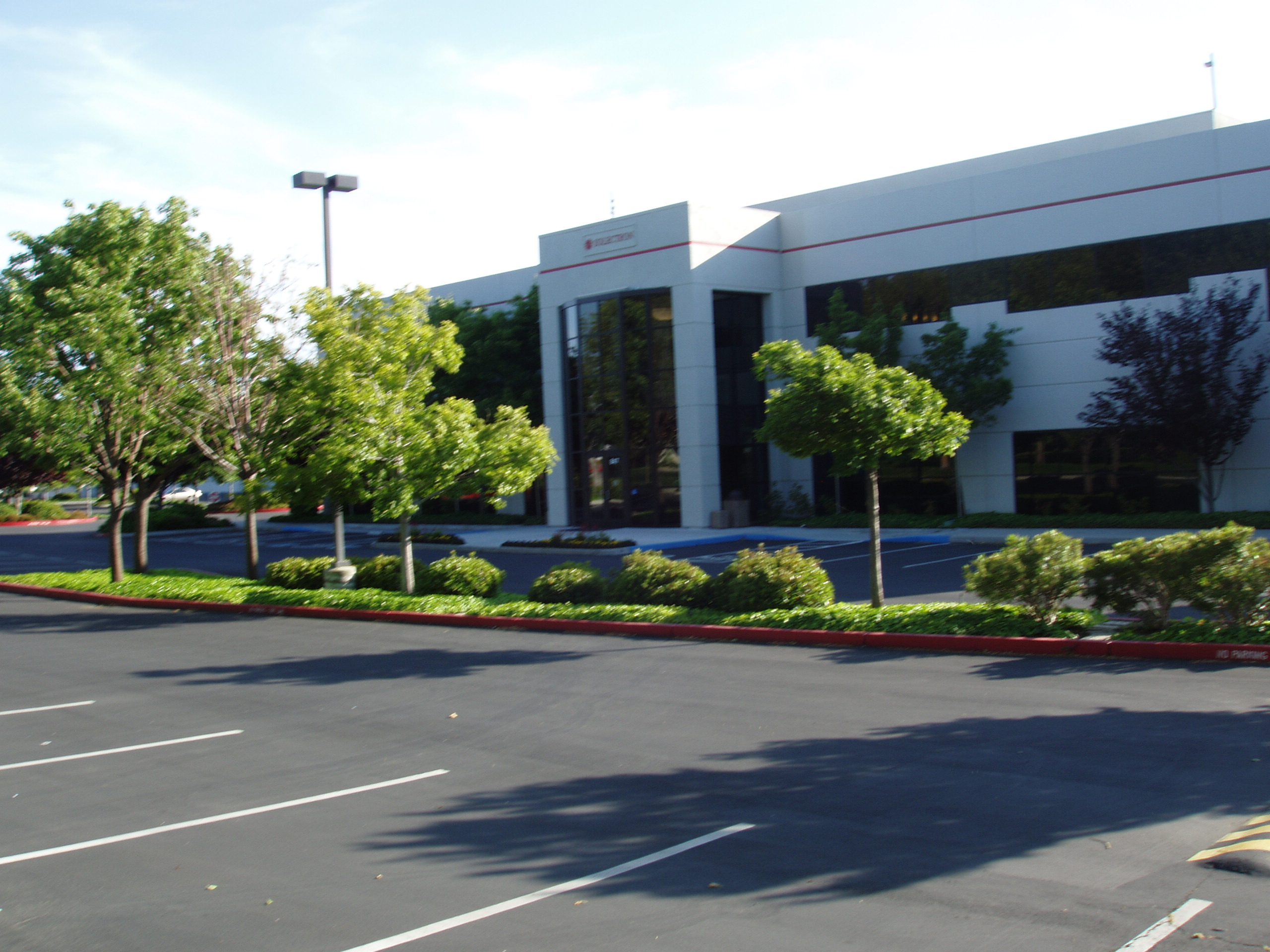
- Headquarters in Milpitas, California
- Company type: Public company
- Traded as: NYSE: SLR
- Industry: Electronics Manufacturing Services, product design and after sales services
- Founded: 1977
- Defunct: 2007
- Fate: liquidated by Flextronics
- Successor: Flex Ltd.
- Products: Consumer Electronics, Routers, Switches, TVs
- Revenue: US$10.56 billion (2006)

Solectron Corporation was an American electronics manufacturing company for original equipment manufacturers (OEMs). Solectron's first customer designed and distributed an electronic controller for solar energy equipment. The name "Solectron" was a portmanteau of the words "solar" and "electronics".

Solectron had sales of around $12 billion a year, and employed 70,000 people in 23 countries. The company was acquired by Flex on October 15, 2007.

== History ==
Solectron was established in 1977 to provide outsourced manufacturing services to third parties. It was a major manufacturer, but you would have not found its name on any products. Solectron founders Roy Kusumoto and Prabhat Jain saw a growing number of electronics companies in California's Silicon Valley. There was a need to provide printed circuit board assembly (PCBA) services, handling the manufacturing overflow from OEMs. Solectron aimed to provide high-tech companies the ability for their products to be produced and delivered more quickly and efficiently than their competition, and believed that their customers needed a greater level of service for assembly and manufacture of printed circuit boards, cellular phones, along the entire product supply chain.

In 2007, Flextronics announced it would buy Solectron for 3.6 billion dollars.
