= Frank S. Emi =

Japanese-American civil rights activist

- Born: Frank Seishi Emi; September 23, 1916; Los Angeles, California, United States
- Died: December 1, 2010 (aged 94); West Covina, California, United States
- Education: Los Angeles City College
- Organization: Heart Mountain Fair Play Committee
- Known for: Fighting effort of the U.S. government to draft Japanese American detainees during World War II

Frank Seishi Emi (Japanese: 江見 誠之, September 23, 1916 – December 1, 2010) was a Japanese American civil rights activist. He was a leading figure of the Heart Mountain Fair Play Committee, an ad hoc group who protested the drafting of Japanese Americans interned during World War II. Emi argued it was unconstitutional to conscript men who had been stripped of their civil rights into military service and advised Nisei who received draft orders to demand they be released from camp before reporting for duty. He was convicted of conspiring to violate the Selective Service Act and served eighteen months of a four-year sentence in federal prison. For many years, Emi and his fellow draft resisters were condemned as troublemakers by the Japanese American Citizens League and the larger Japanese American community, but his legacy has more recently come to be seen as an important example of civil disobedience.

== Early life ==
Frank Seishi Emi was born in Los Angeles on September 23, 1916. When he was four years old, his family moved to the San Fernando Valley, where they farmed and eventually opened a produce market. He attended San Fernando High School for two years, until his family moved again to open a grocery store in Long Beach. He graduated from Long Beach Polytechnic High School and entered the Los Angeles City College's pharmacy program. After his father was seriously injured in a car accident, Emi left school to run the family's produce market in downtown Los Angeles.

By 1941, Emi was running a successful business. He had just invested $25,000 to expand the market when Pearl Harbor was attacked on December 7, 1941. He was not immediately worried, recalling later, "we didn't have an inkling that we ourselves were going to be bothered because we Nisei had been born here in this country and we were citizens." However, after Executive Order 9066 put into motion the removal of Japanese Americans from the West Coast, he was forced to sell the family business for $1,500, about six cents for each dollar of the produce market's real value. Emi moved into his parents' house with his wife and two children once evacuation orders began to circulate in early 1942, to ensure the family would not be separated and sent to different camps. They were held at the hastily constructed Pomona Assembly Center for three months, before being sent to the Heart Mountain Relocation Center, halfway between the cities of Cody and Powell in Wyoming, in September 1942.

== Draft resistance ==
In early 1943, the War Relocation Authority began to distribute a "Leave Clearance Form," better known as the loyalty questionnaire because of two controversial questions that attempted to discern the loyalty of imprisoned Japanese Americans. Question 27 asked whether men would be willing to serve in the armed forces, while Question 28 asked inmates to forswear their allegiance to the Emperor of Japan. While many gave unqualified affirmative responses, many, like Emi, were confused and offended by the questions' implications. Emi's response to both was, "Under the present conditions and circumstances, I am unable to answer this question," and he encouraged others to do the same, posting fliers with suggested answers around Heart Mountain. Also in 1943, with new soldiers to replace those who had died in combat in high demand, the previous restrictions against Nisei men (listed as enemy aliens ineligible for service after Pearl Harbor) were set aside in order to create a segregated unit of Japanese American volunteers. Given the nickname "Go For Broke" for its soldier's willingness to put their lives at risk in battle, the unit suffered an extremely high casualty rate and soon required fresh troops. A 1944 amendment to the Selective Service Act reinstated the draft for men in camp when only 1,181 inmates volunteered.

Emi and five other Heart Mountain inmates joined Kiyoshi Okamoto, a vocal protestor against the loyalty questionnaire and the incarceration who called himself a "Fair Play Committee of One," to form the Heart Mountain Fair Play Committee. The Committee encouraged other inmates to refuse military service until their full citizenship rights were restored, and held public meetings to discuss the unconstitutionality of their confinement. As more young men joined the committee and refused to comply with draft orders, the federal government took action.

On March 25, 1944, twelve Heart Mountain inmates who had not reported for their draft physicals were arrested by U.S. Marshals. Undeterred, more young men followed their example, and Emi and two other Committee members who had not received drafted notices (Emi was married with children) attempted to walk out of camp to highlight their status as prisoners. Later that year, sixty-three Heart Mountain resisters were arrested after failing to show up for their induction and were subsequently tried in federal court and convicted of felony draft evasion and, at the suggestion of the Japanese American Citizens League, whose leaders had lobbied the government to permit Nisei men to join the war effort, the added charge of sedition. A total of 300 draft resisters from Heart Mountain and seven other WRA camps were arrested and stood trial for these charges; almost all served at least two years in federal prison. The seven leaders of the Fair Play Committee, who were not eligible for the draft because of their age or domestic status, were convicted of conspiracy to violate the Selective Service Act and sentenced to four years in federal prison. Emi served 18 months at the U.S. Penitentiary at Leavenworth, Kansas, before his and the other leader's sentences were overturned by a federal appeals court in December 1945.

== Post-war legacy ==
Outside prison, Emi and his fellow draft resisters found that most of their peers viewed them with disdain and considered their wartime resistance a sign of disloyalty and cowardice, a stain on the Japanese American community in general and the legacy of the 442nd Regimental Combat Team in particular. This stigma would not begin to change until the late 1970s and early 1980s, when a younger generation of Sansei began to push for redress and a reexamination of their parents' and grandparents' wartime experiences. In 2000, the Japanese American Citizens League reversed their stance and offered Emi and the other resisters a formal apology.

After the war, Frank Emi worked as a gardener and a grocery clerk before beginning a career with the postal service. After retiring from the post office, he worked at a state unemployment office until 1982. Promoted to 8th-degree black belt in 2008, he was also the head instructor of the Hollywood Judo Dojo and was credited for producing several national judo athletes.

Emi died on December 1, 2010, in West Covina, California, the last surviving member of the Heart Mountain Fair Play Committee.

== In Culture ==
The Little-Known Heroes: Frank Emi, a children's picture book by Kaushay and Spencer Ford, was published in 2021.
