= James Omura =

American journalist (1912–1994)

James Yutaka Matsumoto Omura (November 17, 1912 – June 20, 1994) was an American newspaper editor. He was the English language editor of the Rocky Shimpo newspaper in Denver, Colorado, during World War II. He criticized the internment of Japanese Americans and supported the Nisei draft resisters. Omura's support for active resistance brought him into conflict with the Japanese American Citizens League (JACL), which preached passive conformity with the federal government.

== Childhood ==
James Omura was born in Winslow, Bainbridge Island, in the state of Washington. He was one of six children born to father Tsurumatsu Matsumoto and mother Harue (née Higashi).

When Omura was six years old, his mother became ill and returned to Japan with the three youngest children. When the three older children were given the option of going to Japan with their mother, they chose to stay in the United States for fear they could never return.

== Current Life ==
Omura founded Current Life in October 1940 with his own income. The objective of this magazine was to present the Nisei in a positive light.

Omura was the editor and publisher of Current Life, based in San Francisco, California, when he gave testimony before the Tolan Committee National Defense Migration Hearings before the Select Committee Investigating National Defense Migration on February 23, 1942.

== Tolan Committee ==
Following the Japanese attack on Pearl Harbor on December 7, 1941, the question of the loyalty of the Nisei to the United States had been a huge issue, culminating in the decision to incarcerate all persons of Japanese ancestry in American concentration camps.

Omura stated before the select committee of the 77th House of Representatives, that he was opposed to the mass incarceration of all American citizens of Japanese descent, based on inconclusive proof of their loyalty to the United States.

== Rocky Shimpo ==
On March 29, 1942, Omura moved to Denver, Colorado, during the removal of people of Japanese ancestry from the west coast of the United States. Those who were unable to relocate were sent to hastily constructed projects known as War Relocation Centers (WRC) which served as way-stations for those who found residency elsewhere, but were concentration camps for the majority who could not find alternative accommodation. At this Denver newspaper, Omura became a voice of dissent.

The Japanese American Citizens League (JACL) became the de facto leadership for people of Japanese ancestry, when the previous leaders, the Issei (first-generation Japanese immigrants) parents were taken into custody by the U.S. government. The Nisei (second-generation American citizens of Japanese heritage) became more vocal opponents of American policy on Japanese–Americans.

Omura published articles opposing the JACL, for which he was singled-out as 'Public Enemy Number One of the JACL'.

== Arrest ==
James Omura was arrested on July 20, 1944, for conspiracy to counsel draft evasion. Although a Wyoming grand jury indicted him, he was acquitted on November 1, 1944, on his first amendment right to free speech as a newspaperman. Judge T. Blake Kennedy confessed to defense attorney Sidney Jacobs that if the defendant had been convicted by the jury, he would have sustained it, even though he would be reversed by a higher court.

== Exile ==
During World War II, Japanese community opinion sided with the critical stand the Rocky Shimpo took toward the forced resettlement and the drafting of Nisei soldiers from the concentration camps. After the war, the Japanese community shifted their opinion in favor of the soldiers of the 100th Infantry Battalion and the 442nd Regimental Combat Team, in effect endorsing the position of the JACL – the organization that had pushed for the drafting of the incarcerated Nisei.

Consequently, Omura was exiled after the war by the Japanese community, until the 1980s, for having authored anti-JACL articles during the war.

== Awards ==
In 1989, Omura was awarded the Lifetime Achievement Award from the Asian American Journalists Association. In 1994, Omura received the Fighting Spirit Award from the Nikkei for Civil Rights and Redress (NCRR) (formerly, National Coalition for Redress/Reparations).
