= Motohiko Eguchi =

American judoka

- Born: (Japan)
- Style: Judo

Motohiko Eguchi
Medal record

Men's Judo

Representing United States

1966 National Championships
| Gold medal – first place | US National Championships | 1966 |

Motohiko Eguchi is a Judo athlete. He served as a captain of the Nihon University Judo Team in 1966. Eguchi received a degree in economics at Nihon University, then moved to the US with Jerome Mackey. He had earned his 4th dan by age 23. He was the 1966 under-93 kg national Judo champion and was the grand champion in the 1966 US national Judo championships. He had served as the national guard champion in 1966, as well as the head coach of the Women's National Team in the 1985 Fukuoka Cup in Fukuoka, Japan. In 2013, he held an 8th dan in Judo.
