= Roy Kusumoto =

American businessman

Roy Kusumoto is an American businessman who founded Solectron in 1977. He started the company as a small assembly shop that under the input of Winston Chen and Ko Nishimura would grow into an electronics manufacturing giant with over $20 billion in sales and 65,000 employees.

Kusomoto had worked at Atari and founded another company Optical Diodes before starting Solectron. Originally intended as a solar energy company, Solectron first took up work as a peak period manufacturing service provider to Silicon Valley companies as a way of raising funds for the original solar purpose, but this pursuit in this sector never materialized.
