= 4th Independent Spirit Awards =

US film awards ceremony in 1989

- Date: March 25, 1989
- Site: Hollywood Roosevelt Hotel; Los Angeles, California; U.S.
- Hosted by: Buck Henry

Highlights
- Best Film: Stand and Deliver
- Most awards: Stand and Deliver (6)
- Most nominations: Stand and Deliver (7)

The 4th Independent Spirit Awards, honoring the best in independent filmmaking for 1988, were announced on March 25, 1989 at the Hollywood Roosevelt Hotel in Los Angeles. It was hosted by Buck Henry.

== Winners and nominees ==
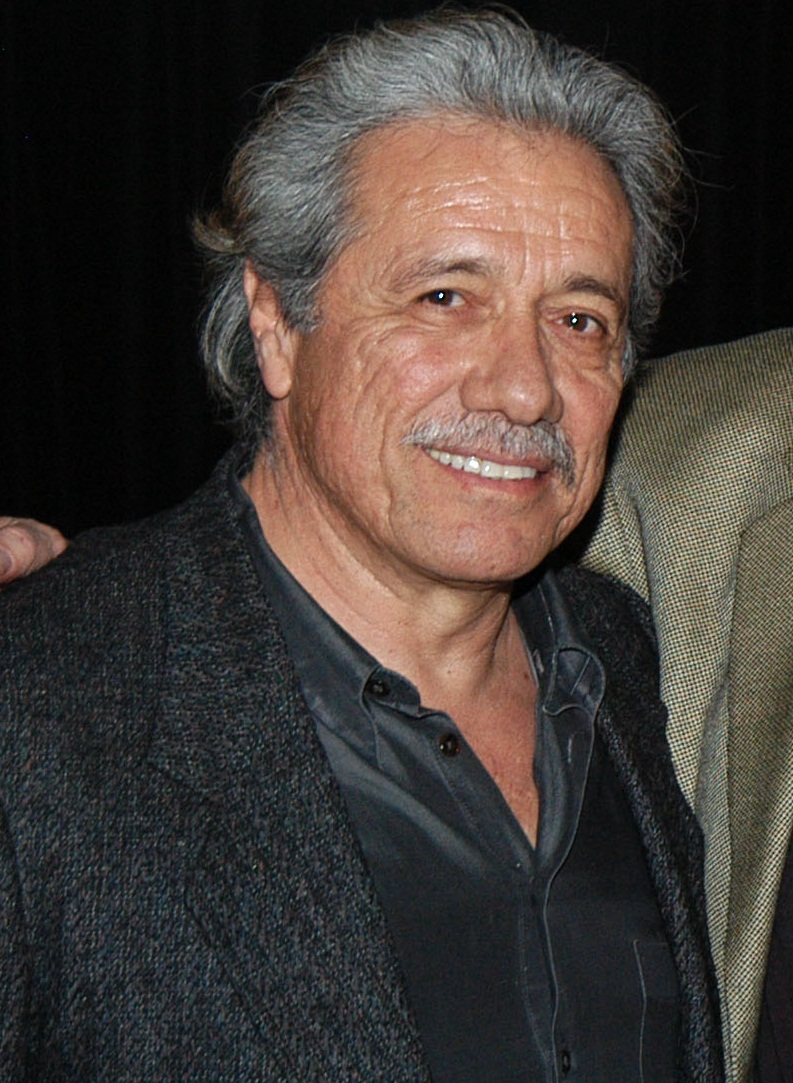
Edward James Olmos, Best Male Lead winner

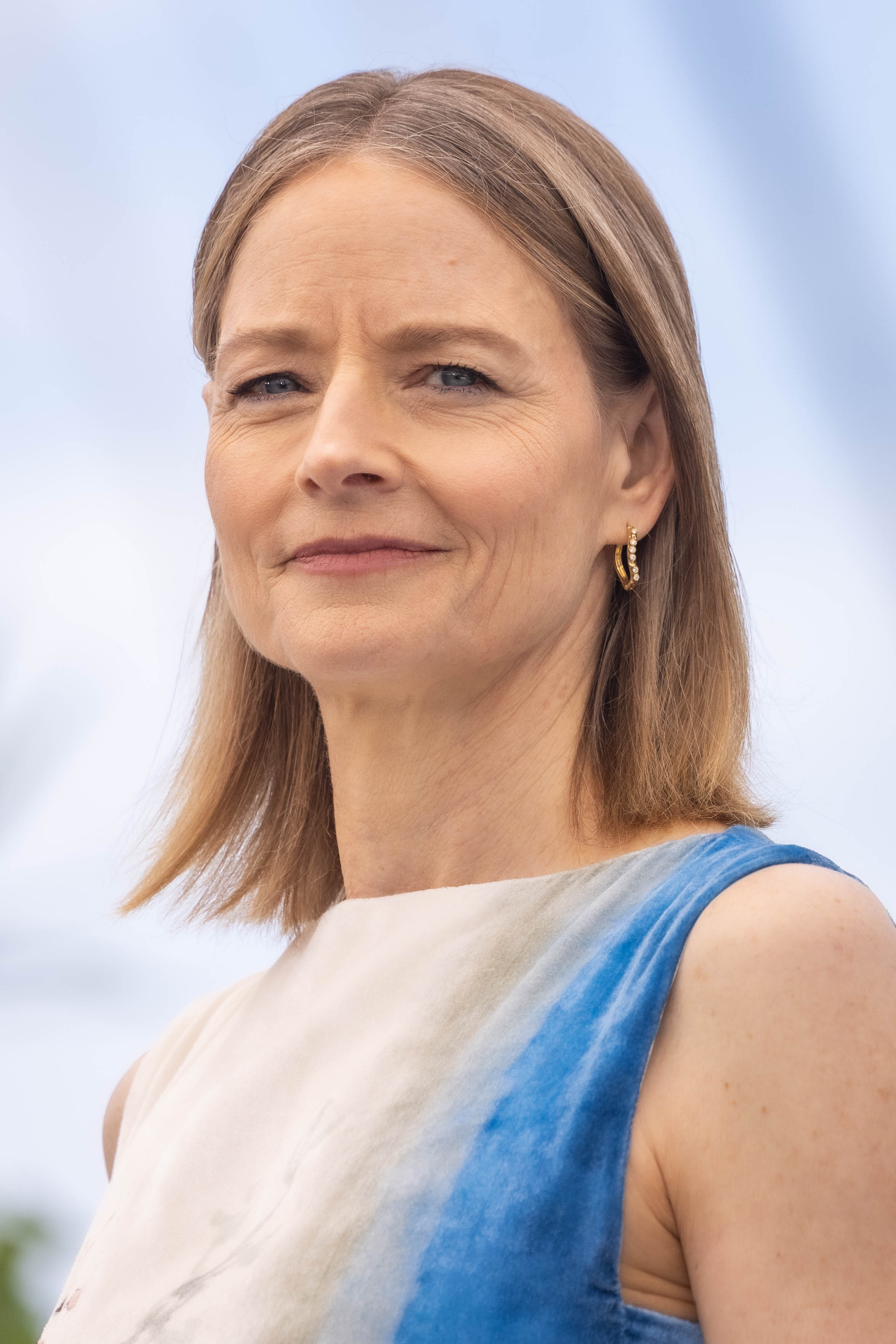
Jodie Foster, Best Female Lead winner

Best Feature	Best Director
Stand and Deliver: Hairspray; Patti Rocks; The Thin Blue Line; Torch Song Trilogy	Ramón Menéndez – Stand and Deliver: David Burton Morris – Patti Rocks; Errol Morris – The Thin Blue Line; Oliver Stone – Talk Radio; John Waters – Hairspray
Best Male Lead	Best Female Lead
Edward James Olmos – Stand and Deliver: Eric Bogosian – Talk Radio; Harvey Fierstein – Torch Song Trilogy; Chris Mulkey – Patti Rocks; James Woods – The Boost	Jodie Foster – Five Corners: Ricki Lake – Hairspray; Nobu McCarthy – The Wash; Julia Roberts – Mystic Pizza; Meg Ryan – Promised Land
Best Supporting Male	Best Supporting Female
Lou Diamond Phillips – Stand and Deliver: Ernest Borgnine – Spike of Bensonhurst; Divine – Hairspray; John Lone – The Moderns; John Turturro – Five Corners	Rosana De Soto – Stand and Deliver: Bonnie Bedelia – The Prince of Pennsylvania; Debbie Harry – Hairspray; Amy Madigan – The Prince of Pennsylvania; Patti Yasutake – The Wash
Best Screenplay	Best First Feature
Stand and Deliver – Ramón Menéndez and Tom Musca: Five Corners – John Patrick Shanley; Hairspray – John Waters; The Moderns – Alan Rudolph and Jon Bradshaw; Patti Rocks – John Jenkins, Karen Landry, David Burton Morris and Chris Mulkey	Mystic Pizza: Border Radio – Allison Anders; The Chocolate War; The Prince of Pennsylvania; The Wash
Best Cinematography	Best Foreign Film
The Unbearable Lightness of Being – Sven Nykvist: The Moderns – Toyomichi Kurita; Patti Rocks – Gregory Cummins; Stand and Deliver – Tom Richmond; Talk Radio – Robert Richardson	Wings of Desire • West Germany: Bagdad Cafe • West Germany; The Kitchen Toto • UK; A World Apart • UK; Yeelen • Mali

=== Films with multiple nominations and awards ===
==== Films that received multiple nominations ====
Nominations	Film
7	Stand and Deliver
6	Hairspray
5	Patti Rocks
3	Five Corners
3	The Moderns
3	The Prince of Pennsylvania
3	Talk Radio
3	The Wash
2	Mystic Pizza
2	The Thin Blue Line
2	Torch Song Trilogy

==== Films that won multiple awards ====
Awards	Film
6	Stand and Deliver

== Special awards ==
=== Friends of Independence Award ===
- The National Coalition of Independent Public Broadcasting Producers
