= Loose Ends (1975 film) =

1975 American feature film

Loose Ends is a 1975 American feature film by Victoria Wozniak and David Burton Morris.

== Summary ==
Two frustrated working class mechanics, one divorced (Chris Mulkey) while the other (John Jenkins) having a small struggling family, try to go to Denver, Colorado, in order to escape from their depressing lives.

== Production ==
The film was shot in Minneapolis, Minnesota, on a low budget while Morris was on summer break from UCLA. A Blu-ray release of the newly restored film was planned by Vinegar Syndrome after finding the original negative in a New Jersey warehouse, but was postponed afterwards.

== Reception and legacy ==
Variety stated that the film "fails to develop much identification with or empathy for the trapped participants" while Vincent Canby of The New York Times praised it as a "remarkably good, level-headed movie".

The 1988 film Patti Rocks serves as a sequel to this film.
