= Victor Slezak =

American actor

- Born: Victor Michael Szelazek; July 30, 1957 (age 69); Youngstown, Ohio, U.S.
- Occupation: Actor
- Years active: 1984–present
- Spouse: Leslie Smith Rawlings (m. 1999)
- Children: 1

Victor Slezak (born July 30, 1957) is an American stage, television and screen actor who has appeared in numerous films, including The Bridges of Madison County (1995), Beyond Rangoon (1995), The Devil's Own (1997), The Siege (1998), The Cat's Meow (2001), Timequest as John F. Kennedy (2002), and The Notorious Bettie Page (2005).

On Broadway, he starred as John F. Kennedy, opposite Margaret Colin, in Jackie: An American Life. He appeared Off-Broadway in 2007, playing the father of the character played by actress Olivia Wilde in Beauty on the Vine at the Harold Clurman Theatre.

== Personal life ==
Victor Michael Slezak was born in Youngstown, Ohio. He is married to Leslie Rawlings; they have one child. Slezak is not related to Walter Slezak or Erika Slezak. His surname is of Czech or Polish origin (cz. Slezák, pl. Ślęzak, meaning Silesian).

== Filmography ==
Year	Title	Role	Notes	Refs
1987	Five Corners	Policeman		
1991	Poison	Ray		
1991	Darrow	John Fredricks		
1991	Bed & Breakfast	Alex Caxton		
1991	Strictly Business	Maitre D'		
1992	Teamster Boss: The Jackie Presser Story	Sanger		
1995	Just Cause	Sergeant Rogers		
1995	Beyond Rangoon	Mr. Scott		
1995	The Bridges of Madison County	Michael		
1997	The Devil's Own	FBI Agent Evan Stanley		
1998	Fool's Gold	Joe		
1998	One Tough Cop	FBI Agent Burt Payne		
1998	The Siege	Colonel Hardwick		
2000	The Atrocity Exhibition	Travis Talbert		
2000	Lost Souls	Father Thomas		
2001	The Cat's Meow	George Thomas		
2001	Atlantis: The Lost Empire	Smithsonian Board Employer #30 (voice)		
2001	The Ponder Heart	Ovid Springer		
2002	Path to War	Norman Morrison		
2002	Timequest	John F. Kennedy		
2005	The Notorious Bettie Page	Minister in Miami		
2008	The Sisterhood of the Traveling Pants 2	Doctor		
2009	Bride Wars	Colson		
2009	The International	Captain Martell		
2009	Happy Tears	Eli Bell		
2009	Veronika Decides to Die	Gabriel Durant		
2010	Salt	One-Star General		
2011	Abduction	Tom Shealy		
2012	The Reluctant Fundamentalist	Maxwell Underwood		
2014	That Awkward Moment	Older Gentleman		
2015	A Rising Tide	Alek Rama		
2018	The Land of Steady Habits	Wes Thompson		
2019	The Report	Senator Jay Rockefeller		
2020	Worth	John Ashcroft		
2020	The Glorias	Walter		
2022	Out of the Blue	Richard		
2022	The Independent	President Archer		
2024	Babygirl	Mr. Missel		
2024	The Order	Richard Butler		
2026	Take Me Home	Bob		

== Television credits ==
Year	Title	Role	Notes	Refs
1984–1985	Guiding Light	Andy Ferris	Unknown episodes	
1988	Crime Story	Senator Deming	1 episode	
1989	Miami Vice	Jerome Horowitz	1 episode	
1989	A Man Called Hawk	McSwain	1 episode	
1992–2000	Law & Order	William Cousins / Steven Green / Jeffery Arbaugh / Philip Andrews	4 episodes	
1993	The Young Indiana Jones Chronicles	O'Bannion	1 episode	
1995	New York Undercover	Dennis	1 episode	
1998–1999	Hyperion Bay	Bordon Hicks	6 episodes	
2002	Witchblade	The Spirit	1 episode	
2003	Law & Order: Criminal Intent	Rev. Hale	1 episode	
2005	Jonny Zero	Styles	1 episode	
2006	Law & Order: Special Victims Unit	Blake Peters	1 episode	
2009	Taking Chance	Gunnery Sgt Mulcahy	TV movie	
2011–2012	Treme	Enrico Brulard	5 episodes	
2011	Mildred Pierce	Dr. Collins	2 episodes	
2011	Too Big to Fail	Greg Curl	TV movie	
2012	Homeland	Warden Jack Pritchard	"The Clearing"	
2012–2018	Blue Bloods	Chief of Intel Bryce Helfond	8 episodes	
2013	Muhammad Ali's Greatest Fight	Marshal of the Court	TV movie	
2013–2016	Hell on Wheels	Ulysses S. Grant	6 episodes	
2013–2018	The Americans	Lyle Rennhull	3 episodes	
2014	Madam Secretary	Prime Minister Vlad Diacov	1 episode	
2016	The OA	Kevin Harris	2 episodes	
2018	Jack Ryan	Joe Mueller	"Pilot"	
2019	Succession	Senator Roberts	2 episodes	
2020	Hunters	David Weil	1 episode	
