= Cultural depictions of Jacqueline Kennedy Onassis =

A major American icon, Jacqueline Kennedy Onassis has been portrayed, alluded to, and referred to in many media in the popular culture from the 1960s and continuing into the 21st century.

== Art ==
- Andy Warhol's 16 Jackies (1964) uses four news images of Kennedy prior to, the day of, and shortly after her husband's assassination. Warhol made several copies of this piece, using a combination of silkscreen and painting; one is in the collection of the Walker Art Center in Minneapolis, Minnesota.
- Gerhard Richter's 1964 painting Frau mit Schirm (Woman with Umbrella) is an emotional but respectful portrait of Kennedy, painted from a newspaper image.
- Tina Mion's 1997 oil painting Jacqueline Kennedy, the King of Hearts - Stop Action Reaction depicts Kennedy holding a playing card (the King of Hearts) that is being cut in two by a bullet. It is in the permanent collection of the National Portrait Gallery of the Smithsonian Institution.

== Film references ==
=== Portrayals ===
- In the 1968 short film Eat Your Makeup directed by John Waters, Divine plays Jackie Kennedy in a re-enactment of the JFK assassination. Waters later said on The Graham Norton Show that the scenes were filmed on his parents' home street to the neighbors' disgust, as it was not long after the real assassination had occurred.
- In The End of a Dynasty (1988), a docudrama about the "Kennedy curse", Cortnie Campbell plays Kennedy.
- In the 1991 film JFK, actress Jodie Farber plays Kennedy.
- The 1992 film Love Field, set during (and after) the President Kennedy's assassination, a Dallas housewife's life centers around Kennedy's actions, and she finds herself ruined by the President's assassination in Dallas. The role of Kennedy is played by actress Rhoda Griffis, in what is regarded as her breakout role.
- In the 1992 film Ruby, Mary Chris Wall plays Kennedy.
- In the 2000 film Thirteen Days, Stephanie Romanov plays Kennedy.
- The 2000 science fiction film Timequest explores what happens to Kennedy after the assassination is prevented by a time traveler, taking on an alternate timeline. Jacqueline Kennedy, played by (Caprice Benedetti), is one of the main leading roles in this film.
- In The Hoax (2006), Elizabeth Marley plays Kennedy.
- In the 2006 short film A Peace of Jackie, Susan Waldrop plays Kennedy.
- Minka Kelly portrays her in the 2013 film The Butler.
- Kat Steffens portrays her in the 2013 film Parkland.
- The 2016 film Jackie centers around the first lady (played by Natalie Portman, who was nominated for an Academy Award for Best Actress for her performance) as she reacts to her husband's death in the days following the assassination.
- Kim Allen portrays her in the 2017 film LBJ.

=== Other references in film ===
- The 1978 film The Greek Tycoon is a fictionalized portrayal of the story of Kennedy and her second husband, with the names changed. The Jackie Kennedy character, named Liz Cassidy, is portrayed by Jacqueline Bisset, who also portrayed Kennedy in America's Prince. Bisset's clothes were designed by Halston, who was also designing for Kennedy at the time.
- In the 1989 James Bond film Licence to Kill, when Bond (Timothy Dalton) introduced Pam Bouvier (Carey Lowell) to Q (Desmond Llewelyn), he referred her as "Miss Kennedy". Bouvier was Jacqueline Kennedy's maiden name.
- In the 1997 film Spice World, bandmember Posh Spice of the Spice Girls, appears in the photoshoot scene as Jackie Kennedy wearing a brown matching Pill box hat and Chanel suit with Jackie's trademark sunglasses and a handbag.
- In the 1997 film The House of Yes, actress Parker Posey played a main character who referred to herself as "Jackie O.", due to her obsession with the First Lady.
- In the 2001 film Riding in Cars with Boys, Brittany Murphy's character tells Sara Gilbert's character she looks like Onassis.
- In the 2001 film Legally Blonde, the main character is left by her boyfriend with the following explanation: "If I'm going to be a Senator by the time I'm thirty, well, I need to marry a Jackie, not a Marilyn."
- In the 2003 film Legally Blonde 2: Red, White & Blonde, actress Reese Witherspoon chooses to wear a Jackie Kennedy Onassis-inspired dress on her first day working in the U.S. Capitol.
- In the 2007 film Hairspray, Tracy made a reference to Kennedy's hairstyle when Edna Turnblad says her hair is "naturally stiff". Tracy also mentioned her as the first lady because the movie took place at the time of her husband's presidency.
- In the 2015 animated film Minions, supporting character Scarlet Overkill's style is very similar to and based on Jackie Kennedy's as she wears similar glasses, the same gloves and has a similar hairstyle that strongly resemble hers.

=== TV films ===
- Cristine Rose in The Trial of Lee Harvey Oswald (1977), 2-part TV film)
- Jaclyn Smith in Jacqueline Bouvier Kennedy (1981 TV movie)
- Jennifer Dale in Hoover vs. the Kennedys: The Second Civil War (1987 TV movie)
- Robin Curtis in LBJ: The Early Years (1987 TV movie)
- Rhea Perlman in How to Marry a Billionaire: A Christmas Tale (2000 TV movie)
- Jill Hennessy in Jackie, Ethel, Joan: The Women of Camelot (2001 TV movie)
- Katie Griffin in Power and Beauty (2002 TV movie)
- Jacqueline Bisset in America's Prince: The John F. Kennedy Jr. Story (2003 TV movie)
- Jesalyn White in LBJ vs. the Kennedys: Chasing Demons (2003 TV movie)
- Anna Valle in Callas e Onassis (2005 TV movie)
- Jeanne Tripplehorn in Grey Gardens (2009 TV film)
- Ginnifer Goodwin in Killing Kennedy (2013 TV film)

=== TV miniseries ===
- In Kennedy (1983 TV miniseries), Blair Brown plays Kennedy
- In Robert Kennedy and His Times (1985 TV miniseries), Juanin Clay plays Kennedy
- In Onassis: The Richest Man in the World (1988), a 4-hour TV movie adaptation, Francesca Annis plays Kennedy
- In A Woman Named Jackie (1991 TV mini-series), Marianna Bishop plays a young Jackie, Sarah Michelle Gellar plays a teenage Jackie, and Roma Downey plays an adult Jackie
- In Jackie Bouvier Kennedy Onassis (2000 TV miniseries), a 4-hour adaptation of the book by Donald Spoto, Sally Taylor-Isherwood plays Jackie Bouvier at 8, Emily VanCamp plays Jackie Bouvier at 13, and Joanne Whalley plays Jackie Bouvier Kennedy Onassis as an adult
- In The Kennedys (2011 TV mini-series), Katie Holmes played Kennedy. She reprised her role again in a 2017 sequel, The Kennedys: After Camelot.

=== TV series ===
- In season two episode "Dear Mrs. Kennedy" of The Crown (2016 Netflix original TV series), South African film and television actress Jodi Balfour plays Kennedy. The season is set in the early 1960s, during Queen Elizabeth II's early reign.
- For the season 43 of sketch comedy series Saturday Night Live, Natalie Portman reprised the role of Kennedy who comes as a ghost to give advice to First Lady Melania Trump (portrayed by Cecily Strong). In the sketch, Melania refers to Kennedy as "Jackie O's".
- For FX's TV series Feud: Capote vs. The Swans in the episode "Phantasm Forgiveness" she was played by Dara Adler.
- For FX's TV series Love Story she was played by Naomi Watts.

== Literature ==
(Alphabetical by author)

- Ira Levin's Rosemary's Baby (1967) features a dream sequence in which Rosemary Woodhouse finds herself on a yacht with the First Family and briefly speaks to Kennedy. This scene is depicted in the 1968 film version, but the identity of the Kennedys is not made clear.
- In Kurt Vonnegut's Galápagos (1985), Onassis is one of several celebrity guests who abandon the cruise before it leaves port.

Steven Rowley's The Editor is a novel about a writer for whom Jackie Onassis is the receptive and kind editor of his first novel.

The following are books in which Onassis is referenced biographically:

- Andersen, Christopher (1998). Jackie After Jack. William Morrow and Company, Inc. ISBN 978-0-688-15312-0.
- Anthony, Carl Sferrazza Anthony (1997). As We Remember Her: Jacqueline Kennedy Onassis in the Words of Her Family and Friends. Perigee Trade.
- Bowles, Hamish; Schlesinger, Arthur M. Jr.; Mellon, Rachel Lambert (2001). Jacqueline Kennedy: The White House Years. Bulfinch Press/Little, Brown and Company.
- Branch, Shelly Branch; Callaway, Sue (2006). What Would Jackie Do? An Inspired Guide to Distinctive Living. Gotham Books.
- Branford, Sarah (2000). America's Queen The Life of Jacqueline Kennedy Onassis (Illustrated ed.). New York: Viking.
- Davis, John H. Davis (1996). Jacqueline Bouvier: An Intimate Memoir. John Wiley and Sons, Inc. ISBN 978-0-471-12945-5.
- Flaherty, Tina Santi (2005). What Jackie Taught Us: Lessons from the Remarkable Life of Jacqueline Kennedy Onassis.
- Heymann, C. David (1989). A Woman Named Jackie: An Intimate Biography of Jacqueline Bouvier Kennedy Onassis. A Lyle Stuart Book first published by Carol Communications.
- Kelley, Kitty (1978). Jackie Oh!. Lyle Stuart.
- Klein, Edward (1996). The Kennedy Curse: Why Tragedy Has Haunted America's First Family for 150 Years. Pocket Books.
- Klein, Edward (1997). All Too Human: The Love Story of Jack and Jackie Kennedy. St. Martin's Press.
- Klein, Edward (1999). Just Jackie: Her Private Years. Ballantine Books. ISBN 978-0-345-42102-9.
- Klein, Edward (2004). Farewell, Jackie: A Portrait of Her Final Days. Viking Books. ISBN 978-0-670-03331-7.
- Manchester, William (1967). The Death of a President. New York: Harper & Row Publishers.
- Mulvaney, Jay (2001). Jackie, the Clothes of Camelot. St. Martin's Press. ISBN 978-0-312-28197-7.
- Mulvaney, Jay (2002). Diana & Jackie, Maidens, Mothers, Myths. St. Martin's Press. ISBN 978-0-312-28204-2.
- West, Naomi; Wilson, Catherine (2006). Jackie. Editions de la Martiniere.

== Music ==
=== Artists ===
- Jackie Onassis - the name of an Australian hip hop duo.
- Jacki-O - American rapper

=== Songs ===
- "52 Girls" by the B-52's - Kennedy is one of the eponymous 52 girls
- "Anything" by Third Eye Blind - Kennedy is referenced in the lyrics
- "Bobby and Jackie and Jack" from the Stephen Sondheim musical Merrily We Roll Along references the Kennedy family
- "Bullet" by the Misfits - Kennedy is referenced in the lyrics
- "Burn Like Brilliant Trash (at Jackie's funeral)" by Machines of Loving Grace - Kennedy is referenced in the lyrics
- "Captured by the Moment" by Steve Perry - Kennedy mentioned in the lyrics
- "Cruel" by Bryan Ferry - Kennedy is referenced in the lyrics
- "Don't Let Me Explode" by the Hold Steady - Kennedy is referenced in the lyrics
- "Fever for the Flava" by Hot Action Cop - Kennedy is referenced in the lyrics
- "Jackie" - recorded by Elisa Fiorillo and later covered by Lisa Stansfield's band, Blue Zone for their 1988 album, Big Thing
- "Jakie Kennedy" by Ola Svensson
- "Jacqueline/Jackie O" by Strung Out - about Kennedy after her husband's assassination
- "Jackie O'" by D-A-D
- "Jackie O" by John Mellencamp
- "Jackie Onassis" by Human Sexual Response
- "Jackie Onassis" by Sammy Rae - Kennedy is referenced in the lyrics
- "Jackie's Strength" by Tori Amos - inspired by Kennedy
- "Jackie Will Save Me" by American rock band Shiny Toy Guns
- "Jump Down, Spin Around (Pick A Dress O' Cotton)" lyrics by Allan Sherman - one of the earliest songs that mention her: "See how this one looks on me, Just like Jackie Kennedy."
- "La, La, La" (Excuse me Miss Again)" by Jay-Z - Kennedy is referenced in the lyrics
- "The Lady is a Vamp" by the Spice Girls - Kennedy is referenced in the lyrics
- "Linda Lovelace" by David Allan Coe - Kennedy is referenced in the lyrics
- "Mrs. O" by the Dresden Dolls - Kennedy is referenced in the lyrics
- "Nightmare On Elm Street" by A Balladeer - about her husband's assassination
- "One's on the Way" by Loretta Lynn - Kennedy is referenced in the lyrics
- "Posthuman" by Marilyn Manson - Kennedy is referenced in the lyrics
- "The Revolution Will Not Be Televised" by Gil Scott-Heron - Kennedy is referenced in the lyrics
- "Romeo and Juliet" by Mickey Avalon - Kennedy is referenced in the lyrics
- "Saturn 5" by Inspiral Carpets - she and JFK are referenced implicitly or literally
- "She Walked Beside the Wagon" by Lorrie Morgan - describes Kennedy at the President's funeral
- "Tire Me" by Rage Against the Machine - Kennedy is referenced in the lyrics
- "Touched by the Sun" by Carly Simon - written for Kennedy, a personal friend of Simon's
- "Tomorrow Wendy" by Concrete Blonde - Kennedy is referenced in the lyrics
- "The Trouble With Lovers" by Vegas
- "You Wear It Well" by Rod Stewart - "Madam Onassis" is referenced in the lyrics of the 1972 hit single
- "National Anthem" by Lana Del Rey - Del Rey emulates Kennedy while reenacting the JFK assassination and the couple's life together alongside rapper ASAP Rocky in the song's music video
- "Puppy Love" by Lana Del Rey
- "Marilyn" by G-Eazy

== Plays and theatrical works ==
- Cirque Jacqueline, by Andrea Reese — Triad Theater, NY, NY
- Die Prinzessindramen: Der Tod und das Maedchen IV - Jackie, by Elfriede Jelinek
- The First Lady, by Herman van Veen and Lori Spee
- Grey Gardens - Walter Kerr Theatre, New York City, NY; the character of Jacqueline Bouvier appears in Act I, portrayed by Sarah Hyland
- Jackie, by Naomi West & Catherine Wilson Editions de la Martiniere
- Jackie, An American Life, by Gip Hoppe — Wilbur Theatre, Boston, MA; Margaret Colin portrayed Kennedy.
- Jackie O, an opera by Michael Daugherty — Houston Opera Studio, Houston, TX
- Jackie Undressed, by Andree Stolte — Eagles Dare Theater, NY, NY
- JACKS, by Lys Anzia — Fremont Centre Theatre, South Pasadena, CA* Cirque Jacqueline by Andrea Reese — Triad Theater, NY, NY.
- The Secret Letters of Jackie & Marilyn, by Mark Hampton and Michael Sharp - O'Reilly Theatre, Pittsburgh, PA
- The Tragedy of JFK (as told by Wm. Shakespeare), produced by the Blank Theatre in Los Angeles — Casey McKinnon's award-winning performance as Jacqueline Bouvier Kennedy is based on Calpurnia in Shakespeare's Julius Caesar who warns her husband not to go forth today.

== Television and anime references ==
(Alphabetical by series)

- In Breaking Bad: "Madrigal", Mike likens Lydia to "Jackie Onassis" because of her insistence on wearing sunglasses during a clandestine meeting.
- In The Crown, South African actress Jodi Balfour plays Kennedy in a Season 2 episode set during the Kennedys' visit of Buckingham Palace in 1961.
- Elizabeth Lambert plays Kennedy in Dark Skies: "Moving Targets"
- Laura Yonker plays Kennedy in Days That Shook the World: "JFK"
- In one episode of The Drew Carey Show, Mimi Bobeck shows up to work wearing oversized glasses and a scarf over her hair due to an allergic reaction to her makeup. This prompts Drew to remark, "It's Jackie! Oh my God!"
- In Family Guy: "E. Peterbus Unum", Lois is dressed in the a pink Chanel suit while giving tours of Petoria. There is also a reference to Jackie Onassis in "The Road to the Multiverse", in which she is portrayed as the wife of the "Mayor Mccheese" on a scene similar to Zapruder film.
- Jackie O's famous pillbox hat is featured in The Flintstones: "Social Climbers" (original airdate November 17, 1961). In it, Wilma and Betty are visiting one of Bedrock's houses of Haute Couture to look for a dress for the Ambassador's Reception and Betty comments on the new "Jackie Kennerock" look.
- One sketch on French and Saunders depicts Onassis as a vacuous, shifty woman.
- In Futurama: "A Taste of Freedom", Amy wears a purple suit, matching pillbox hat, and white gloves during Zoidberg's trial is similar to Onassis' pink suit.
- In Series 6, Episode 21 of Gilmore Girls, Lorelai walks into her parents' living room to find Emily lying on the couch and says, "Oh, I'm sorry Mrs. Onassis, I was looking for my mother".
- In the season two episode Gossip Girl: "Seder Anything", Blair Waldorf mentions that "if being a socialite is good enough for Jackie O, it's good enough for me."
- In one episode of King of the Hill, several 1970's icons are on a murder mystery train. As Jacqueline enters, a character says: "Oh look, Jackie O." Jackie is wearing large sunglasses and a scarf.
- Onassis appears as a character in an episode of the Japanese anime Lupin the 3rd.
- In Married... with Children: "Dud Bowl" (season nine), Polk High School's rival, George S. Patton High, is renamed Jackie Onassis High. The school's mascot is the First Ladies, and the uniforms are pink and black. This is a reference to a famous Chanel suit Onassis wore on the day her first husband was assassinated.
- The school attended by the characters of Popular is named Jacqueline Kennedy Onassis High School.
- The season five premiere of Quantum Leap involves a storyline where Sam "leaps" into Lee Harvey Oswald and fails to save President Kennedy from his assassination. Then, "leaping" into Secret Service agent Clint Hill, Sam discovers from Al that he wasn't there to save the President, he was there to save Onassis (implying that in an earlier timeline she died as well).
- In one episode of Queer as Folk, Emmett dresses up as Onassis for a party thrown by Michael and David. In an apparent reference to her husband's assassination, shrimp cocktail is spilled on his coat, causing it to resemble Onassis' blood-spattered suit after JFK's assassination.
- On Rowan & Martin's Laugh-In (second season), Jackie Onasis is impersonated in a "Cocktail Party" segment lampooning her newly acquired image as a materialistic spendthrift: "Ari and I had a garage sale. We made a lot of money. So far, we've sold three garages."
- In Scream Queens, Chanel Oberlin dresses in a Jackie Kennedy inspired outfit for Halloween in the first season's fifth episode, which is also later worn by Libby Putney / Chanel #5 in the same episode.
- In Seinfeld: "The Chaperone", Elaine Benes (Julia Louis-Dreyfus) interviews for Onassis' former job as editor at Doubleday and wears large sunglasses and a scarf over her hair in a style similar to that of Onassis.
- Jacqueline Kennedy Onassis is referenced in The Simpsons in several ways. Marge Simpson's mother is named Jacqueline Ingrid Bouvier^{α}, and Marge Simpson was made known of the origin of her maiden name by Lisa when she wanted to adopt the maiden name after exposing Homer's betting scandal on Homer and Lisa Exchange Cross Words. Marge mistakenly thought "Jackie-O", as in Onassis, was her maiden name. Mayor Quimby speaks with inflections similar to those of the former president, and his wife resembles Onassis. Marge is also seen buying and wearing the Pink Chanel suit to a country club in one episode.
- In The Sopranos: "Kennedy and Heidi" (season six, part two), Tony likens Kelli Lombardo Moltisanti to Jackie Kennedy, when he sees Kelli at Chris' funeral.
- That '70s Show: "Eric's Drunken Tattoo" references Onassis. Michael Kelso (Ashton Kutcher) mumbles the name "Jackie" in his sleep. It is implied that he was referring to Jackie Burkhart (Mila Kunis); however, it is revealed that he is referring to Onassis.
- In Thunderbirds Tin-Tin Kyrano is seen wearing Jackie Kennedy styled outfits and hairstyles in some of the episodes whilst the female driver in the episode City of Fire bears some resemblance to Jackie.
- In The Vampire Diaries: "The Last Dance" (season two), Caroline goes to the sixties decade dance as Jackie Kennedy and her boyfriend Matt goes as JFK.
- The Venture Bros. character Dr. Girlfriend resembles Onassis, but talks in a deep male voice meant to be an exaggeration of Onassis' voice, made husky due to her excessive smoking. In the fourth episode of the third season, "Home Is Where the Hate Is", Dr. Girlfriend is given the following clues during a party game: "You're married to a powerful man", "You're famous for your pink suit and pillbox hat". Dr. Girlfriend is confused and, upon discovering the name she was assigned, exclaims: "Who the hell is Jacqueline Onassis?"

== Internet memes ==
In 2022 on Twitter and TikTok, users began posting memes that satirizing Jackie Kennedy's physical appearance and depicting her as a feral creature who ate and enjoyed multiple obtuse objects such as sheet metal, spare change (pennies) and the White House's marble columns, among others. The memes are usually accompanied by audios of growling noises and captions in similar vein to "JACKIE WANT SHEET METAL!!!"

== Video games ==
- The popular music Video Game Rock Band 2 features a Sunglasses accessory called "Jackie O's" which are Jackie's famous trademark sunglasses.
- The 2024 video game Dustborn depicts an alternate history in which Jackie was accidentally assassinated instead of John F. Kennedy.

== Notes and references ==
^{α} The show's developers created this character and named her after Jacqueline Kennedy Onassis, whose maiden name was Bouvier. It is also noted that Marge Simpson has the maiden name "Bouvier", and all Bouvier women are voiced by Julie Kavner.

== See also ==
- Cultural depictions of John F. Kennedy
- Assassination of John F. Kennedy in popular culture
- Robert F. Kennedy in media
