= Timequest (film) =

- DVD cover
- Directed by: Robert Dyke
- Written by: Robert Dyke
- Produced by: Gary Bloom; Charles F. Cirgenski; Ron Cook; James A. Courtney; Mary Petryshyn; Tom Van Scyoc
- Starring: Victor Slezak; Caprice Benedetti; Ralph Waite; Vince Grant; Bruce Campbell; Barry Corbin
- Cinematography: Lon Stratton
- Edited by: Joseph Kleinman
- Music by: Dan Kolton
- Distributed by: Ardustry; Creative Light Worldwide
- Release date: April 13, 2000
- Running time: 95 minutes
- Language: English

Timequest is a 2000 science-fiction film directed by Robert Dyke and starring Victor Slezak as John F. Kennedy, Caprice Benedetti as Jacqueline Kennedy, and Ralph Waite as the Time Traveler. The film also features Vince Grant and Bruce Campbell. After premiering on April 13, 2000, the film had a limited theatrical release in the United States, followed shortly by distribution on VHS and DVD to the United States, Canada, and Australia. Timequest explores the science fiction theme of altering the present day by traveling back in time and tampering with past events – specifically, preventing the assassination of John F. Kennedy.

== Plot ==
On the morning of November 22, 1963, an elderly man who wears spacesuit-type clothing materializes in the hotel suite occupied by Jackie Kennedy. The Time Traveler shows Jackie future television footage of the assassination and funeral of John F. Kennedy. Shortly thereafter, the Time Traveler speaks to the president and to Attorney General Bobby Kennedy, giving them details of their respective assassinations and of the public revelations of JFK's sex scandals, convincing the president to remain faithful to Jackie. The Time Traveler won't state his name or his birthplace, but does mention that he was born on this day. The Time Traveler, who is clearly very fond of Jackie, is pleased when she agrees to dance with him.

The Time Traveler and the three Kennedys drink a toast in the hotel suite just before 12:30, which is the time that afternoon that JFK was historically assassinated in his motorcade. At 12:30 the Time Traveler turns into nothingness, and a lead-crystal glass that he was holding drops to the floor and shatters. Bobby finds a piece of glass with the Time Traveler's fingerprint on it.

Clint Hill and Bobby then travel ahead to Dallas, where Hill takes out two gunmen behind a fence on grassy knoll, confirming one of the later conspiracy theories about the assassination. Third gunman Lee Harvey Oswald is captured, and Jack Ruby is killed before he can shoot Oswald, who is taken to Washington, D.C. and interrogated by the Warren Commission, culminating in the CIA's disbandment. When FBI Director J. Edgar Hoover threatens to blackmail the President by revealing audio tapes of Kennedy having sex with Marilyn Monroe, Bobby counters by threatening to release photos of Hoover's homosexuality. Hoover agrees to hand over the tapes, and also agrees to hand in his letter of resignation.

John and Jackie appear on television. John reveals his infidelities and asks for forgiveness from both his wife and the nation. Jackie stands with her husband and asks the country to do the same.

Having been forewarned by the Time Traveler that the Vietnam War will end with 57,000 American soldiers having died for nothing, Kennedy announces, ahead of the 1964 presidential election, the withdrawal of US military forces from Vietnam. Vice President Lyndon Johnson is enraged by this and tries to dissuade him from this or least wait until after the 1964 election (which realistically Kennedy would've done the latter) but Kennedy refuses. Kennedy, in a speech televised from a rally at Rice Stadium, recommits to the importance of the Apollo Program, but also expands it to be a project for all humanity, and openly calls for the Soviet Union to participate in it, appealing to Nikita Khrushchev to negotiate an end to the Cold War. His efforts are ultimately successful, resulting in humanity's first Moon landing being a joint US-Soviet project, with astronaut John Glenn and (fictional) cosmonaut Nikilia Bresnev planting their two nations' flags together on the Moon.

In 1964, Bobby is still determined to uncover the Time Traveler's identity, wanting to prevent him from eventually inventing time travel, but a pregnant Jackie exacts an iron promise from Bobby that the Time Traveler would never be harmed. As it turns out, the Time Traveler is currently a toddler named Raymond Mead. Mead, like his older Time Traveler self, is obsessed with Jackie Kennedy. In 1979, a then sixteen-year-old Mead commits a burglary, is arrested and put on a prison bus; his fingerprinting enables now-President Bobby Kennedy to know the Time Traveler's name. President Bobby has the teenager pulled off the bus, he talks to the kid, and he gives Mead a full pardon.

As time passes, Mead becomes an artist and gets married. Jackie has bought many of his paintings, up until her 1994 death (the same year as in the original timeline). JFK dies in 2000, at age 83, of natural causes. With both his parents gone, the Kennedy's youngest son, James Robert, explains to Mead why the Kennedy family has been so generous to him and reveals a portrait of his older self. The film ends with Mead's younger self (rather than the older Time Traveler) dancing with Jackie in 1963 as a dream sequence, then shows the real Mead as a toddler in 1964 staring at televised footage of Jackie with her new baby, James, being discharged from Dallas' Parkland Memorial Hospital, where JFK had died in the original timeline.

== Characters ==
Actor	Role	Revised History	"Status" as of 2000
Victor Slezak	John F. Kennedy (JFK)	The 35th President of the United States.	Died in 2000. Age 83
Caprice Benedetti	Jacqueline Kennedy	The wife of John F. Kennedy.	Died in 1994. Age 64
Vince Grant	Robert F. Kennedy (RFK)	The Attorney General and 37th President of the United States.	Still alive.
Bruce Campbell	William Roberts	A very controversial film maker similar to Oliver Stone, who makes an erotic film about Bobby's Presidency and is a Conspiracy Theorist.	Still alive.
Barry Corbin	Lyndon Johnson	The Vice-president to President JFK.	Died in 1973.
Larry Drake	J. Edgar Hoover	The notorious Director of the FBI who tries to blackmail JFK.	Forcibly resigned from the FBI in 1963 and died in 1972.
Ralph Waite	The Time Traveler	Born November 22, 1963 as Raymond Mead.	Died November 22, 1963 after changing history and fading into nothing.
Joseph Murphy	Raymond Mead	Born November 22, 1963; became the Time Traveler.	Married and still alive.
Rick Gianasi	James Robert Kennedy	Born August 22, 1964; fourth child of John and Jackie Kennedy.	Married and still alive.
David Haig	Agent Clint Hill	Secret Service agent that kills the would-be JFK assassins and Jack Ruby	Still alive (retired)
Debra Port	Janice Kennedy	Wife of James Robert Kennedy.	Married and still alive.
Reuben Yabuku	Martin Luther King Jr.	Civil Rights Hero who becomes Vice-president to President Robert Kennedy.	Still alive.
Amanda Bernacchi	Cheryl Stein	Ray Mead's wife in 1994/2001.	Still alive.
Dawn Lafferty	Magic Bullit	The actress in William Roberts' 2001 erotic film RFK.	Still alive.
Shelly Marks	Norma Jeane	JFK's most infamous affair. Her voice is heard on the tape J Edgar Hoover tried to blackmail him with.	Died in 1962, by unknown cause.
Richard Jewell	Agent Richards	Clint Hill's fellow Secret Service Agent, arrests Oswald at the 6th Floor Book Depository.	Still alive (retired).
Jeffery Steiger	Lee Harvey Oswald	The would-be assassin of John F. Kennedy.	Still alive but in prison.
Marty Bufalini	Dan Rather	The news reporter who originally (on radio) announced JFK's death to the world in the old timeline. In the new one he announces the birth of James Robert Kennedy in 1964.	
Andrew Dunn	Abraham Zapruder	A dressmaker, waiting with his camera to film the President's motorcade in Dallas. His camera is stolen by Bobby and Clint when they realize he may have filmed them killing the assassins on the grassy knoll. His camera is recovered in 2001 by William Roberts from the National Archives and he uses it to try to show his conspiracy theory about Bobby's actions in Dallas in November 1963.	

== See also ==
- Cultural depictions of John F. Kennedy
- Cultural depictions of Jacqueline Kennedy Onassis
- Assassination of John F. Kennedy in popular culture
