= Ralph Waite =

American actor (1928–2014)

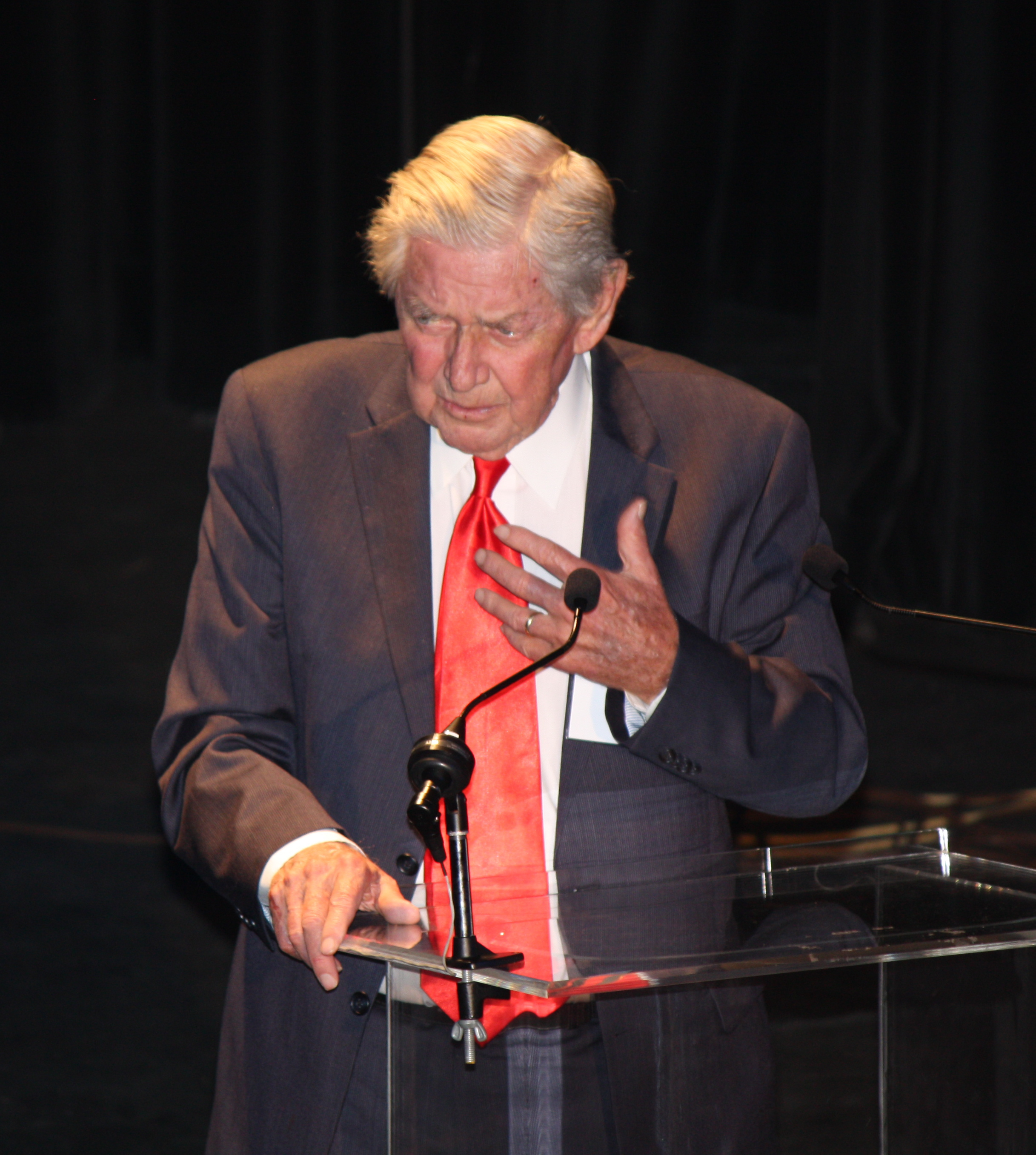
- Waite at the 40th anniversary of The Waltons on September 29, 2012
- Born: June 22, 1928; White Plains, New York, U.S.
- Died: February 13, 2014 (aged 85); Palm Desert, California, U.S.
- Resting place: White Plains Rural Cemetery
- Education: Bucknell University and Yale Divinity School
- Occupations: Actor, political activist
- Years active: 1954–2014
- Political party: Democratic
- Spouses: Beverly Waite (m. 1951; div. 1966) Kerry Shear Waite (m. 1977; div. 1981) Linda East (m. 1982)
- Children: 3

Ralph Waite (June 22, 1928 – February 13, 2014) was an American actor, best known for his lead role as John Walton Sr. on The Waltons (1972–1981), which he occasionally directed. He later had recurring roles in NCIS as Jackson Gibbs, the father of Leroy Jethro Gibbs, and in Bones, as Seeley Booth's grandfather.

Waite had supporting roles in movies such as Cool Hand Luke (1967), Five Easy Pieces (1970), The Grissom Gang (1971), The Bodyguard (1992), and Cliffhanger (1993).

== Early life ==
Waite, the eldest of five children, was born in White Plains, New York, on June 22, 1928, to Ralph H. Waite, a construction engineer, and Esther (née Mitchell) Waite. He graduated from White Plains Senior High School in 1946. Too young for World War II, Waite served in the U.S. Marine Corps from 1946 to 1948, then graduated from Bucknell University in Lewisburg, Pennsylvania. He worked briefly as a social worker. Waite earned a master's degree from Yale University's Divinity School and was an ordained Presbyterian minister and religious editor at Harper & Row, New York, before deciding on an acting career. He was a member of the Peninsula Players summer theater program during the 1963 season, and studied under Lee Strasberg at the Actors Studio.

== Career ==
Wait'es first professional role was the chief of police in The Balcony in a 1960 production of the play in New York. In 1963, he made his Broadway debut as the Minister in Marathon '33, written and directed by June Havoc. He next appeared in Blues for Mister Charlie, and worked on- and off-Broadway steadily throughout the 1960s. His first film role was in Cool Hand Luke in 1967, followed by multiple other film roles.

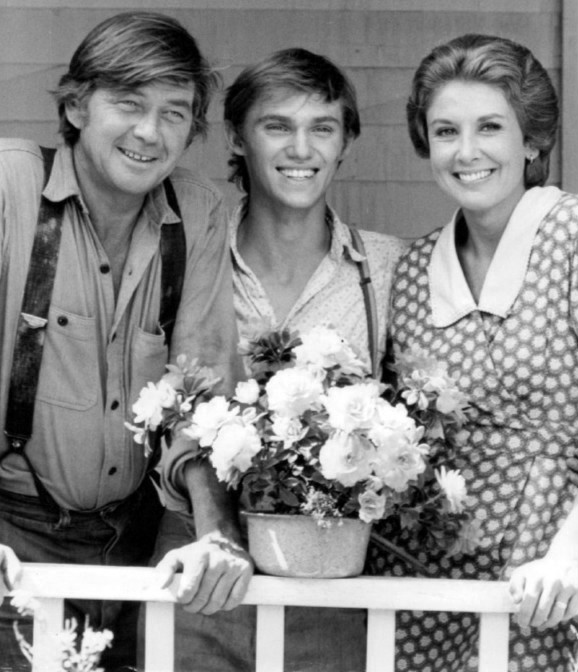
From The Waltons (1972), L-R: Ralph Waite, Richard Thomas, and Michael Learned

Beginning in 1972, Waite appeared in The Waltons for nine seasons and was nominated for an Emmy Award for his portrayal of John Walton Sr., the father of seven children, in the series that followed a Virginia family during the Great Depression. Waite was also the director for 16 episodes of the series.

Waite founded the experimental Los Angeles Actor's theatre in 1975 and served as its artistic director.

In 1977, he appeared in the mini-series Roots and was nominated for an Emmy Award. Other television roles included The Mississippi (1982-1984), Murder One (1996), Carnivàle (2003-2005), and Days of Our Lives (2009-2013).

Waite originated the role of Will Kidder in the Pulitzer Prize-winning The Young Man from Atlanta by playwright Horton Foote, in 1995.

His later films included The Bodyguard, the part of Frank the helicopter pilot in the 1993 film Cliffhanger, and as the mysterious time traveler in Timequest (2002). He also voiced Shadow in Homeward Bound II.

In the 2000s, Waite had recurring roles in NCIS as Jackson Gibbs, the father of Leroy Jethro Gibbs, and in Bones as Seeley Booth's grandfather.

== Personal life ==
Waite was married three times, two marriages ending in divorce. He had three daughters from his first marriage. His eldest daughter, Sharon Waite, died of leukemia when she was 9 years old in 1964. Liam Waite, one of Waite's stepsons, is also an actor. After 50 years away from organized religion, Waite returned in 2010 and became an active member of Spirit of the Desert Presbyterian Fellowship in Palm Desert, California.

=== Political involvement ===
Waite ran unsuccessfully for Congress in California as a Democrat on three occasions: In 1990, he challenged veteran GOP incumbent Al McCandless in the Riverside County-based 37th district, losing by 5%. In 1998, Waite ran in the special election for the then-Palm Springs-based 44th district left vacant by the death of incumbent Sonny Bono. He was defeated in that election by Mary Bono, Sonny's widow, and lost to her again that November.

On October 21, 1991, Waite introduced former California Governor Jerry Brown prior to the latter's speech announcing his candidacy for the 1992 Democratic presidential nomination.

==== Electoral history ====
Year	Office	Democrat	Votes	Pct	Republican	Votes	Pct
1990	U.S House of Representatives; District 37	Jeffrey Jacobs 29% Ralph Waite 71%	103,961	44.8%	Bud Mathewson 27% Al McCandless 73%	115,469	49.8%
1998	U.S House of Representatives; District 44 (special election)	Ralph Waite	24,228	28.8%	Mary Bono	53,755	64%
1998	U.S House of Representatives; District 39 (general election)	Ralph Waite	57,697	35.7%	Mary Bono	97,013	60.1%

== Death ==
On February 13, 2014, Waite died in Palm Desert, California, of natural causes at age 85. He is buried in White Plains Rural Cemetery in New York. The NCIS episode "Honor Thy Father", the season 11 finale, is dedicated to Waite's memory.

== Filmography ==
=== Film ===
Director

- On the Nickel (1980) (Also writer)

Actor

Year	Title	Role	Notes
1967	Cool Hand Luke	"Alibi"	
1968	A Lovely Way to Die	Sean Magruder	
1969	Last Summer	Peter's Father	Uncredited
1970	Five Easy Pieces	Carl Fidelio Dupea	
1971	The Pursuit of Happiness	Detective Cromie	
1971	The Sporting Club	Olson	
1971	Lawman	Jack Dekker	
1971	The Grissom Gang	Mace	
1972	Chato's Land	Elias Hooker	
1972	Hot Summer Week	John	
1972	The Magnificent Seven Ride!	Jim MacKay	
1973	Trouble Man	Pete Cockrell	
1973	Kid Blue	Drummer	
1973	The Stone Killer	Mathews	
1980	On the Nickel	C.G.	
1980	Angel City	Jared Teeter	
1988	Good Old Boy: A Delta Boyhood	The Narrator	
1989	Red Earth, White Earth	Martin	
1990	Crash and Burn	Lathan Hooks	
1990	Desperate Hours		
1992	The Bodyguard	Herb Farmer	
1993	Cliffhanger	Ranger Frank	
1994	Sioux City	Drew McDermott	
1996	Homeward Bound II: Lost in San Francisco	Shadow	Voice
2000	Timequest	The Time Traveler	
2002	Sunshine State	Furman Temple	
2004	Silver City	Casey Lyle	
2010	Letters to God	Cornelius Perryfield	
2011	25 Hill	Ed	
2012	Gabe the Cupid Dog	R.L. Dutton	

=== Television ===
Director

Year	Title	Notes
1973-1980	The Waltons	16 episodes
1983	The Mississippi	Episode "Mardi Gras"

Actor

Year	Title	Role	Notes
1966	Look Up and Live	Host	
1967–1968	N.Y.P.D.	Robert Stryker	
1970	Bonanza	Hoby	Episode "The Lady and the Mark"
1971	Nichols	Sam Burton	
1972–1981	The Waltons	John Walton Sr.	
1977	Roots	Slater, First Mate	
1978	CBS: On the Air	Himself	
1983	The Mississippi	Ben Walker	
1987	Reading Rainbow		
1989	Murder, She Wrote	District Attorney Paul Robbins	
1993	Roseanne	Dr. Gerald Baker	
1994	Time Trax	Lamont Carson	
1996	Murder One	Malcolm Dietrich	
1997	Orleans	Otis Leblanc	
1999	The Outer Limits	Gene Morton	
1999	Chicken Soup for the Soul	Dad	
1999	Rocket Power	Doc Freimouth	Voice
2001	All My Children	Bart	
2003–2005	Carnivàle	Reverend Norman Balthus	
2004	The Practice	Walter Josephson	
2007	Cold Case	Felton Metz	
2008	CSI	Sheriff Montgomery	Episode "Young Man with a Horn"
2008–2013	NCIS	Jackson Gibbs	8 episodes
2008	The Cleaner	Jonus Mullins	
2009–2014	Days of Our Lives	Father Matt	
2009	Grey's Anatomy	Irving Waller	Episode "Tainted Obligation"
2009–2013	Bones	Hank Booth	3 episodes
2011	Off the Map	Abuelito	Episode "On the Mean Streets of San Miguel"

TV movies

Year	Title	Role	Notes
1967	The Borgia Stick	The Man From Toledo	
1973	The Thanksgiving Story		
1976	The Secret Life of John Chapman	John Chapman	
1977	Red Alert	Henry Stone	
1977	Waiting for Godot	Pozzo	
1980	OHMS	Floyd Wing	
1980	Angel City	Jared Teeter	
1981	The Gentleman Bandit	Father Bernard Pagano	
1982-1999	A Wedding on Walton's Mountain	John Walton Sr.	Reunion movies
1982-1999	Mother's Day on Waltons Mountain	John Walton Sr.	Reunion movies
1982-1999	A Day for Thanks on Walton's Mountain	John Walton Sr.	Reunion movies
1982-1999	A Walton Thanksgiving Reunion	John Walton Sr.	Reunion movies
1982-1999	A Walton Wedding	John Walton Sr.	Reunion movies
1982-1999	A Walton Easter	John Walton Sr.	Reunion movies
1984	A Good Sport	Tommy O'Bannon	Also executive producer
1984	Growing Pains	Rob	
1985	Crime of Innocence	Frank Hayward	
1990	Sparks: The Price of Passion	Orville Lemon	
1994	Sin & Redemption	Cal Simms	
1994	Keys	Dr. C.J. Halligan	
1995	A Season of Hope	Sam Hackett	
1997	The Third Twin	Senator Proust	
2000	The President's Man	President Mathews	
2001	Spirit	Jacob	
2003	Blessings	Sheriff	
2007	Murder 101: If Wishes Were Horses	Jacob Brawley	
2009	Ace Ventura Jr.: Pet Detective	Grandpa Ventura	

== Theatre ==
- Marathon '33 (1963)
- Blues for Mister Charlie (1964)
- Hogan's Goat (play) (1965)
- The Trial of Lee Harvey Oswald (1967)
- Other People's Money (play, before the film) (1991, Trinity Repertory Company, Providence, RI)
- The Young Man from Atlanta (1995)
