= Sanitarium (film) =

- Directed by: Bryan Ortiz; Bryan Ramirez; Kerry Valderrama
- Written by: Evan Boston; Crystal Bratton; James Hartz; Scott Marcano; Bryan Ortiz; Kerry Valderrama
- Produced by: Amanda Rubio Ramirez; Kerry Valderrama
- Starring: Malcolm McDowell; Lou Diamond Phillips; John Glover; Robert Englund; Chris Mulkey; David Mazouz; Lacey Chabert
- Cinematography: Philip Roy
- Edited by: Paul de La Cerda; Justin Malone; Bryan Ortiz
- Music by: Douglas Edward
- Release date: March 1, 2013 (Miami International Film Festival)
- Running time: 108 minutes
- Country: United States
- Language: English

Sanitarium is a 2013 horror anthology film that was directed by Bryan Ortiz (Monsters are Real), Bryan Ramirez (Figuratively Speaking), and Kerry Valderrama (Up to the Last Man). It received its world premiere at the Miami International Film Festival on March 1, 2013, and was released to DVD on December 31, 2013.

The film stars John Glover, David Mazouz, and Lou Diamond Phillips as three people whose stories ultimately lead them - and friends - to become patients of a sanitarium.

== Plot ==
The film is divided into three short stories framed by Dr. Henry Stenson (played by Malcolm McDowell), a psychiatrist who is treating three patients with unique disorders. Each story is preceded and succeeded by Stenson giving a monologue about his interpretation, except for the last patient, whom he interviews directly. The second patient's story is additionally framed by a psychiatry student about to write a thesis by reading the patient's file.

=== Figuratively Speaking ===
Gustav (played by John Glover) is an aged, disheveled doll artist who works for his old friend, Sam (played by Robert England). Sam helps showcase his creations. He is assisted by the young Mateo, whom he is unaware has been drugging his alcohol with a psychoactive drug which soon drives Gustav into believing that his creations can talk. He is especially obsessed with a female doll whom he names Madeline, who talks him into killing Sam, his assistant, and also Mateo's lover, Isabelle. After Mateo discloses what he has done, Gustav commits suicide, but not before saying that Mateo can now own his creations. The segment is closed with the deranged Mateo opening a box containing Gustav's creations, as Stenson wonders which one is controlling which.

=== Monsters are Real ===
A young boy, Steven (played by David Mazouz), who has catatonic schizophrenia, lives with his abusive father (Chris Mulkey), who forces him to do household chores while he goes to a strip club every day. Steven feels stalked by an enormous man clad in black with a black fedora. One day, while having his attention on a friend's pornographic magazine, the man stops him from leaving, revealing his monstrous face, but he suddenly disappears when Steven's teacher, the kind Ms. Lorne (Lacey Chabert), arrives and holds Steven responsible for the magazine. Suspecting that his father is abusive after seeing him rudely fetch Steven home while refusing to explain his neck bruise (actually caused by the monstrous man), she trails them. Before Steven is abused, the man manifests and stuffs him into a burlap sack before killing Steven's father. He also kills Ms. Lorne when she comes in, leaving Steven unresponsive by the time the police arrive. Dr. Stenson narrates the events afterward: Steven is transferred to the sanitarium where he remains a catatonic, hallucinating the monstrous man well into adulthood, yet Stenson can sometimes see him smiling while looking at the sky.

=== Up to the Last Man ===
Presented in an anachronistic order, the segment tells the story of a college professor called James Silo (Lou Diamond Phillips), who is also an avid conspiracy theorist of the Mayan 2012 doomsday prophesy. He believes that on 21 December 2012, the planet Nibiru will collide with the Earth and to protect himself and his family, he builds a bunker underground, containing a small bedroom and working room, hydroponic culture to sustain food, and a heater. Throughout the segment, it became apparent that James' obsession has distanced himself from reality; his students began to leave his class until no one is left, and he is dismissed from his university. He ignores his wife, Allison, and sons Caleb and Kyle and has spent his savings to build the bunker. Eventually, Allison decides to call the staff from the sanitarium to confine James, yet he manages to escape and lives in the bunker for over 640 days, believing that he was the last man left and that his family was dead. What James does not learn until the end, however, is that he was the one who killed them after escaping from the sanitarium. In grief, James swallows a pill and opens the bunker to find Allison framed by a white light. She catches him when he falls, caresses him, and says that everything is alright. The segment is closed with a scene from before James escaped from the sanitarium. While being interviewed by Dr. Stenson, he states his belief that everything is an illusion and that "they" are laughing at him.

A mid-credits scene shows Stenson discovering James having escaped the sanitarium and left his doomsday timer under the pillow, followed by the first scene of the segment: James waking up to his 640th day in the bunker.

== Cast ==
- Malcolm McDowell as Dr. Stenson

=== Figuratively Speaking ===
- John Glover as Gustav
- Robert Englund as Sam
- Walter Perez as Mateo
- Mayra Leal as Isabelle

=== Monsters are Real ===
- David Mazouz as Steven
- Lacey Chabert as Ms. Lorne
- Chris Mulkey as Father
- Brant Bumpers as Creature
- Mark Cantu as Police Officer

=== Up to the Last Man ===
- Lou Diamond Phillips as James Silo
- Nova Aragon as Allison Silo
- Joseph Rivera as Caleb Silo
- Ryder Maldonado as Kyle Silo
- Dianah McGreehan as Dr. Williams
- Venda D'Abato as Reflection

== Production ==
Valderrama began developing Sanitarium around 2011 and wrote the segments Figuratively Speaking and Up To the Last Man with his writing partner C. M. Bratton. He approached Ramirez and Ortiz with the intention of each of the three directors directing one of the film's stories. Ortiz liked the film's concept, as it reminded him of the 1973 film, Tales That Witness Madness, and the 1980s horror series, Tales from the Crypt. Filming for all three segments was done in Texas, and each segment was completed in five days. St. Anthony Catholic High School and the area of Monte Vista in San Antonio was used for the second sequence.

Valderrama experienced some difficulty while shooting his segment, Up to the Last Man, as the filming location was on "the second story of a warehouse in between a highway and a train station, in July, with no air conditioning." Valderrama also researched doomsday preppers for the segment, as he wanted the actions of James Silo to seem realistic. Ramirez also performed research for Figuratively Speaking, in addition to drawing from his personal experience as an artist.

== Reception ==
Critical reception for Sanitarium has been mixed. The movie received praise from Ain't It Cool News, who wrote that the anthology was "a pretty good one" but expressed some frustration that the dialogue from the mental health physicians was not entirely accurate to how they spoke to patients in real life but also noted that this was a common problem in cinema. Starburst gave the film 7 out of 10 stars, remarking that the film wasn't perfect but that it "does make the most of what it has". In contrast, the San Antonio Current criticized the film as "not very interesting" and remarked that "Wrapping up each segment with a thought-provoking morale would have served the film better. Instead, Sanitarium goes for the cliché and easy way out". Shock Till You Drop panned Sanitarium, praising its production values while opining that it was "too bad such a production went into such bad stories."
