= Slow Burn (2000 film) =

- Directed by: Christian Ford
- Written by: Christian Ford; Roger Soffer
- Produced by: Robert Swanson; Kate Driver; Roger Soffer; Brian Agnew; James Agnew
- Starring: Minnie Driver; James Spader; Josh Brolin; Stuart Wilson
- Cinematography: Mark Vicente
- Edited by: Jack Hofstra; Troy Takaki
- Music by: Anthony Marinelli
- Production company: Blue Rider Pictures; Morlaw Films
- Distributed by: Artisan Entertainment
- Release date: 12 September 2000
- Country: United States
- Language: English
- Budget: $10,000,000

Slow Burn is a 2000 drama film directed by Christian Ford and starring Minnie Driver, James Spader, Stuart Wilson, and Josh Brolin. It is a very loose adaptation of the 1899 novel McTeague by Frank Norris.

== Plot ==
Trina (Driver) continues a family quest to find diamonds hidden deep in the desert long after her parents death. Her search comes to fruition when two escaped convicts (Spader and Brolin), having found the diamonds, stumble onto Trina's path. An old family friend (Wilson) watches events unfold from a distance.

== Cast ==
- Minnie Driver as Trina McTeague
- James Spader as Marcus
- Stuart Wilson as Frank Norris
- Josh Brolin as Duster
- Chris Mulkey as Jacob McTeague
- Caprice Benedetti as Catalina McTeague
