= The Wash (1988 film) =

- Directed by: Michael Toshiyuki Uno
- Written by: Philip Kan Gotanda
- Based on: The Wash by Philip Kan Gotanda
- Starring: Mako; Nobu McCarthy; Sab Shimono; Patti Yasutake
- Cinematography: Walt Lloyd
- Edited by: Jay Freund
- Music by: John Morris
- Production company: American Playhouse
- Distributed by: Skouras Pictures
- Release dates: August 17, 1988 (New York City); September 15, 1988 (TIFF)
- Running time: 94 minutes
- Country: United States
- Language: English

The Wash is a 1988 American film directed by Michael Toshiyuki Uno and starring Mako and Nobu McCarthy. It was written by Philip Kan Gotanda, adapted from his 1985 play of the same name. It tells the story of a newly separated nisei couple, husband Nobu and wife Masi, and their individual and collective struggles with their past, which along with their marriage centered on Japanese tradition, despite their residing in the United States.

== Plot ==
After what is implied to be many stressful years of mistreatment, Masi has recently left Nobu early in the story, due to his intolerably sexist nature, is able to move on, and begins dating the widower doctor Sadao. Nobu does not similarly move on and begins to panic at the loss of Masi, although he still dates widowed restaurant owner Kiyoko as a way to get free meals. As a result of Masi's "abandonment", as Nobu tends to classify it, Nobu is forced to confront both his traumatic memories of the Japanese American internment camps, which the story establishes as the root of his inflexible nature, and the reality of the consequences this inflexibility has finally produced for him. Nobu's long-running feud with his youngest daughter Judy stems from his refusal to acknowledge his daughter's marriage to a Black man and their multi-ethnic child. Nobu eventually accepts Judy's son Timothy as a grandchild, but the story does not end with any reunion between Masi and Nobu; Masi not only stays with Sadao but she also, symbolically in the final scene, refuses to any longer launder Nobu's clothes for him, as she had during all their years of marriage. It is this aspect of the plot from which the story's name is obtained. Nobu ends up alone, with Masi divorcing him so that she can marry Sadao; Nobu does not speak to her during her last visit, while at the same time, refuses to return Kiyoko's phone calls and the potential for a future relationship.

== Cast ==
- Mako as Nobu Matsumoto
- Nobu McCarthy as Masi Matsumoto
- Sab Shimono as Sadao
- Patti Yasutake as Marsha

== Production ==
The Wash was first performed as a play in 1985; Gotanda then wrote the screenplay for the 1988 independent film version. Nobu McCarthy reprised her role from the stage production for the movie, while Sab Shimono switched roles: Shimono played Sadao, the part originated by George Takei, while Mako Iwamatsu played Nobu for the movie.

== Reception ==
Sheila Benson of the Los Angeles Times wrote "The Wash is imperfectly directed but not unmoving and full of complex, very real issues. Here, they apply to a Japanese-American couple who are internment camp veterans, and to their Sansei [sic] children. However, they are the issues of every culture: whether a bad marriage is better than no marriage at all; how much we owe a partner and how much we owe ourselves, and whether one can find one’s real identity after decades of neglect and shabby treatment." Writing for The Washington Post, Hal Hinson wrote the film "sticks closely by the sociological details of the Japanese and their community, but we can't help wanting something to stir us, something that's not merely accurate and well observed, but that galvanizes us".

The film was nominated for three Independent Spirit Awards, including Best First Feature, Best Female Lead, and Best Supporting Female.
