= Patti Rocks =

- Film poster
- Directed by: David Burton Morris
- Written by: John Jenkins; Karen Landry; David Burton Morris; Chris Mulkey
- Produced by: Gregory M. Cummins; Gwen Field
- Starring: John Jenkins; Karen Landry; Chris Mulkey
- Cinematography: Gregory M. Cummins
- Edited by: Gregory M. Cummins
- Music by: Doug Maynard
- Production company: FilmDallas Pictures
- Distributed by: FilmDallas Pictures
- Release date: January 15, 1988
- Running time: 86 minutes
- Country: United States
- Language: English
- Budget: $350,000

Patti Rocks is a 1988 comedy film directed by David Burton Morris starring John Jenkins, Karen Landry, and Chris Mulkey.

== Plot ==
In Minneapolis just before Christmas, fortysomething Billy persuades his old friend Eddie, who he has not seen for six months, to listen to his story. While working on barges between the Twin Cities and La Crosse, Wisconsin, Billy met and slept with Patti, who now says she is pregnant. As she refuses to talk on the phone with him, Billy wants a friend to accompany him on a visit to her La Crosse home to explain that as a married man and a father of two, he would prefer she not have the child. The pair drive through the night, drinking beer and talking crudely about women. At a stop, when an older woman challenges Billy to have sex with her, his machismo is revealed as immature bluster.

Arriving at Patti's apartment after midnight, Eddie is surprised to find that Patti is actually a strong-willed, fiercely independent woman—nothing how Billy described her. Patti tells Billy she will go ahead and have the baby and wants nothing from him. She then shuts herself in her bedroom. Billy begs Eddie to speak to her, and she lets him in. After discussing their lonely lives—he, divorced, and she, preferring freedom—tenderly they make love. Billy looks in and sees he is no longer wanted. As he prepares to drive Eddie home, Patti takes a photograph of him to give to the child one day. When Eddie asks, Patti says he can call again.

== Cast ==
- Chris Mulkey as Billy Regis
- John Jenkins as Eddie Hassit
- Karen Landry as Patti Rocks

== Production ==
Patti Rocks was written as a sequel to the 1975 film Loose Ends, which was the directorial debut of husband-and-wife pair David Burton Morris and Victoria Wozniak. Loose Ends also starred Chris Mulkey and John Jenkins, both of whom would reprise their roles in Patti Rocks. The actors created approximately twenty hours of improvised dialogue, though Morris maintained to the press that the film was completely scripted.

The film was shot in two weeks in March 1987, in and around Minneapolis–Saint Paul, including such locations as the Rock Island Swing Bridge.

The film was made for a budget of $350,000 (equivalent to $990,000 in 2025).

== Reception ==
=== Release ===
Patti Rocks premiered on January 15, 1988. It was also shown at the 1988 Sundance Film Festival where it competed for the Grand Jury Prize.

=== Ratings controversy ===
The film was initially given an X rating by the MPAA on the basis of its profanities rather than its sexual content. Morris and producer Sam Grogg of FilmDallas Pictures appealed the rating multiple times. Grogg made his case by comparing the number of times the f-word appears in Patti Rocks to that of other R-rated Hollywood productions, such as 1983's Scarface, with Grogg arguing Patti Rocks contained the f-word seventy-three times, in contrast to 206 instances in Scarface. The X rating was then overturned and the film was released with an R rating. As a result of the controversy, the film received publicity and gained visibility.

Filmmaker Kirby Dick, who had worked on Patti Rocks as a first assistant director, would later go on to make the 2006 documentary This Film Is Not Yet Rated, which explores the MPAA and its impact on independent films.

=== Critical response ===
Patti Rocks received positive reviews from critics who praised its examination of male chauvinism and unapologetic female sexuality. Others found the male characters' sexual dialogue to be "needlessly profane." Fred Lutz of The Toledo Blade called it "one of the most comically devastating sex satires since Carnal Knowledge in 1971. It is also just as revealing about the adolescent attitudes some American men have about women and sex, and it is just as explicit and vulgar, if not more so." Rita Kempley of The Washington Post wrote, "Patti Rocks may be an acquired taste. You could think of it as the antithesis of Fatal Attraction. Patti Rocks would thank Michael Douglas for the memories, and get herself a good obstetrician."

Michael Wilmington of the Los Angeles Times noted that while the film's "gutter lingo with harsh verisimilitude...opens up some private pain [and] confronts [the audience] with something flawed, but human", the male characters are ultimately absolved with "too automatic a comeuppance." Janet Maslin of The New York Times was more critical, writing, "The film is interesting in its ambitions to the extent that it tries to contrast and exemplify so many sexual stereotypes and preconceptions. But its style is hopelessly ordinary without being particularly frank, and the level of insight displayed is hardly more engaging." She added, "not until Miss Landry appears is it possible to glimpse what Patti Rocks has been after. Though her character is hackneyed and improbable, Miss Landry projects the subtlety and the furious energy that is so lacking in the story's earlier sections. Patti Rocks is most notable for its exceptional earnestness and for what it might have been. "

Frederic and Mary Ann Brussat of Spirituality & Practice opined, "Karen Landry's portrait of Patti is the best thing about this film. Independent and confident, she decides to have the baby regardless of Billy. With sensitivity, she proves to the burnt-out and self-denigrating Eddie that he is still lovable. As another report on the battle of the sexes, Patti Rocks proves that immature men will always be losers."

Patti Rocks holds an 80% rating on Rotten Tomatoes based on five reviews.

=== Accolades ===
At the 4th Independent Spirit Awards, Patti Rocks was nominated for Best Director, Best Screenplay, Best Cinematography, and Best Actor (Chris Mulkey).
