= Ronald Long =

English actor (1911–1986)

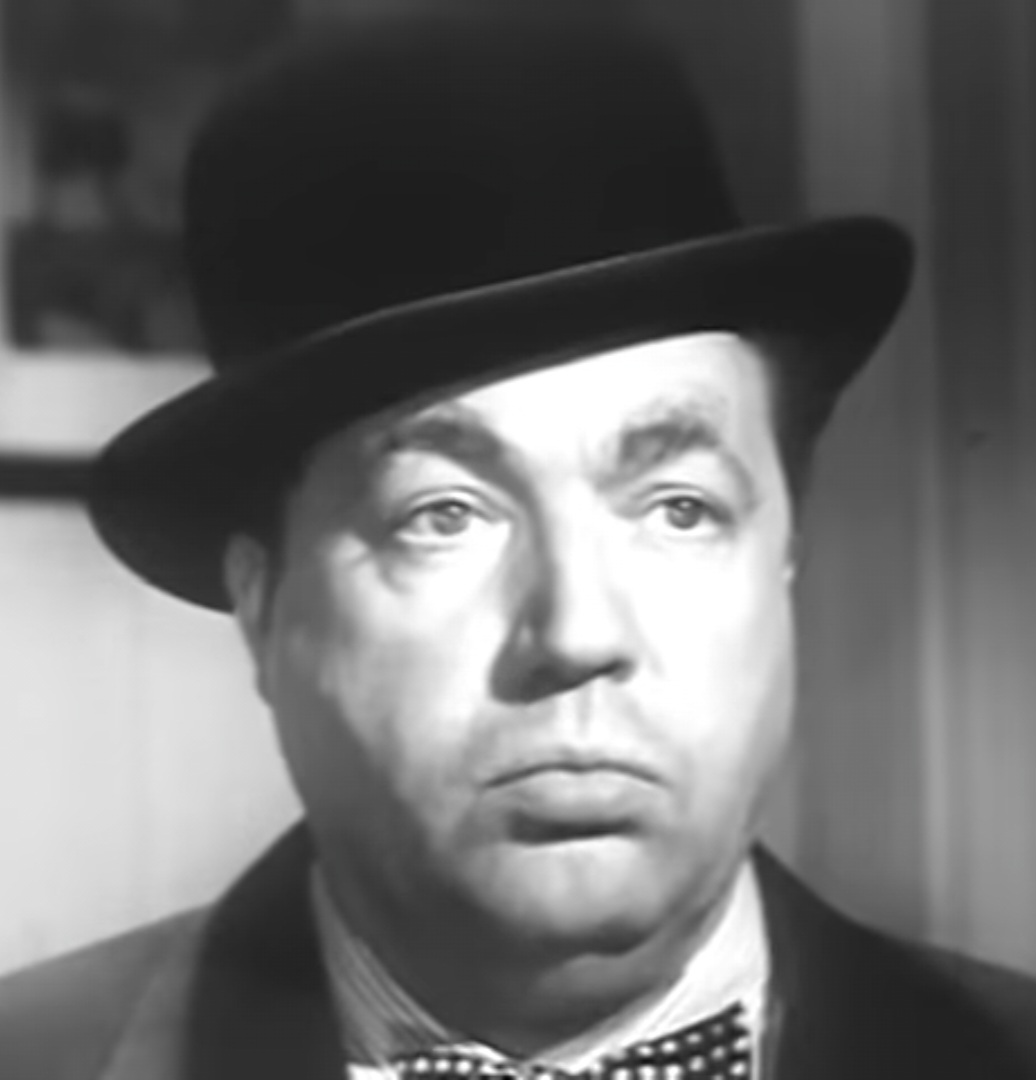
- Long in an episode of One Step Beyond (1960)
- Born: 30 January 1911; London, England
- Died: 23 October 1986 (aged 75); Burbank, California, U.S.
- Occupation: Actor
- Years active: 1936–1976

Ronald Long (30 January 1911 – 23 October 1986), was an English actor who appeared principally in American television shows of the 1950s, 1960s and 1970s.

== Early years ==
Long was born in London and performed at the Old Vic Theatre there before moving to America in the late 1940s.

== Career ==
His longest-running role was portraying Evans Baker on the CBS daytime soap opera Love of Life for four years. His roles on Broadway included the police inspector in the drama A Pin to See the Peep Show (1953), and Dr. Blimber in the comedy Nature's Way (1957). His film debut was in Two Loves (1961).

Long had character roles in 1960s sitcoms, including Get Smart, Hogan's Heroes, I Dream of Jeannie, and Green Acres. He had several roles on Bewitched, including Henry VIII. He appeared three times on Perry Mason. Other TV appearances include parts on Alfred Hitchcock Presents, Lost in Space, Batman, The Time Tunnel, The Man From U.N.C.L.E., Mission: Impossible, Mannix and Columbo.

Long also appeared as a picky eater in a Stan Freberg advertisement for Sunsweet Pitted Prunes.

== Death ==
Long died at the age of 75 in Burbank, California.

== Filmography ==
Year	Title	Role	Notes
1959	The Naked Road	Wayne Jackson	
1961	Two Loves	Headmaster Reardon	
1962	The Notorious Landlady	Coroner	
1962	Five Weeks in a Balloon	Chiddingfold	Uncredited
1963	The Man from the Diners' Club	Minister	
1963	The List of Adrian Messenger	Carstairs	
1963	The Alfred Hitchcock Hour	Major Hart	Season 2 Episode 1: "A Home Away from Home"
1966	Assault on a Queen	Officer #2	
1967	The Wild Wild West	Sultan of Ramapur	
1967	Lost in Space	Admiral Zahrk	
1967	Batman	Karnaby Katz	
1968– 1971	Bewitched	McTavish the ghost giant from "Jack and the Beanstalk"; Santa Claus magistrate in old Salem; King Henry VIII (two-part episode)	
1968– 1969	I Dream of Jeannie	Sir Widgin Willingham; Uncle Azmire	
1969	Green Acres	Waiter	
1969	Hogan's Heroes	Major Blair	
1969– 1970	Get Smart	Leadside; Montague Leach	
1970	R. P. M.	5th Professor at Dining Table	Uncredited
1970	Hawaii Five-O (1968 TV series)	Dr. Hans Kreuter	Season 2 Episode 22: "Nightmare Road"
