= Two Loves =

1961 film

- Theatrical release poster
- Directed by: Charles Walters
- Screenplay by: Ben Maddow
- Based on: Spinster; 1958 novel by Sylvia Ashton-Warner
- Produced by: Julian Blaustein
- Starring: Shirley MacLaine; Laurence Harvey; Jack Hawkins; Nobu McCarthy
- Cinematography: Joseph Ruttenberg
- Edited by: Fredric Steinkamp
- Music by: Bronislau Kaper
- Production company: Julian Blaustein Productions
- Distributed by: Metro-Goldwyn Mayer
- Release date: June 21, 1961
- Running time: 96 minutes
- Country: United States
- Language: English
- Budget: $2 million
- Box office: $1 million

Two Loves is a 1961 American drama film directed by Charles Walters and starring Shirley MacLaine, Laurence Harvey, Jack Hawkins, and Nobu McCarthy. It was adapted from the book Spinster by Sylvia Ashton-Warner. It was entered into the 11th Berlin International Film Festival.

== Plot ==
Anna Vorontosov is an American teacher at a rural school on New Zealand's North Island. Her unorthodox teaching methods have won her the adoration of her classroom, which consists mostly of Māori students. One morning, she learns that new superintendent William W. J. Abercrombie has stopped by her classroom. Worried, Anna talks to the headmaster Mr. Reardon about how she can best present her class before him. They decide that having an assistant teacher is the best option.

Anna goes to her colleague Paul Lathrope, a motorcycle-riding British-born teacher, about finding an assistant. They both choose Whareparita, a teenaged Māori girl. Paul then expresses interest in getting to know Anna, but she brushes off his advances. When Anna and Whareparita return to the classroom, Anna is amazed to see her students well-behaved and learn that Abercrombie had instructed them so. Anna scolds Abercrombie for his interference, to which he states he only wanted to borrow a book written by her students.

During recess, Mark Cutter, one of Anna's few Caucasian students, tells her that Matawhero, his Māori classmate and best friend, has run away and will not return to school. Incensed, Anna arrives at the Māori village, where she converses with his grandfather Chief Rauhuia. Matawhero, who has been eavesdropping, explains he ran away because someone hit him with a big stick, though he refuses to name who. Anna persuades Matawhero to return to school, and when they do, Anna learns from his reaction it was Paul.

After Anna berates Paul for discipling her students, Paul admits that he feels he is not a qualified teacher. He also intends to quit at the end of the term and become a singer. Anna softens her perspective towards him, and they agree to an evening date. At her house, Paul sings a German song while Anna plays the piano. Paul thinks he sings great, but Anna provides some constructive criticism, which he does not take well. Paul asks to stay with her for the night, but Anna prudishly refuses. As he storms off, Anna states her true relationship is with her students.

During one of her classes, Abercrombie arrives and is impressed with one of the stories from the book he had borrowed. Anna passionately tells him that the children will learn only if they feel. Outside of the school, Anna repeatedly encounters Paul, and while she is attracted to him, Anna refuses to submit to his advances.

One day, while shopping for school supplies, Anna reports to Abercrombie about Paul. Abercrombie is aware of Paul, who has a troubled past, but has steadily refused to fire him, believing Paul is a man of passion. Anna also learns that Abercrombie is from England, but his wife and son have left for London while he stays in New Zealand.

During class, as they inspect their students for lice, Anna takes notice of Whareparita, who is maturing into womanhood. Later on, Whareparita faints, having become pregnant though she refuses to divulge the father's identity as he will not raise the child. Instead, she knows her village will raise the child. Anna is appalled and shocked by the entire situation.

Abercrombie talks to Anna about publishing the book as a pilot project with the blessing of the school's council. Anna is shocked but pleased, but she will not allow them to make any requested editorial changes without the children's consent.

Late one evening, Paul becomes drunk and is killed when his motorcycle crashes over a hill and bursts into flames. At Paul's funeral, Anna realizes Paul is the one who impregnated Whareparita. A remorseful Anna believes Paul was suicidal and had she not turned down his advances, he would have still been alive. However, Abercrombie knows Paul's death was accidental and that Anna's feeling of guilt is unjustified. He admits to Anna that he loves her and plans to divorce his wife regardlessly. Anna hugs him.

At the school, walking side by side, Abercrombie happily whistles as Anna goes into her classroom.

== Cast ==
- Shirley MacLaine as Anna Vorontosov
- Laurence Harvey as Paul Lathrope
- Jack Hawkins as William W.J. Abercrombie
- Nobu McCarthy as Whareparita
- Ronald Long as Headmaster Reardon
- Norah Howard as Mrs. Cutter
- Juano Hernandez as Rauhuia

== Production ==
By March 1959, MGM had purchased the rights to Sylvia Ashton-Warner's novel Spinster. Four months later, Ben Maddow was hired to write the screenplay. Ashton-Warner read the script and therefore declined to have anything to do with the film. She later commented: "Judging by the script I read, I believe [the film] would have deserved every harsh word it got. I particularly liked the critic who said it was a minor film but a major disgrace."

Sol C. Siegel, MGM's head of production, assigned Charles Walters to direct the film. By August 1960, Shirley MacLaine, Laurence Harvey, and Jack Hawkins were announced as the principal cast members, with plans to shoot on location in New Zealand by October. However, the location shoot was cancelled due to the inclement weather conditions and forecast rainy season within the Wellington Region. Dissatisfied with the advanced second unit footage, Walters stated, "I didn't see how we could justify the enormous expense to go and film there." The film was shot instead on the MGM sound stages in Culver City, California. Kīngi Īhaka, an Anglican Māori missionary, was hired as a technical advisor.

Principal photography began in October 1960. During filming, Walters was forced to rearrange Harvey's shooting schedule as he was needed for Summer and Smoke (1961) by November 19. Therefore, he filmed Harvey's scenes first. Furthermore, Harvey and MacLaine did not get along on set. In her 1995 memoir, MacLaine stated she felt Harvey was "insensitive and pompous".

In November 1960, Walters told The New York Times: "This is absolutely murderous. We have got to do all our key scenes in one bunch. Every day and every moment is a climactic scene. I have never done anything like this before. I never want to do anything like this again. There is not enough time for anything, least of all, time for rehearsal, which is particularly important in this sort of rush situation." Harvey agreed, in which he stated "this is not the ideal way of filming because it puts too much strain on the actor." MacLaine uttered a derisive, one-word rebuttal.

== Reception ==
=== Box office ===
Two Loves earned $425,000 in the U.S. and Canada and $650,000 in other markets, resulting in a loss of $1,773,000.

=== Critical reaction ===
Critical reaction to Two Loves were unfavorable. A. H. Weiler of The New York Times described it as "nothing better than a murky drama despite the lovely colors in which it was filmed. The problems of the amour-harried principals, though seriously stated, seem as distant as New Zealand, in which it all takes place." Larry Tubelle of Variety noted the "physical production itself is first-class", but overall concluded: "Unfortunately, the personal story emerges less lucid than its broader overtones." Harrison's Reports wrote more positively: "The rather unusual plot, the marquee strength of its stars, and the fascinating foreign backgrounds — photographed in CinemaScope and MetroColor — all add up to fine box-office, with special appeal to women."

The New York Herald Tribune wrote, "What was a distinct opportunity to probe into a clash of cultures with perhaps consequent insights ... has been allowed to waste away into posturings, heady words, and foggy conclusions". The New York Daily Mirror said it was "somewhat incoherent" and described Harvey's role as "a composite of François Villon and Groucho Marx". The New York Daily News said, "The philosophy is confusing and hard to take; the story, slow and loose, is hard to follow."

In the years since its release, those who worked on Two Loves have denounced the film. In 1972, Charles Walters, the film's director, recounted: "I have bad things to say about the film as it stands now because—in fact—it was sort of castrated." That same year, MacLaine told Daily Variety: "I should have done Breakfast at Tiffany's. I did Two Loves instead, which I think was horrible." Ben Maddow, the film's screenwriter, reflected: "I thought I did a pretty good script, but the director [Charles Walters] on that was terrible." In 2011, MacLaine reiterated Two Loves was "a terrible movie no one has ever heard of."

== Bibliography ==
- MacLaine, Shirley (1995). My Lucky Stars: A Hollywood Memoir. New York: Bantam Books. ISBN 978-0-5530-9717-7.
- McGilligan, Patrick (1991). "Ben Maddow: The Invisible Man". Backstory 2: Interviews with Screenwriters of the 1940s and 1950s. University of California Press. ISBN 978-0-5202-0908-4.
- Phillips, Brent (2014). Charles Walters: The Director Who Made Hollywood Dance. University Press of Kentucky. ISBN 978-0-8131-4723-9.
