= White Plains Rural Cemetery =

Historic cemetery in New York, United States

- U.S. National Register of Historic Places
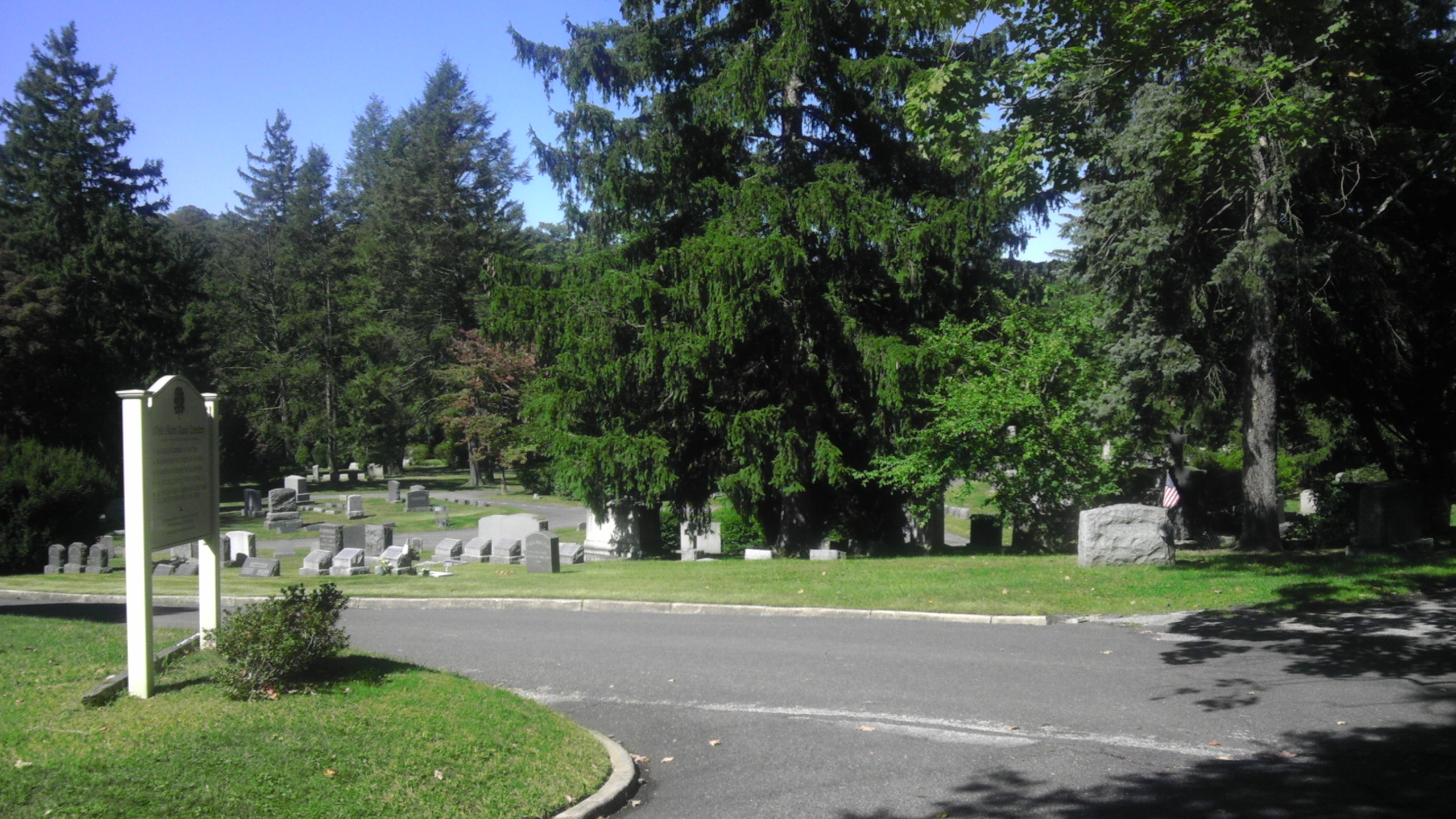

- Location within New York Location within the United States
- Location: 167 N. Broadway, White Plains, New York
- Coordinates: 41°2′50″N 73°46′20″W
- Area: 26 acres (11 ha)
- Built: 1854
- Architect: Jenkins, John F.
- Architectural style: Rural Cemetery
- NRHP reference No.: 03000247
- Added to NRHP: September 19, 2003

White Plains Rural Cemetery is a historic cemetery located in the city of White Plains, Westchester County, New York. The cemetery was organized in 1854 and designed in 1855. It contains miles of narrow, paved roads, none of which are in a straight line. The roads create circular and lozenge-shaped areas for burials. Also on the property is a former church, now a cemetery office. It was built in 1797, and is a 2 1/2-story, five-by-three-bay frame building with a high-pitched gable roof. It was modified for office use in 1881.

The cemetery was added to the National Register of Historic Places on September 19, 2003.

== Graves of notable people ==
- Olivia Hooker (1915-2018), American psychologist, professor, and was the last known survivor of the Tulsa race massacre
- Carl Williams (1959–2013), an American boxer
- Ralph Waite (1928–2014), an American actor

== Gallery ==
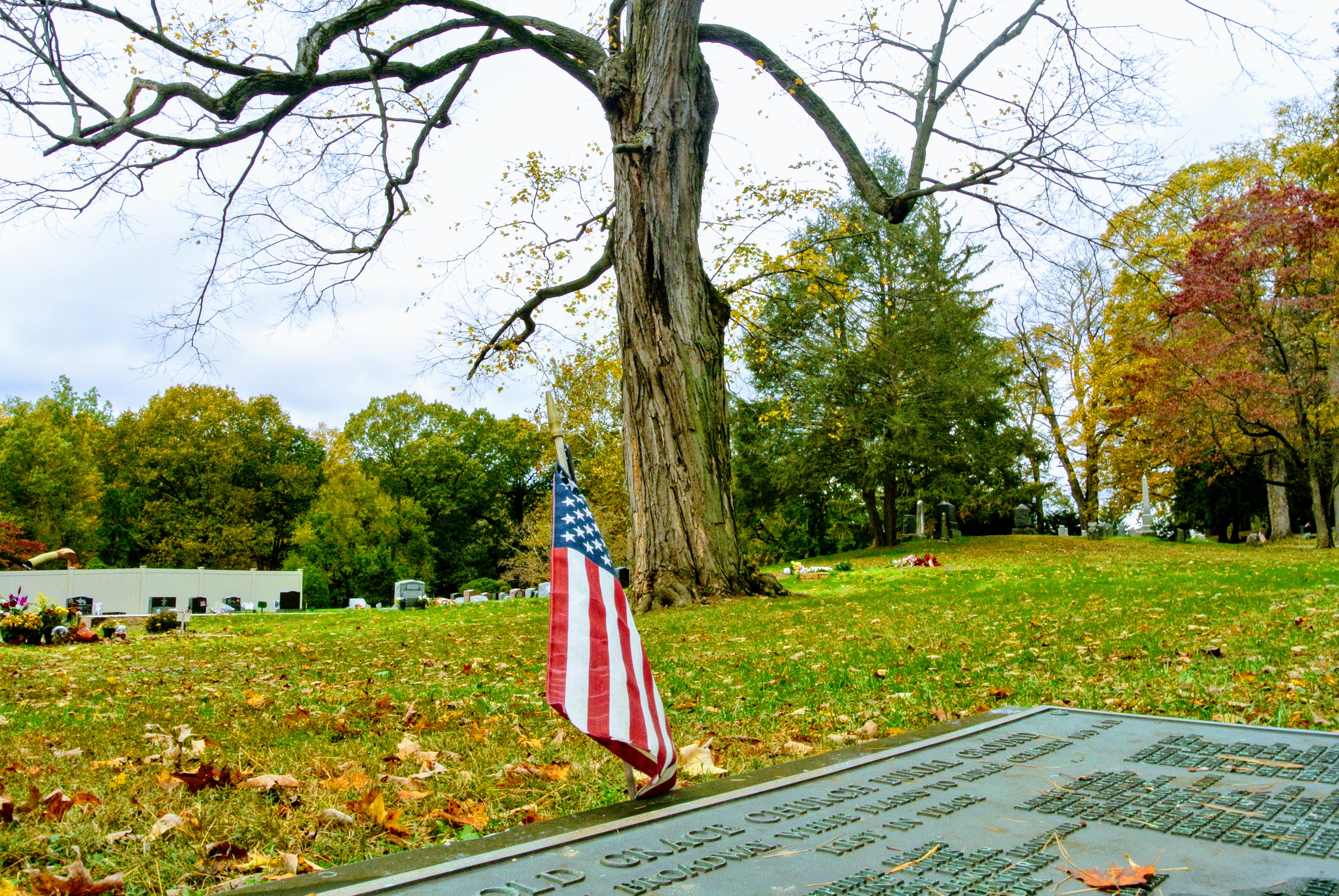
Memorial for the Old Grace Church Burial Ground

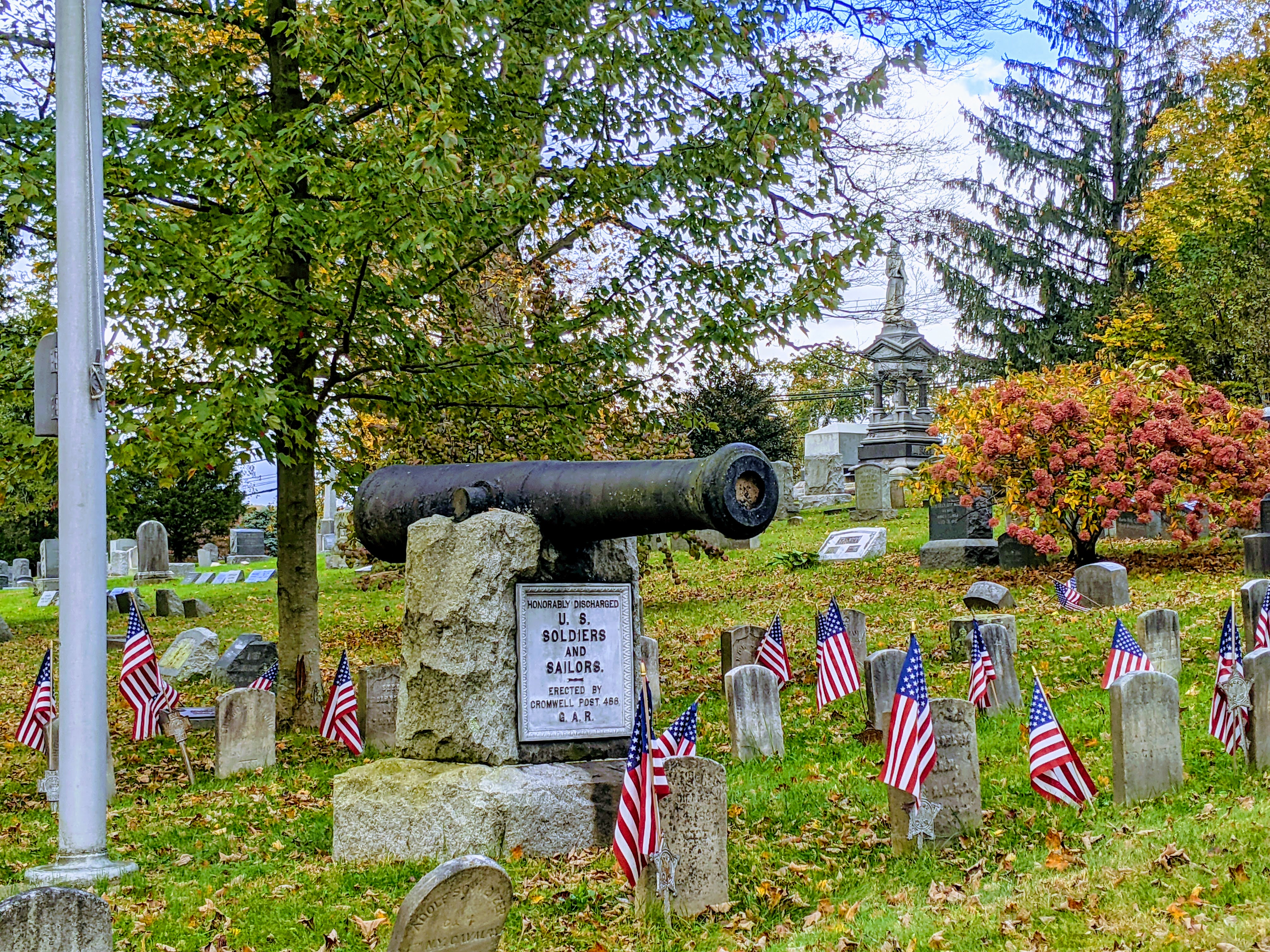
Veterans graves and civil war era cannon

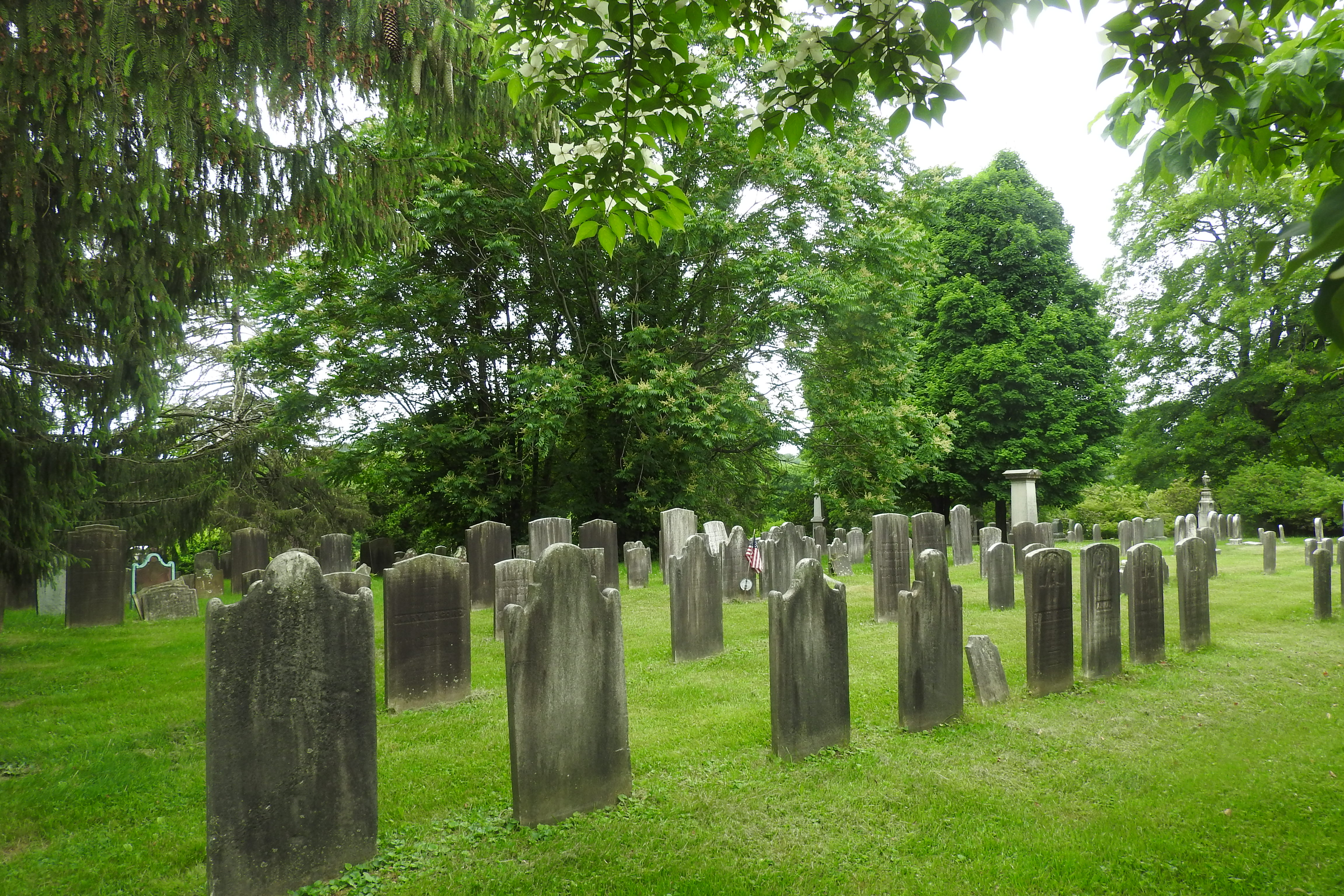
Early tombstones

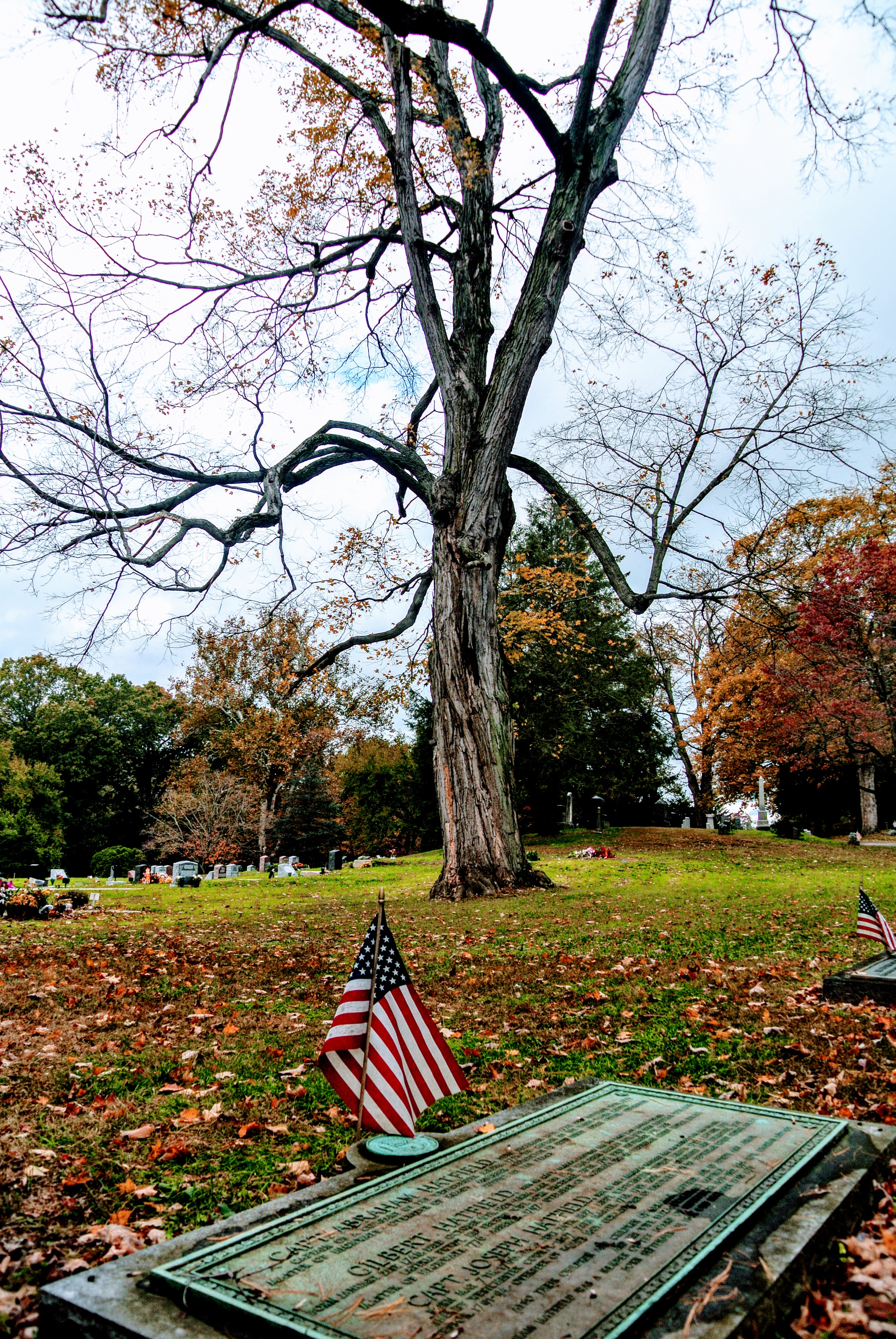
Captain Abraham Hatfield, Tory, and his family memorial
