= Patti Yasutake =

American actress (1953–2024)

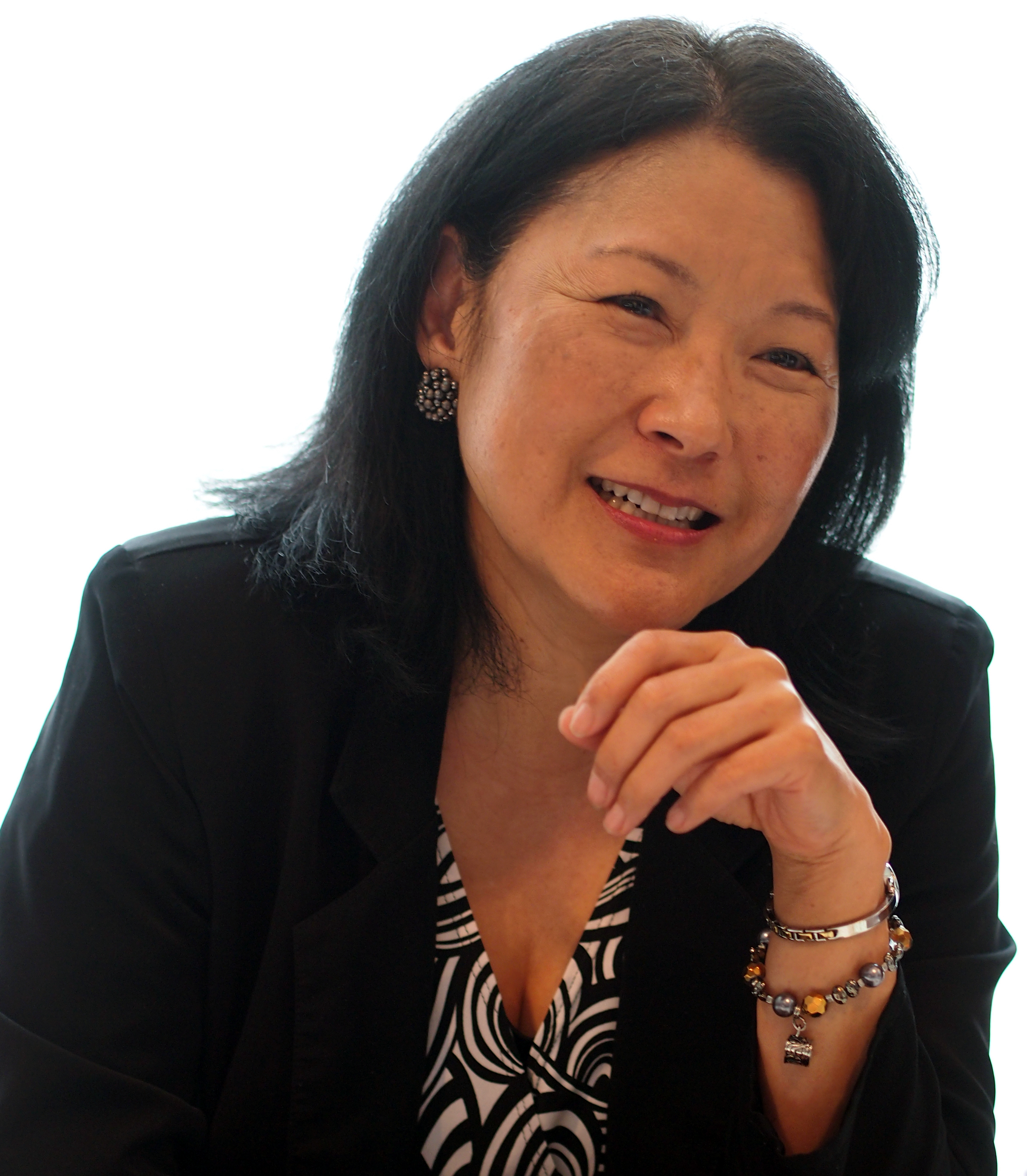
- Yasutake in 2013
- Born: September 6, 1953; Gardena, California, U.S.
- Died: August 5, 2024 (aged 70); Santa Monica, California, U.S.
- Occupation: Actress
- Years active: 1985–2024

Patti Yasutake (September 6, 1953 – August 5, 2024) was an American stage, film and television actress. She was best known for her portrayal of Nurse Alyssa Ogawa in the Star Trek franchise. She was the sister of Irene Hirano.

== Life and career ==
Yasutake was born on September 6, 1953, in Gardena, California.

Yasutake's television acting career began in 1985 with an appearance on the show T. J. Hooker. More recently, she appeared on Boston Legal. She resided in Hollywood, California.

She was nominated for an Independent Spirit Award for Best Supporting Female in 1988 for her role in The Wash.

Yasutake died of a rare form of T-cell lymphoma at the UCLA Santa Monica Medical Center, on August 5, 2024, at the age of 70.

== Partial filmography ==
- Tales of Meeting and Parting (1984)
- Gung Ho (1986) – Umeki
- Gung Ho (1986) (TV series) – Umeki Kazuhiro
- The Wash (1988) – Marsha
- Tales from the Crypt (1989) - Newscaster
- Without Warning: The James Brady Story (1991) (TV movie) – Therapist
- Fatal Friendship (1991) (TV movie) – Ling Landrum
- Stop! Or My Mom Will Shoot (1992) – TV Newscaster Leslie
- Blind Spot (1993) (TV movie) – Dr. Charbonneau
- Donato and Daughter (1993) (TV movie) – Dr. Stewart
- Lush Life (1993) (TV movie) – Doctor
- Star Trek: The Next Generation (1994) – Nurse Alyssa Ogawa (16 episodes)
- Star Trek Generations (1994) – Nurse Alyssa Ogawa
- Dangerous Intentions (1995) – Lois
- Abandoned and Deceived (1995) (TV movie)
- Road to Galveston (1996) (TV movie) – Nurse Dickerson
- Star Trek: First Contact (1996) – Nurse Alyssa Ogawa
- Clockwatchers (1997) – Theater Woman (uncredited)
- A Face to Kill For (1999) – D.A. Rowland
- Drop Dead Gorgeous (1999) – Mrs. Howard
- The Mutant Watch (2000) (TV movie)
- Star Trek: Armada II (2001) (voice) – Additional Voices
- ER (2003) – Kito
- Cold Case (2007) (TV Series) – Barbara Takahashi
- Unbelievable!!!!! (2020) – Dr. Beverly Krasher
- Beef (2023) (TV series) – Fumi
- Like a Dragon: Infinite Wealth (2024) (voice) – Akane Kishida
