= Nobu McCarthy =

Canadian actress (1934–2002)

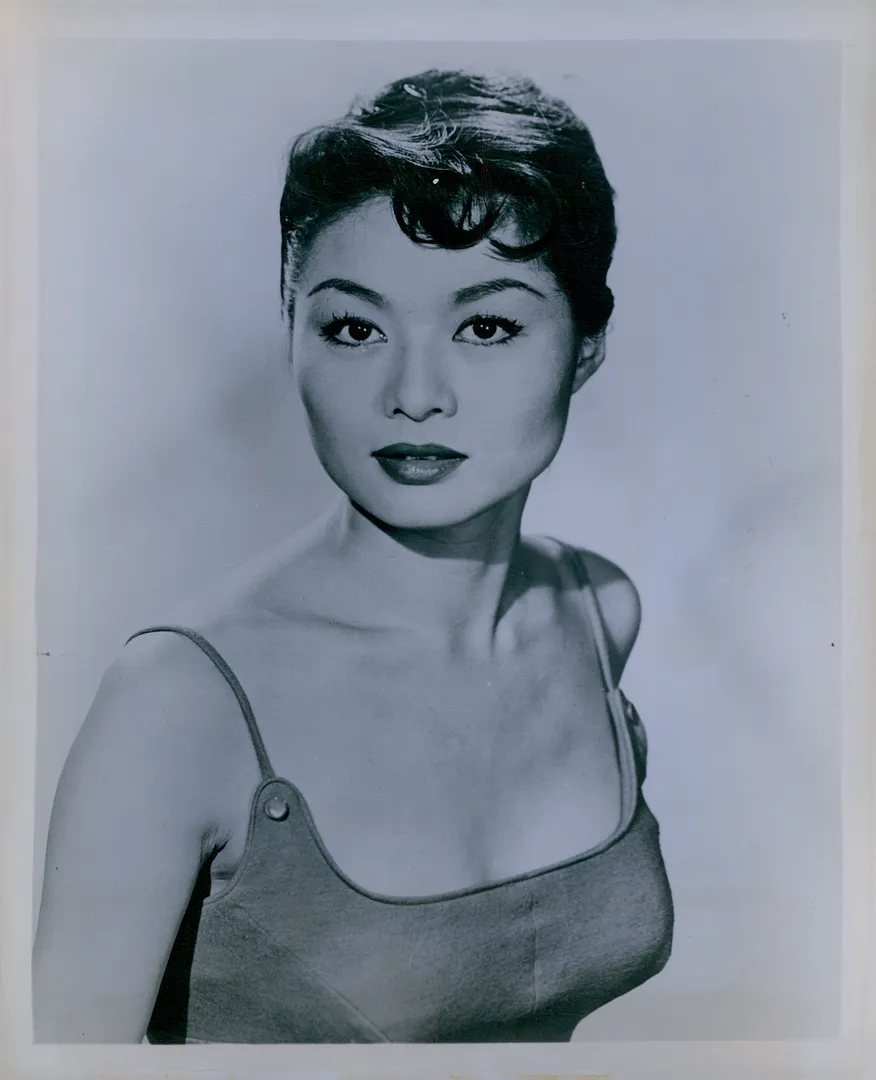
- McCarthy in a publicity photo for Johnny Staccato (1959–1960)
- Born: Nobu Atsumi; November 13, 1934; Ottawa, Ontario, Canada
- Died: April 6, 2002 (aged 67); Londrina, Paraná, Brazil
- Occupation: Actress
- Years active: 1958–2002
- Spouses: David McCarthy (m. 1955; div. 1970) William Cuthbert (m. 1976; died 1997)
- Children: 2

Nobu McCarthy (Japanese: ノブ・マッカーシー, born Nobu Atsumi (渥美 延); November 13, 1934 – April 6, 2002) was a Canadian actress. She received a nomination for the Independent Spirit Award for Best Female Lead for her performance in the film The Wash.

== Early life ==
McCarthy was born Nobu Atsumi in Ottawa, Ontario, the daughter of Masaji and Yuki Atsumi. Her father was a Japanese fashion designer and diplomatic attaché stationed in Canada at the time. She was raised in Japan, where she studied ballet. A modeling career eventually led to a beauty pageant in which she won the title of "Miss Tokyo".

== Career ==
=== Film ===
While shopping in the Little Tokyo district of Los Angeles, McCarthy was discovered by talent agent Fred Ishimoto, which led to her film debut in the Jerry Lewis film The Geisha Boy (1958). In 1960, she appeared in the comedy film Wake Me When It's Over. In 1961 she starred alongside Shirley MacLaine and Laurence Harvey in the MGM movie Two Loves where she played a young Maori woman. 1963 saw her appear in an uncredited background role in the comedy drama Love with the Proper Stranger starring Steve McQueen and Natalie Wood. In the next decade, McCarthy continued acting in a small number of television films and making numerous appearances in television episodes throughout the 1970s, 1980s and 1990s. She had some minor roles in a handful of movies including The Karate Kid Part II (1986).

=== Television ===
She starred with Lloyd Bridges in a 1959 Sea Hunt television episode as a Hawaiian woman fighting to protect pearl beds from poachers. She appeared in the 1960 episode "Princess of Crazy Creek" of the syndicated western TV series Pony Express, starring Grant Sullivan. In 1961, she appeared as Haru in the Laramie TV series episode "Dragon at the Door". She also appeared in the ABC adventure dramas Adventures in Paradise and The Islanders. In 1962 she appeared in the television series Wagon Train in the episode "The John Augustus Story" as Mayleen. She made two guest appearances on Perry Mason: in 1959 she played defendant Mitsou Kamuri in "The Case of the Blushing Pearls," and in 1965 she played Sally Choshi in "The Case of the Wrongful Writ".

She also guest starred on ABC's The Bing Crosby Show in the 1964–1965 season. In the final, 1966, season of Mister Ed, she played Mei Ling, a Chinese restaurant manager and spy. She starred with Robert Conrad in the final episode of the first season of The Wild Wild West, dated April 22, 1966 "The Night of the Sudden Plague" as a Chinese woman "Anna Kirby", who is the daughter of a mad professor breeding bacteria for a serum that causes temporary paralysis. She also made appearances in Batman, The Man From U.N.C.L.E., and Hawaii Five-O. In 1973, she appeared in a second-season episode of Kung Fu. In 1976, she appeared in an episode of Barney Miller as prostitute/robbery victim Dorothy Murakami. She then starred in the television movie Farewell to Manzanar, based on the novel of the same title. She made an appearance in an episode of the television sitcoms Happy Days and Diff'rent Strokes. She appeared in three episodes of The Love Boat. In the 1980s she appeared in episodes of T.J. Hooker, Magnum P.I., and China Beach.

=== Theater and independent film ===
In 1971, McCarthy joined East West Players, an Asian American theatre group in Los Angeles. In 1986, she had a supporting role opposite Pat Morita in the film The Karate Kid Part II.

Her starring role in the indie feature The Wash, opposite Mako, earned her an Independent Spirit Award nomination in 1989. That same year she replaced Mako as artistic director of East West Players, a position she held until 1993. During this time, McCarthy also taught theatre at California State University, Los Angeles and UCLA. East West Players presented McCarthy with a lifetime achievement award in 1996, and the Visionary Award in 1999. McCarthy also did the voice-overs at the beginning and end of Picture Bride.

== Personal life ==
In 1955, she married David McCarthy, with whom she had two children. They divorced in 1970. In 1976, she married William Cuthbert, though she kept McCarthy as her stage name.

== Death ==
On April 6, 2002, McCarthy died at the age of 67 from a ruptured aortic aneurysm while she was on location in Brazil, filming Gaijin - Ama-me Como Sou.

== Filmography ==
Year	Title	Role	Notes
1958	The Hunters	Japanese Clerk	Uncredited
1958	The Geisha Boy	Kimi Sikita	
1959	Tokyo After Dark	B-Girl	Uncredited
1959	Five Gates to Hell	Chioko	
1960	Wake Me When It's Over	Ume Tanaka	
1960	Walk Like a Dragon	Kim Sung	
1961	Two Loves	Whareparita	
1963	Love with the Proper Stranger	Yuki	Uncredited
1986	The Karate Kid Part II	Yukie	
1988	The Wash	Masi Matsumoto	
1990	Pacific Heights	Mira Watanabe	
1993	Painted Desert	Sari Hatano	
1999	Last Chance	Miss Bea	
2005	Gaijin 2: Love Me as I Am	Shinobu (old)	Final film role

== See also ==
- Portrayal of East Asians in Hollywood
- Stereotypes of East Asians in the United States
