= Five Corners (film) =

1987 film by Tony Bill

- Theatrical release poster
- Directed by: Tony Bill
- Written by: John Patrick Shanley
- Produced by: Forrest Murray; Tony Bill
- Starring: Jodie Foster; Tim Robbins; Todd Graff; John Turturro
- Cinematography: Fred Murphy
- Edited by: Andy Blumenthal
- Music by: James Newton Howard
- Production company: HandMade Films
- Distributed by: Cineplex Odeon Films
- Release dates: May 1987 (Cannes Film Festival); September 11, 1987 (Finland); January 22, 1988 (USA)
- Running time: 90 min
- Country: United States
- Language: English
- Budget: $5.5 million
- Box office: $969,205

Five Corners is a 1987 American independent crime drama film, directed by Tony Bill, written by John Patrick Shanley, and starring Jodie Foster, Tim Robbins, John Turturro, and Rodney Harvey. The film depicts 48 hours in the lives of a group of four young New Yorkers in the 1960s.

Five Corners was released in limited theatres in the United States on January 22, 1988. The film received generally positive reviews from critics but was a financial disappointment, grossing $969,205 in its limited run against a budget of $5.5 million. At the 4th Independent Spirit Awards, Foster won for Best Female Lead, while Turturro was nominated for Best Supporting Male.

It has been misconstrued as a public domain film and pirated by many distributors who released poor quality VHS and DVD printings. However, as per The Copyright Office, copyright is registered under Paragon Entertainment Corporation.

== Plot ==
In 1964, in the Bronx, a high school teacher is fatally shot in the back with an arrow. A man offers two seemingly intoxicated young women to two teenage boys, even offering cash to take the women off his hands. Later, these women awaken in an unfamiliar apartment, nude beneath the sheets. The following day, the boys inform the girls of their teacher's murder, explaining why they were available to take them on the car ride.

Heinz, recently released from prison after serving time for attempted rape, returns to his old neighborhood to reunite with his ailing mother and to reignite his twisted relationship with Linda, his near-rape victim. Harry, who had previously protected Linda during the near-assault, has since adopted a non-violent stance in response to violence, influenced by the murder of his policeman father and the non-violent protests against racism advocated by Dr. Martin Luther King. Having embraced Buddhism and pacifism, Harry seeks to join Dr. King's movement, complicating his task of protecting Linda once again.

Heinz summons Linda to meet him in a park at midnight, and though hesitant, she complies, fearing his potential for danger. Arriving at the rendezvous, Linda finds a board for defense and conceals it. Heinz presents her with a gift - two stolen penguins from the Bronx Zoo. However, she informs him that he must return them as penguins require special care. Enraged by what he perceives as rejection, Heinz kills one of the penguins. In the ensuing struggle, Linda manages to fend him off and escapes with one of the penguins.

Subsequently, Heinz takes an unconscious Linda to a rooftop, where police secure the building. A sharpshooter has a clear shot at Heinz but refrains from firing, fearing for Linda's safety. Ultimately, Heinz meets his demise from a mysterious arrow to his back.

== Cast ==
- Jodie Foster as Linda
- Tim Robbins as Harry
- Todd Graff as Jamie
- John Turturro as Heinz
- Michael R. Howard as Murray
- Pierre Epstein as George
- Jery Hewitt as Mr. Glasgow
- Rodney Harvey as Castro
- Daniel Jenkins as Willie
- Elizabeth Berridge as Melanie
- Carl Capotorto as Sal
- Eriq La Salle as Samuel Kemp
- Mike Starr as Bartender
- Bill Cobbs as Man in Coffee Shop
- Campbell Scott as Policeman

== Production ==
Tony Bill was impressed by the writing of John Patrick Shanley after an actor auditioned for Bill using Shanley's Danny and the Deep Blue Sea. Bill contacted the author and asked if he had any screenplays. Shanley wrote Five Corners which Bill immediately optioned. Bill said "It's fresh, it's special, it's new, it's not like other movies. That's what I look for."

Finance came from Britain's Handmade Films. It was their first American film. "I never shopped it around," said Bill. "I think I can accurately predict when a movie isn't the kind that studios are looking for. It was too special, too unique, not high concept enough. It didn't have a star-of-the-month in it. It's an ensemble picture which they steer away from."

Bill says that Handmade were "hands off' all through the process although they had comments on the edit.

According to Bill, said there was reluctance to cast Jodie Foster, in part due to fears she was overweight, but he prevailed. The director said the parallels between the story - where Foster played a woman tormented by a troubled man - and Jodie Foster's experience with John Hinckley "never occurred to either of us [he or Foster] until people started asking us about it."

Foster called it "a very weird and artsy script... and Tony Bill was the right director for it because he could strip it down to its simplest level and make it accessible."

Filming took nine weeks in late 1986 on location in New York. "It's a topical look at the onslaught of violence and anarchy in our society," said Bill.

== Reception ==
The Los Angeles Times wrote "at its best, the weird little Bronx western moral fable has electric sass, unfazed morality and sweet, tough jolts."

== See also ==
- List of crime films

== Notes ==
- Gallagher, John (1989). Film directors on directing. Praeger.
