= Caprice Benedetti =

American actress

- Born: August 1, 1965 (age 61)
- Occupation: Actress
- Years active: 1993–present

Caprice Stella Benedetti (born August 1, 1965) is an American actress. She is best known for her role in the 2000 science fiction movie Timequest in which she played Jacqueline Kennedy. She also appeared as Maria Owens, the matriarch of the Owens clan, in the 1998 romantic fantasy film Practical Magic.

== Life and career ==
Caprice played a brief supporting role in Charmed as the Angel of Light Guardian of the Hollow in the Season 4 episode "Charmed and Dangerous", and appeared in Slow Burn.

== Filmography ==
Film roles
Year	Title	Role	Notes
1993	Italian Movie	Anna	
1996	Lowball	Bridgette	
1997	Chapter Perfect	Reynolds Dey	
1997	The Devil's Advocate	Menage A Trois Woman	
1997	Sleeping Together	Suzanne	
1998	Practical Magic	Maria Owens	
2000	Shaft	Karen	
2000	Slow Burn	Catalina McTeague	
2000	Timequest	Jacqueline Kennedy	
2001	Double Whammy	Shelley	
2005	Hitch	Gorgeous Wife	
2005	One Last Thing...	Designer	
2006	A New Wave	Cynthia DeWitt	
2006	The Immaculate Misconception	Delores	
2016	Split	Patricia	
2016	Our Time	Aunt Camella	
2017	The Unattainable Story	Annette	
2017	Most Beautiful Island	Vanessa	
TBA	Liquid Red	The Movie Star	
Television roles
Year	Title	Role	Notes
1996	Them	Sally Trent	Television film
1996, 2002	Law & Order	Alexandra Shabtai / Amber	Episodes: "Atonement" (1996), "Oxymoron" (2002)
1998	Legacy	N/A	Episode: "Homecoming"
1999	The Norm Show	Becky	Episode: "While You Weren't Sleeping"
1999	The Hunley	Dixon's Wife	Television film
2001	Deadline	Valerie Dunne	Episode: "Red Herring"
2001, 2007	Law & Order: Criminal Intent	Leslie Mercer / Irene	Episodes: "Enemy Within" (2001), "Privilege" (2007)
2001	JAG	Gina Belotti	Episode: "To Walk on Wings"
2002	Sex and the City	Judith McBain	Episode: "Change of a Dress"
2002	Charmed	Angel Guardian	Episode: "Charmed and Dangerous"
2002, 2016	Law & Order: Special Victims Unit	Tammy Ledder / Amanda Curry	Episodes: "Disappearing Acts" (2002), "Assaulting Reality" (2016)
2005	Rescue Me	Receptionist	Episodes: "Reunion", "Brains"
2006	Exposing the Order of the Serpentine	Lunch Lady	Television film
2007	All My Children	Milla	Episodes: "Episode #1.9644", "Episode #1.9645"
2008	Brotherhood	Molly	4 episodes
2009	The Good Wife	Arianna Avarski	Episode: "Stripped"
2012	Gossip Girl	Lucia Gallo	Episode: "Raiders of the Lost Art"
2015	Unfiltered	Janice Wiley	
2017	Blacklist	Analia Beneventi	Episode: "Greyson Blaise (No. 37)"
