= Chris Mulkey =

American film and television actor (born 1948)

- Born: Christian Mulkey; May 3, 1948 (age 78); Viroqua, Wisconsin, U.S.
- Occupation: Actor
- Years active: 1975-present
- Website: chrismulkeymusic.com

Chris Mulkey (born May 3, 1948) is an American film and television actor and blues and Americana singer-songwriter.

== Career ==
Mulkey played the supporting role of husband to Annie Potts's character in Any Day Now from 1998 to 2002. He has also appeared in Captain Phillips, Against the Wall, Cloverfield, the NBC TV movie Knight Rider, 24, Boardwalk Empire, Friday Night Lights, Boomtown, Justified, Baretta, and Twin Peaks.

He played the main character in the controversial 1985 Supertramp music video "Brother Where You Bound". He appeared in the Wing Commander franchise as Jacob "Hawk" Manley. He costarred with John Jenkins and Karen Landry in the 1988 indie film Patti Rocks. He appeared in the science fiction action film The Hidden, and the 1989 sci-fi cop film K-9000. He has appeared in more recent films as The Purge, Slow Burn, Sanitarium, The Identical and On the Basis of Sex. In 2014, he had a cameo role in Whiplash.

He has a southern blues band called Chris Mulkey and Blue Highway.

== Filmography ==
Film

Year	Title	Role	Notes
1975	Loose Ends	Billy Regis	
1977	Tomcats	Cullen Garrett	
1978	The Boss' Son	Fred	
1979	Sunnyside	Reggie Flynn	
1980	The Long Riders	Vernon Biggs	
1981	All Night Long	Russell Monk	
1982	First Blood	Deputy Ward	
1982	48 Hrs.	Second Cop	
1982	Timerider: The Adventure of Lyle Swann	Daniels	
1984	Dreamscape	Gary Finch	
1984	Runaway	David Johnson	
1986	Quiet Cool	"Red"	
1987	The Hidden	Jack DeVries	
1988	Patti Rocks	Billy Regis	
1988	Under the Gun	Larry	
1988	Jack's Back	Scott Morofsky	
1988	In Dangerous Company	Chris	
1988	Heartbreak Hotel	Steve Ayres	
1988	From Hollywood to Deadwood	Nick Detroit	
1989	Vietnam War Story: The Last Days	Griffin	Segment: "Dirty Work"
1990	Denial	Chad	
1991	Ambition	Man In Bookstore	
1992	Gas Food Lodging	Raymond	
1992	The Silencer	George	
1993	Bound and Gagged: A Love Story	Steve	
1993	Ghost in the Machine	Bram Walker	
1995	Dead Cold	Eric	
1996	Broken Arrow	Major Hunt	
1996	The Fan	Tim	
1996	Foxfire	Dan Goldman	
1996	Amanda	Caleb Farnsworth	
1996	Full Moon Rising	Dirk Jaspers	
1997	Behind Enemy Lines	CIA Agent "Jonesy" Jones	
1997	Sub Down	Commander Kirsch	
1997	Weapons of Mass Distraction	Jerry Pascoe	
1998	Bulworth	Cop #2	
1998	Twist of Fate	Lennox	
1999	Sugar Town	Aaron	
1999	Requiem for Murder	Richard Poe	
1999	Jimmy Zip	Rick Conesco	
2000	Slow Burn	Jacob McTeague	
2002	American Girl	John Grubb	
2003	Manhood	Travel Agent	
2003	Radio	Frank Clay	
2004	Mysterious Skin	George Lackey	
2005	North Country	Earl Slangley	
2005	Dirty	Carlson	
2006	Dreamland	Herb	
2006	Wasted	Father Collins	
2006	Love & Debate	Austin	
2006	Little Chenier	Sheriff Kline LeBauve	
2006	The Curiosity of Chance	Sir	
2006	Unknown	Detective James Curtis	
2006	One Night with You	Detective Brown	
2007	Nanking	Mills McCallum	
2007	I Tried	Strank	
2007	D-War	Agent Frank Pinsky	
2007	Universal Groove	The Agent	
2008	Cloverfield	Lieutenant Colonel Graff	
2008	Older than America	Paul Gunderson	
2008	Dead*Line	Hollis	Short film
2008	Shattered!	Dennis	
2009	The Perfect Game	"Lucky" Haskins	
2009	Dark Moon Rising	John	
2011	COLLAPSE	Robert	
2011	Bad Actress	Bernie Pillage	
2011	The Levenger Tapes	Stackman	
2012	Any Day Now	District Attorney Wilson	
2012	Knife Fight	Roger Fillmore	
2013	Sanitarium	Father	Segment: "Monsters are Real"
2013	Decoding Annie Parker	Ralph Parker	
2013	The Purge	Mr. Halverson	
2013	Captain Phillips	John Cronan	
2014	The Jersey Devil	God	
2014	Whiplash	Frank Neiman	
2014	The Identical	William Hemsley (Older)	
2014	Last Weekend	Malcolm Green	
2014	The Living	Howard	
2014	The Surface	Kelly	
2015	Truth	Maurice Udell	
2015	Car Dogs	Malcolm Chamberlain	
2015	Call Me King	Angelo	
2016	Message from the King	Frank Leary	
2016	Wolves at the Door	John	
2017	Mad Families	Tommy	
2018	When I Sing	"Rock Doc"	
2018	Gotti	Frank DeCicco	
2018	Ouija House	Tomas	
2018	Gloria Bell	Charlie	
2018	The Standoff at Sparrow Creek	Ford	
2018	Spare Room	Mac	
2018	On the Basis of Sex	Charles Moritz	
2019	Above Suspicion	Todd Eason	
2019	Rogue Warfare 2: The Hunt	Commander Brisco	
2020	Emerald Run	Alfio Sarda	
2020	How to Deter a Robber	Andy Reynolds	
2020	Killing Eleanor	Edward Grillo	
2023	Mother, May I?	Bill	
2025	Long Shadows	Roy Holt	
2026	The Remedy	Uncle Joe	

=== Television ===
Year	Title	Role	Notes
1977, 1978	Baretta	Dealer / Joshua	2 episodes
1978	M*A*S*H	Soldier	Episode: "Tea and Empathy"
1978	Barnaby Jones	Curt Davis	Episode: "Terror on a Quiet Afternoon"
1979	Eight Is Enough	The Swindler	Episode: "The Yearning Point"
1979	Time Express	Danny White	Episode: "Rodeo/Cop"
1979	Charlie's Angels	Reggie Martin	Episode: "Angels on Skates"
1980	A Rumor of War	Radio Man	2 episodes
1980	The Waltons	Roller	Episode: "The Prodigals"
1980	The White Shadow	Ilya	Episode: "The Russians Are Coming"
1980	Here's Boomer	"Sticks"	Episode: "Jailbreak"
1980	Act of Love	Nurse Watkins	Television film
1981	CHiPs	Dave	Episode: "Forty Tons of Trouble"
1981	The Killing of Randy Webster	Sonny Manse	Television film
1981	Private Benjamin	Glickman	Episode: "Jungle Swamp Survival"
1982	Dangerous Company	Jeremy Blake	Television film
1982	T. J. Hooker	Blaine Thomas	Episode: "The Survival Syndrome"
1983, 1985	The Dukes of Hazzard	Sharp / Billy Ray	2 episodes
1985	Remington Steele	Rhodes	Episode: "Steele Blushing"
1985	Magnum, P.I.	Tony, The "Repo Man"	Episode: "Blood and Honor"
1987	The Twilight Zone	Ray Dobson	Episode: "The Junction"
1987	It's Garry Shandling's Show	Sylvia's Ex-Boyfriend	Episode: "Dial L for Laundry"
1987	Deadly Care	Richard Halloran	Television film
1987	Matlock	"Bones" Jennings	Episode: "The Country Boy"
1987	Beauty and the Beast	Danny Yates	Episode: "An Impossible Silence"
1987	The Man Who Broke 1,000 Chains	Burn's Chicago Lawyer	Television film
1988	Tricks of the Trade	Lieutenant Stryker	Television film
1989	A Peaceable Kingdom	Max Hall	Episode: "Kitty Paws"
1990	Hometown Boy Makes Good	Al Swearinger	Television film
1990	Rainbow Drive	Ira Rosenberg	Television film
1990	Angel of Death	Matt Hendricks	Television film
1990–1991	Twin Peaks	Hank Jennings	13 episodes
1990, 1994	Murder, She Wrote	Al Wallace / Joey Freeman	Television film
1991	Thirtysomething	George	Episode: "The Difference Between Men and Women"
1991	K-9000	Eddie Monroe	Television film
1991	Runaway Father	Richard	Television film
1992	Civil Wars	Richard Foley	Episode: "Honi Soit Qui Mal Y Pense"
1992	Arresting Behavior	Officer Pete Walsh	5 episodes
1992	Drug Wars: The Cocaine Cartel	Charlie White	Television film
1992	Deadbolt	Jordan	Television film
1993	The Switch	Bill	Television film
1993–1994	Bakersfield P.D.	Bill	17 episodes
1994	Grace Under Fire	Kurt Ross	Episode: "Pitch and Woo"
1995	Blossom	Dan	Episode: "It Happened One Night"
1995	Texas Justice	Lanny Shelton	Television film
1997	Walker, Texas Ranger	Foreman Cox	Episode: "A Woman's Place"
1998	Touched by an Angel	Erskine Hughes	Episode: "Doodlebugs"
1998	Michael Hayes	Becker	Episode: "Imagine"
1998	The Cowboy and the Movie Star	Sheriff	Television film; uncredited
1998	The Outer Limits	Mike	Episode: "Black Box"
1998–2002	Any Day Now	Colliar Sims	83 episodes
1999–2000	Batman Beyond	Shriek / Walter Shreeve (voice)	3 episodes
2002	Boomtown	Kevin Van Horn	Episode: "Reelin' in the Years"
2003	CSI: Miami	Leonard Murphy	Episode: "Forced Entry"
2003	JAG	Major Phelps	Episode: "The Boast"
2003, 2011	CSI: Crime Scene Investigation	Maurice Gallows / Mr. Young	2 episodes
2004	Touching Evil	Martin Akins	Episode: "Love Lies Bleeding"
2006	Broken Trail	Ed "Big Ears" Bywaters	Miniseries
2006	Lost	Mike	Episode: "Further Instructions"
2006	Sleeper Cell	Bob	2 episodes
2007	Cold Case	Pat Hall	Episode: "Shuffle, Ball Change"
2007	Smith	Donny	Episode: "Four"
2007	Friday Night Lights	Coach Bill McGregor	4 episodes
2007–2010	Saving Grace	Doug Norman	9 episodes
2008	Knight Rider	Sheriff Ramsey	Episode: "Knight Rider"
2008	Criminal Minds	Sheriff Britt Hallum	Episode: "Elephant's Memory"
2008	A Teacher's Crime	Bill Rander	Television film
2008	Shark	Sheriff Griffin	Episode: "Wayne's World 3: Killer Shark"
2008	NCIS	Captain Richard Owens	Episode: "Agent Afloat"
2008	CSI: NY	Bernie Benton	Episode: "The Triangle"
2009	24	Doug Knowles	2 episodes
2009	In Plain Sight	Karl Hogeland	Episode: "Duplicate Bridge"
2009	Law & Order	Judge Robert Maxen	Episode: "Just a Girl in the World"
2010	Human Target	Detective Al Jenkins	Episode: "Run"
2010	Outlaw	Detective Hank Darby	Episode: "In Re: Tracy Vidalin"
2010	Castle	Wilbur Pittorino	Episode: "Last Call"
2010–2011	Boardwalk Empire	Boss Frank Hague	4 episodes
2011	Justified	Walt McCready	2 episodes
2011	The Glades	Frank Morgan	Episode: "Lost and Found"
2012	Femme Fatales	Bendix Darby	Episode: "Trophy Wife"
2012	Franklin & Bash	Captain N. Goepp	Episode: "Summer Girls"
2013	The Mentalist	Tom Crayhew	Episode: "The Red Barn"
2014	Grimm	Bart	3 episodes
2014	Halt and Catch Fire	Gary	Episode: "Adventure"
2014	Legends	Adviser to The President	Episode: "Betrayal"
2014	Scorpion	Ronny	Episode: "Shorthanded"
2015	Scandal	Chief Conners	Episode: "The Lawn Chair"
2015	Battle Creek	Henry Briggs	Episode: "Mama's Boy"
2015	The Spoils Before Dying	Ed Nestly	3 episodes
2015	Impastor	Roger Kerry	Episode: "Honor Thy Boyfriend's Father and Mother"
2016	CSI: Cyber	Mayor Cavanaugh	Episode: "Going Viral"
2016	Agent Carter	Uncle Bud Schultz	Episode: "Smoke & Mirrors"
2016	Rush Hour	Elliot Vaughn	Episode: "Prisoner of Love"
2016	Timeless	Frank Hamer	Episode: "Last Ride of Bonnie & Clyde"
2017	Chicago Justice	Mr. Nichols	Episode: "Friendly Fire"
2017	Better Call Saul	Billy Gatwood	Episode: "Fall"
2018	Lucifer	Gil	Episode: "City of Angels?"
2018	Liberty Crossing	Terry Szymanski	7 episodes
2018	Disillusioned	Vincent	Television film
2018	Hawaii Five-0	Pettifer	Episode: "Pua a'e la ka uwahi o ka moe"
2019	Animal Kingdom	Jed	2 episodes
2019	Briarpatch	Calvin Strucker	Episode: "First Time in Saint Disgrace"
2019	Castle Rock	Clay	5 episodes
2021	Kaljave Gume	Robert Enright	10 episodes
2021	Mr. Corman	Frank (voice)	Episode: "Funeral"
2026	Marshals	Tom Weaver	5 episodes
