= Audie Award for Audio Drama =

Audie award for achievement in audiobook dramatization

- Description: Excellence in performance, production, and content for an audio drama
- Country: United States
- Presented by: Audio Publishers Association (APA)
- Website: www.audiopub.org

The Audie Award for Title is one of the Audie Awards presented annually by the Audio Publishers Association (APA). It awards excellence in performance, production, and content for an audiodrama released in a given year. Originally the award was given as the Audie Award for Theatrical Production in 1999; in 2000 and 2001 the award was given as the Audie Award for Theatrical Performance. The award was not given in 2002.

== Winners and finalists ==
=== 1990s ===
Year	Title	Author	Narrator(s)	Publisher	Result	Ref.
1999 4th	The Road to Mecca (1984)	Athol Fugard	Julie Harris, Amy Irving, and Harris Yulin	L.A. Theatre Works	Winner	
1999 4th	A Little Princess (1999)	Frances Hodgson Burnett (adapted by John Vreeke)	Full cast	NYS Theatre Institute/Family Classic Audio Books	Finalist	
1999 4th	All My Sons (1946)	Arthur Miller	Julie Harris, James Farentino, and Arye Gross	L.A. Theatre Works	Finalist	

=== 2000s ===
Year	Title	Author	Narrator(s)	Publisher	Result	Ref.
2000 5th	A Prairie Home Companion: 25th Anniversary (1999)	Garrison Keillor	Garrison Keillor	HighBridge Audio	Winner	
2000 5th	A Fair Country (1996)	Jon Robin Baitz	Judith Ivey, David Dukes, Kurt Deutsch, and Matt McGrath	L.A. Theatre Works	Finalist	
2000 5th	Pretty Fire (1995)	Charlayne Woodard	Charlayne Woodard	L.A. Theatre Works	Finalist	
2001 6th	Agnes of God (1979)	John Pielmeier	Barbara Bain, Emily Bergl, and Harriet Harris	L.A. Theatre Works	Winner	
2001 6th	Neat (2000)	Charlayne Woodard	Charlayne Woodard	L.A. Theatre Works	Finalist	
2001 6th	Table Manners (1973)	Alan Ayckbourn	Rosalind Ayres, Ken Danziger, Martin Jarvis, Jane Leeves, Christopher Neame, and Carolyn Seymour	L.A. Theatre Works	Finalist	
2002 7th	No award presented					
2003 8th	The Guys (2002)	Anne Nelson	Swoosie Kurtz and Bill Irwin	Random House Audio	Winner	
2003 8th	Billy Budd, Sailor (1924; written 1892)	Herman Melville (Dramatized by Philip Glassborow and Paul McCusker)	Full cast	Focus on the Family	Finalist	
2003 8th	Hedda Gabler (1891)	Henrik Ibsen	Juliet Stevenson, Michael Maloney, Philip Voss, Emma Fielding, and full cast	Naxos Audiobooks	Finalist	
2003 8th	King Lear (1606)	William Shakespeare	Paul Scofield, Alec McCowen, Kenneth Branagh, and full cast	Naxos Audiobooks	Finalist	
2003 8th	The Silver Chair (1953)	C. S. Lewis (dramatized by Paul McCusker)	Full cast	Focus on the Family	Finalist	
2004 9th	The Complete Arkangel Shakespeare (2003)	William Shakespeare	Full cast	The Audio Partners	Winner	
2004 9th	The Chronicles of Narnia (1950–1956)	C. S. Lewis (dramatized by Paul McCusker)	Full cast	Focus on the Family	Finalist	
2004 9th	At Home in Mitford (1996)	Jan Karon (dramatized by Paul McCusker)	Full cast	Tyndale Audio	Finalist	
2004 9th	Father Gilbert Mysteries (Series 2) (2004)	Paul McCusker	Full cast	Focus on the Family	Finalist	
2004 9th	On the Waterfront (1954)	Budd Schulberg	Full cast	L.A. Theatre Works	Finalist	
2005 10th	Buddha Boy (2003)	Kathe Koja	Spencer Murphy and the Full Cast Family	Full Cast Audio	Winner	
2005 10th	Anne of Green Gables (1908)	L. M. Montgomery (dramatized by Chris Fabry)	Full cast	Tyndale Audio	Finalist	
2005 10th	Going to St. Ives (1996)	Lee Blessing	L. Scott Caldwell and Caroline Goodall	L.A. Theatre Works	Finalist	
2005 10th	The Handmaid's Tale (1985)	Margaret Atwood (adapted by Michael O'Brien)	Michael O'Brien	BTC Audiobooks/Goose Lane Editions	Finalist	
2005 10th	The Stone Angel (1964)	Margaret Laurence (adapted by James W. Nichol)	James W. Nichol	BTC Audiobooks/Goose Lane Editions	Finalist	
2006 11th	The Sherlock Holmes Theatre (2005)	Arthur Conan Doyle (adapted by Arthur Conan Doyle, William Gillette and Yuri Rasovsky)	Martin Jarvis, Kristoffer Tabori, and full cast	Blackstone Audio	Winner	
2006 11th	At the Back of the North Wind (1871)	George MacDonald (adapted by Murray Watts and Philip Glassborow)	Full cast	Tyndale House	Finalist	
2006 11th	The Blind Assassin (2000)	Margaret Atwood (adapted by Michael O'Brien)	Full cast	BTC Audiobooks/Goose Lane Editions	Finalist	
2006 11th	Frozen (1998)	Bryony Lavery	Rosalind Ayres, Jeffrey Donovan, and Laila Robins	L.A. Theatre Works	Finalist	
2006 11th	The Hiding Place (1971)	Corrie ten Boom (dramatized by Dave Arnold)	Full cast	Tyndale House	Finalist	
2007 12th	The Life of Jesus: Dramatic Eyewitness Accounts from the Luke Reports (2006)	Paul McCusker	Full cast	Tyndale/Focus on the Family	Winner	
2007 12th	Airborn (2004)	Kenneth Oppel	David Kelly and full cast	Full Cast Audio	Finalist	
2007 12th	Kong: King of Skull Island (2004)	Joe DeVito and Brad Strickland	David Baker and full cast	Full Cast Audio	Finalist	
2007 12th	Nightmares on Congress Street (Part V) (2006)	Fitz-James O'Brien, Edgar Allan Poe, Alex Irvine, Michael Duffy, Ray Bradbury, Hugh B. Cave, and H. P. Lovecraft	Full cast	Tantor Media	Finalist	
2007 12th	The Picture of Dorian Gray (1891)	Oscar Wilde (dramatized by Nick McCarty)	Jamie Glover and full cast	BBC Audiobooks America	Finalist	
2008 13th	Sweeney Todd and the String of Pearls (2007)	Yuri Rasovsky	Phil Proctor, Simon Templeman, Moira Quirk, Martin Jarvis, Rosalind Ayres, Robertson Dean, and W. Morgan Sheppard	Blackstone Audio	Winner	
2008 13th	Princess Academy (2005)	Shannon Hale	Laura Credidio	Full Cast Audio	Finalist	
2008 13th	Radio Theatre: Amazing Grace (2007)	Paul McCusker and Dave Arnold	Robert Lindsay, David Oyelowo, Chris Larkin, Donald Sinden, Martin Jarvis, Laura-Michelle Kelly, and full cast	Focus on the Family/Tyndale House	Finalist	
2008 13th	The Star Beast (1954)	Robert A. Heinlein	David Baker	Full Cast Audio	Finalist	
2008 13th	Vienna Prelude (2000)	Bodie Thoene	Sean Barrett	Family Audio Library	Finalist	
2009 14th	The Odyssey (8th or 9th century B.C.)	Homer (dramatized by Simon Armitage)	Tim McInnerny, Amanda Redman, and full cast	BBC Audiobooks America	Winner	
2009 14th	Jack's Last Call (2008)	Patrick Fenton	Len Cariou and full cast	SueMedia Productions	Finalist	
2009 14th	Secret Order (2008)	Bob Clyman	George Segal, Will McCormack, Angela Goethals, and Richard Schiff	L.A. Theatre Works	Finalist	
2009 14th	Sun Moon Stars Rain (2006)	Jan Cheripko	Spencer Murphy	Full Cast Audio	Finalist	
2009 14th	Tales from the Perilous Realm	J. R. R. Tolkien (adapted by Brian Sibley)	Michael Hordern and full cast	BBC Audiobooks America	Finalist	

=== 2010s ===
Year	Title	Author	Narrator(s)	Publisher	Result	Ref.
2010 15th	The Word of Promise (1982)	Carl Amari (producer)	Michael York, Richard Dreyfuss, Gary Sinise, and full cast	Thomas Nelson	Winner	
2010 15th	Focus on the Family Radio Theatre: C. S. Lewis' The Screwtape Letters (1942)	C. S. Lewis (adapted by Paul McCusker)	Andy Serkis and full cast	Tyndale Audio	Finalist	
2010 15th	Little Dorrit (1857)	Charles Dickens (dramatized by Doug Lucie)	Full cast	BBC Audiobooks America	Finalist	
2010 15th	The Maltese Falcon (1930)	Dashiell Hammett (dramatized by Yuri Rasovsky)	Michael Madsen, Sandra Oh, and Edward Herrmann	Blackstone Audio	Finalist	
2010 15th	The Rivalry (1959)	Norman Corwin	Paul Giamatti, James Gleason, Lily Rabe, David Strathairn, and Shannon Cochran	L.A. Theatre Works	Finalist	
2011 16th	Saint Joan (1923)	George Bernard Shaw	Amy Irving, Edward Herrmann, Kristoffer Tabori, and full cast	Blackstone Audio	Winner	
2011 16th	'Art' (1994)	Yasmina Reza	Bob Balaban, Brian Cox, and Jeff Perry	L.A. Theatre Works	Finalist	
2011 16th	The Importance of Being Earnest (1895)	Oscar Wilde	Emily Bergl, Charles Busch, Neil Dickson, Jill Gascoine, James Marsters, Christopher Neame, and Matthew Wolf	L.A. Theatre Works	Finalist	
2011 16th	The Sunset Limited (2006)	Cormac McCarthy	Austin Pendleton, Ezra Knight, and Tom Stechschulte	Recorded Books	Finalist	
2011 16th	Vengeance (2008)	A. J. Scudiere	Kristoffer Tabori, Stephanie Zimbalist, and Don Leslie	Griffyn Ink	Finalist	
2012 17th	The Arthur Miller Collection (1944–1994)	Arthur Miller	Full cast	L.A. Theatre Works	Winner	
2012 17th	The Graduate (1967)	Charles Webb, Terry Johnson, and Calder Willingham (adapted by Buck Henry)	Kathleen Turner, Matthew Rhys, and full cast	L.A. Theatre Works	Finalist	
2012 17th	The Mark of Zorro (1919)	Johnston McCulley (adapted by Yuri Rasovsky)	Val Kilmer and full cast	Blackstone Audio	Finalist	
2012 17th	We're Alive	Kc Wayland	Full cast	Blackstone Audio	Finalist	
2013 18th	Swordspoint (1989)	Ellen Kushner	Ellen Kushner, Dion Graham, Katherine Kellgren, Robert Fass, Nick Sullivan, Simon Jones, Sam Guncler, and Anne Bobby	SueMedia Productions (for Neil Gaiman Presents/ACX)	Winner	
2013 18th	Die, Snow White! Die, Damn You! (2012)	Yuri Rasovsky	Sandra Oh, Simon Helberg, Kate Burton, and full cast	Blackstone Audio	Finalist	
2013 18th	I, Claudius (2010)	Robert Graves (adapted by Robin Brooks)	Derek Jacobi, Tom Goodman-Hill, and full cast	AudioGO	Finalist	
2013 18th	The Star Angel (2012)	Jerry Robbins	Jerry Robbins and the Colonial Radio Players	Brilliance Audio	Finalist	
2013 18th	Titanium Rain (Series 1) (2008)	Josh Finney and Kat Rocha	Lance Roger Axt, Elizabeth Knowelden, Carrington Macduffie, and full cast	The Audiocomics Company	Finalist	
2013 18th	Trouble on His Wings (1939)	L. Ron Hubbard	Jennifer Aspen, Bob Caso, R. F. Daley, Jim Meskimen, and Matt Scott	Galaxy Press	Finalist	
2014 19th	Oliver Twist (1838)	Charles Dickens (adapted by Paul McCusker)	Joe Holgate, Henry Goodman, Lee Boardman, Geoffrey Palmer, Roy Hudd, Finty Williams, and a full cast	Tyndale Audio	Winner	
2014 19th	The Fall of the Kings (2002)	Ellen Kushner and Delia Sherman	Ellen Kushner et al.	SueMedia Productions (for Neil Gaiman Presents/Audible)	Finalist	
2014 19th	Hollywood Said No! (2013)	Bob Odenkirk and David Cross	Bob Odenkirk, David Cross, and full cast	Hachette Audio	Finalist	
2014 19th	Marvel Civil War (2012)	Stuart Moore	Richard Rohan, Richard Cutting, Tim Getman, James Keegan, Kimberly Gilbert, and full cast	GraphicAudio	Finalist	
2014 19th	Screaming with the Cannibals (2003)	Lee Maynard	Ross Ballard II	Mountain Whispers Audiobooks	Finalist	
2014 19th	The War of the Worlds (1897)	H. G. Wells (adapted by M. J. Elliott)	Colonial Radio Players	Colonial Radio Theatre on the Air	Finalist	
2015 20th	The Hound of the Baskervilles (1902)	Arthur Conan Doyle (adapted by David Pichette and R. Hamilton Wright)	Geoffrey Arend, Wilson Bethel, Seamus Dever, Sarah Drew, Henri Lubatti, James Marsters, Christopher Neame, Moira Quirk, and Darren Richardson	L.A. Theatre Works	Winner	
2015 20th	Anne Manx and the Blood Chase (2014)	Larry Weiner	Claudia Christian, Moira Kelly, Patricia Tallman, and a full cast	Radio Repertory Company of America	Finalist	
2015 20th	Mistborn: The Final Empire (2006)	Brandon Sanderson	Terence Aselford, Kimberly Gilbert, David Jourdan, and full cast	GraphicAudio	Finalist	
2015 20th	Swords of Riverside (2014)	Ellen Kushner and Delia Sherman	Ellen Kushner, Barbara Rosenblat, Katherine Kellgren, Dion Graham, Simon Jones, et al.	SueMedia Productions (for Neil Gaiman/ACX)	Finalist	
2015 20th	Under Drake's Flag (1883)	G. A. Henty (adapted by John Fornof)	Brian Blessed	Heirloom Audio Productions	Finalist	
2016 21st	The Jungle Book: The Mowgli Stories (1894)	Rudyard Kipling (adapted by Bev Doyle and Richard Kurti)	Bill Bailey, Richard E. Grant, Colin Salmon, Tim McInnerny, Bernard Cribbins, Celia Imrie, and Martin Shaw	Audible	Winner	
2016 21st	Amok (2007)	Sebastian Fitzek	Full cast	Audible Studios	Finalist	
2016 21st	Christmas Eve, 1914 (2014)	Charles Olivier	Full cast	Audible Studios	Finalist	
2016 21st	The Sleeper and the Spindle (2013)	Neil Gaiman	Julian Rhind-Tutt, Lara Pulver, Niamh Walsh, Adjoa Andoh, Peter Forbes, John Sessions, and Michael Maloney	HarperAudio	Finalist	
2016 21st	The Starling Project (2014)	Jeffery Deaver	Alfred Molina and full cast	Audible	Finalist	
2017 22nd	In the Embers (2015)	Brian Priceand Jerry Stearns	Robin Miles, Edwin Strout, Dean Johnson, Jacquie Maddix, and full cast	Great Northern Audio Theatre/Blackstone Audio	Winner	
2017 22nd	Alien: Out of the Shadows (2014)	Tim Lebbon (adapted by Dirk Maggs)	Rutger Hauer, Corey Johnson, Matthew Lewis, Kathryn Drysdale, Laurel Lefkow, Andrea Deck, and Mac McDonald	Audible	Finalist	
2017 22nd	"Death and the Queen", Doctor Who: The Tenth Doctor Adventures (2016)	James Goss	David Tennant, Catherine Tate, Alice Krige, Blake Ritson, Beth Chalmers, and Alan Cox	Big Finish Productions	Finalist	
2017 22nd	"Only the Monstrous", Doctor Who: The War Doctor (2015)	Nicholas Briggs	John Hurt, Jacqueline Pearce, Carolyn Seymour, and Lucy Briggs-Owen	Big Finish Productions	Finalist	
2017 22nd	The Mountaintop (2009)	Katori Hall	Aja Naomi King and Larry Powell	L.A. Theatre Works	Finalist	
2018 23rd	Brother Francis: The Barefoot Saint of Assisi (2016)	Paul McCusker	Joseph Timms, Owen Teale, Geoffrey Palmer, and full cast	Augustine Institute	Winner	
2018 23rd	Cicero (2018)	David Llewellyn	Samuel Barnett and George Naylor	Big Finish Productions	Finalist	
2018 23rd	The Mean (2017)	John Arthur Long	John Arthur Long	Blackstone Publishing	Finalist	
2018 23rd	Treasure Island (1882)	Robert Louis Stevenson (adapted by Marty Ross)	Philip Glenister, Daniel Mays, Catherine Tate, Owen Teale, and Gerran Howell	Audible Studios	Finalist	
2018 23rd	The Tug of War (2017)	David Rambo	Matthew Arkin, Hugo Armstrong, Seamus Dever, Matthew Floyd Miller, James Morrison, David Selby, Rich Sommer, Josh Stamberg, Nick Toren, John Vickery, and Jules Willcox	L.A. Theatre Works	Finalist	
2019 24th	The Martian Invasion of Earth (1897)	H. G. Wells (adapted by Nicholas Briggs)	Richard Armitage and Lucy Briggs-Owen	Big Finish Productions	Winner	
2019 24th	Alien: Sea of Sorrows (2014)	James A. Moore (adapted by Dirk Maggs)	John Chancer, Stockard Channing, Tony Gardner, Lorelei King, Laurel Lefkow, and full cast	Audible Studios	Finalist	
2019 24th	Disgraced (2012)	Ayad Akhtar	Geoffrey Arend, Behzad Dabu, Hari Dhillon, Sameerah Luqmaan-Harris, and Emily Swallow	L.A. Theatre Works	Finalist	
2019 24th	Emma (1815)	Jane Austen (adapted by Anna Lea)	Emma Thompson, Isabella Inchbald, Joanne Froggatt, Joseph Millson, Morgana Robinson, and full cast	Audible Studios	Finalist	
2019 24th	Girls & Boys (2018)	Dennis Kelly	Carey Mulligan	Audible	Finalist	
2019 24th	Steal the Stars (2018)	Mac Rogers	Full cast	Macmillan Audio	Finalist	

=== 2020s ===
Year	Title	Author	Narrator(s)	Publisher	Result	Ref.
2020 25th	Angels in America: A Gay Fantasia on National Themes	Tony Kushner	Andrew Garfield, Nathan Lane, Susan Brown, Denise Gough, and full cast	Penguin Random House Audio	Winner	
2020 25th	The Absolute Brightness of Leonard Pelkey (2015)	James Lecesne	James Lecesne	Audible Originals	Finalist	
2020 25th	Birthday Suit (2019)	Lauren Blakely	Andi Arndt, Sebastian York, January LaVoy, Julia Whelan, R. C. Bray, Shane East, Joe Arden, Erin Mallon, Dion Graham, Savannah Peachwood, Jason Clarke, and Robin Miles	Lauren Blakely Books	Finalist	
2020 25th	Have a Nice Day (2018)	Billy Crystal and Quinton Peeples	Justin Bartha, Annette Bening, Dick Cavett, Auliʻi Cravalho, Billy Crystal, Rachel Dratch, Darrell Hammond, Christopher Jackson, Kevin Kline, Robin Thede, and full cast	Audible Originals	Finalist	
2020 25th	Puss in Boots: A Musical (2019)	Neil Fishman, Harvey Edelman, and Khristine Hvam	Jim Dale, Mark Aldrich, Barrett Leddy, Nick Sullivan, Brian Holden, Al Fallick, Lisa Livesay, Meredith Inglesby, Lynn Norris, John E. Brady, and Johnny Heller	Harper Audio	Finalist	
2021 26th	Doctor Who: Stranded (Series 1)	Matt Fitton, David K. Barnes, Lisa McMullin, and John Dorney	Paul McGann, Nicola Walker, Hattie Morahan, Rebecca Root, Tom Price, and Tom Baker	Big Finish Productions	Winner	
2021 26th	ATA Girl 2	Helen Goldwyn and Louise Jameson	Cory Chambers, Kate Copeland, Amy Downham, Helen Goldwyn, Holly Jackson Walters, Louise Jameson, Wilf Scolding, and Elinor Lawless	Big Finish Productions	Finalist	
2021 26th	Come Find Me	Erin Mallon	Cynthia Darlow, Jonathan Davis, Caitlin Kelly, Erin Mallon, and Thérèse Plummer	Erin Mallon	Finalist	
2021 26th	The Ernie Pyle Experiment!	Michael Brainard (script ed. Russell McGee)	Michael Brainard, Greta Lind, Kate Braun, Andrew Bowen, Josh Hogan, Tim Grimm, Peter Spellos, and full cast	WFIU Public Radio	Finalist	
2021 26th	Frankenstein: A Stage Adaptation	A. S. Peterson	Jared Reinfeldt, Euriamis Losada, Henry O. Arnold, Kim Bretton, Morgan Davis, Matt Rose, Micah Williams, Brooks Bennett, Austin Olive, and Garris Wimmer	Oasis Audio	Finalist	
2022 27th	Sherlock Holmes: The Seamstress of Peckham Rye	Jonathan Barnes	Nicholas Briggs, Richard Earl, Lucy Briggs-Owen, India Fisher, James Joyce, Anjella MacKintosh, Glen McCready, and Mark Elstob	Big Finish Productions	Winner	
2022 27th	Chonburi International Hotel and Butterfly Club	Shakina Nayfack	Shakina Nayfack, Kate Bornstein, Annie Golden, Telly Leung, Jason Tam, Bianca Leigh, Ivory Aquino, Pooya Mohseni, Samy Figaredo, Angelica Ross, Liz Lark Brown, Ita Segev, and Dana Aliya Levinson	Audible Originals	Finalist	
2022 27th	The Coldest Case: A Black Book Title	James Patterson, Aaron Tracy, and Ryan Silbert	Aaron Paul, Krysten Ritter, Nathalie Emmanuel, Beau Bridges, and a full cast	Audible Originals	Finalist	
2022 27th	The Fyodor Dostoevsky BBC Radio Drama Collection	Fyodor Dostoevsky	Roy Marsden, Alex Jennings, Roger Allam, Paul Rhys, Nicholas Boulton, Paul Hilton, David Suchet, Barnaby Kay, and Lia Williams	BBC Audio/ Penguin Random House UK	Finalist	
2022 27th	No-No Boy (2010)	Ken Narasaki, from the novel by John Okada	Greg Watanabe, Kurt Kanazawa, Emily Kuroda, John Miyasaki, Ken Narasaki, Sharon Omi, Joy Osmanski, Sab Shimono, and Paul Yen	L.A. Theatre Works	Finalist	
2023 28th	Pipeline (2017)	Dominique Morisseau	Sophina Brown, Eugene Byrd, Demetrius Grosse, Sharon Lawrence, X Mayo, Uyoata Udi, and Karen Malina White	L.A. Theatre Works	Winner	
2023 28th	1984 (1949)	George Orwell, adapted by Anna Lea	Chris Lew Kum Hoi, Rhianne Barreto, Michael Maloney, Clare Corbett, Homer Todiwala, Jonathan Keeble, Rupert Holliday-Evans, Sarah Paul, Simon Shepherd, Theo Solomon, Wayne Forester, Finnigan Morris, Hugo Whysall, Jake Turner, Jo Ashe, Katrina Cooke, Linton Tulloch, Morgan Denman, Bronwen Denman, Muriel Abehsera, and Rob Wilson	Storytel	Finalist	
2023 28th	Clean Sweep	Ilona Andrews	Alejandro Ruiz, Christopher Walker, Holly Adams, James Lewis, Karen Novack, Ken Jackson, Nora Achrati, Peter Holdway, Elias Khalil, Ryan Reid, and Alex Hill-Knight	GraphicAudio	Finalist	
2023 28th	Coraline (2002)	Neil Gaiman	Julian Rhind-Tutt, Pixie Davies, Katherine Kingsley, Julian Clary, Jacqueline Boatswain, Kevin McNally, Adjoa Andoh, Adrian Schiller, Heather Nicol, William Parker, and Nicole Davis	HarperAudio	Finalist	
2023 28th	Good Omens (1990)	Neil Gaiman and Terry Pratchett	Rebecca Front, Michael Sheen, David Tennant, Katherine Kingsley, Arthur Darvill, Peter Forbes, Gabrielle Glaister, Louis Davison, Pixie Davies, Chris Nelson, Ferdinand Frisby Williams, Adjoa Andoh, Allan Corduner, Kobna Holdbrook-Smith, John Hopkins, Lorelei King, Matt Reeves, and Lemn Sissay	HarperAudio	Finalist	
2024 29th	Third Eye	Felicia Day	Felicia Day, Neil Gaiman, and full cast	Audible Originals	Winner	
2024 29th	None of This Is True (2023)	Lisa Jewell	Nicola Walker, Louise Brealey, and a full cast	Simon & Schuster Audio	Finalist	
2024 29th	Once Upon a Time in Nazi Occupied Tunisia	Josh Azouz	Laila Ayad, Tara Lynne Barr, and a full cast	L.A. Theatre Works	Finalist	
2024 29th	Star Wars: The Battle of Jedha (The High Republic)	George Mann	Raphael Corkhill, Kristen Sieh, and a full cast	Penguin Random House Audio	Finalist	
2024 29th	Red Rising (2014)	Pierce Brown	Stewart Crank, John Kielty, and a full cast	Graphic Audio	Finalist	
2025 30th	George Orwell’s 1984	George Orwell, adapted by Joe White	Andrew Garfield, Cynthia Erivo, and a full cast	Audible Originals	Winner	
2025 30th	Brokedown Prophets	S. A. Cosby	Jonathan Majors, Brian Tyree Henry, and a full cast	SBH Productions/Audible Originals	Finalist	
2025 30th	The Coldest Case: The Past Has a Long Memory	James Patterson, Aaron Tracy, and Ryan Silbert	Aaron Paul, Krysten Ritter, and a full cast	Audible Originals	Finalist	
2025 30th	Journey’s End (1929)	R. C. Sherriff	James Callis, Josh Cole, and a full cast	L.A. Theatre Works	Finalist	
2025 30th	Wild with Happy	Colman Domingo	Colman Domingo, Alex Newell, Sharon Washington, and a full cast	Audible Originals	Finalist	
