= Sab Shimono =

American actor (born 1937)

- Born: Saburo Shimono; July 31, 1937 (age 89); Sacramento, California, U.S.
- Education: University of California, Berkeley
- Occupation: Actor
- Years active: 1962–present
- Spouse: Steve Alden Nelson (m. 2008)
- Website: www.sabshimono.com

Saburo Shimono (下野 三郎, Shimono Saburō; born July 31, 1937), commonly known as Sab Shimono, is an American actor of Japanese descent. He began his career on stage on Broadway and in regional theaters, starring in musicals like Mame, Lovely Ladies, Kind Gentlemen, and Pacific Overtures. He has appeared in dozens of films and television shows in character roles, including Midway, Gung Ho, Presumed Innocent, Teenage Mutant Ninja Turtles III, The Shadow, Jackie Chan Adventures, Samurai Jack, and Southland Tales.

== Early life and education ==
Saburo Shimono was born in 1937 in Sacramento, California, to restaurant owners Edith Mary (née Otani) and Masauchi Shimono.

During World War II, following the signing of Executive Order 9066, Shimono and his family were interned at the Tule Lake War Relocation Center and the Granada War Relocation Center. Shimono later played a character who had a similar experience in a 2023 TV episode of Magnum P.I.

He attended Sacramento High School and graduated from University of California, Berkeley.

== Career ==
Shimono has appeared on Broadway and in regional theaters including San Francisco's American Conservatory Theater and Berkeley Repertory Theatre. He was cast as Ito opposite Angela Lansbury's Auntie Mame in Jerry Herman's Broadway musical hit Mame in 1966. This was followed by Lovely Ladies, Kind Gentlemen (1970), The Chickencoop Chinaman (1972), and the role of Manjiro in Stephen Sondheim and Harold Prince's Pacific Overtures (1976) – he would go on to play Lord Abe in the 2004 Broadway revival. He was in the short-lived 1978 musical Barbary Coast, and was nominated for a Drama Desk Award for Outstanding Actor in a Play for his leading performance in Philip Kan Gotanda's The Wash. In 2010, he appeared in the world premiere of No-No Boy by Ken Narasaki based on the novel by John Okada. He is closely affiliated with the East West Players and South Coast Repertory companies, appearing in a run of Julia Cho's Aubergine.

His film roles include Lt. Tomonaga in Midway, Saito in the 1986 comedy Gung Ho, Hiroshi Kawamura in the 1990 drama Come See the Paradise, the coroner "Painless" Kumagai in 1990's Presumed Innocent, Dr. Max Shinoda in 1993's Suture, Lord Norinaga in 1993's Teenage Mutant Ninja Turtles III, and in Old Dogs, alongside John Travolta and Robin Williams, as Japanese billionaire Yoshiro Nishamura. He played Dr. Tam in the 1994 film The Shadow. He can also be seen in Asian American independent films Americanese (2006), The Sensei (2008) and Life Tastes Good (1999). Shimono performed the voice of Subotai in the 1982 film Conan the Barbarian, dubbing actor Gerry Lopez.

On television, he starred on the 2008 ABC family miniseries Samurai Girl. Shimono provided the voices of antique-shop owner/Chi Wizard Uncle on the television series Jackie Chan Adventures, the elderly version of the Emperor (Jack's father) on Samurai Jack, Airbending Master Monk Gyatso and Master Yu in Avatar: The Last Airbender, Mister Sparkle ("In Marge We Trust") and Master Sushi Chef ("One Fish, Two Fish, Blowfish, Blue Fish") on The Simpsons and Mr. Murakami on 2012's Teenage Mutant Ninja Turtles series. He also appeared in Royal Pains, season 3 episode "But There's a Catch", as Jono the gardener. In 2007, he appeared in the episode "Don't Worry, Speed Racer" on Two and a Half Men. Shimono appeared in two episodes of the television show M*A*S*H.

== Personal life ==
Shimono is gay and has been in a relationship with writer Steve Alden Nelson since 2001. The couple registered their domestic partnership in April 2005 and married in San Diego on June 23, 2008.

== Theater credits ==
Year	Title	Role	Company	Notes
1964	Flower Drum Song	Wang Ta	Melody Fair Theatre	
1965	South Pacific	Henry	New York City Center	
1966-68	Mame	Ito (original cast)	The Shubert Organization	
1968	Mame (West Coast)	Ito (replacement)	The Shubert Organization	
1968-70	Mame	Ito (replacement)	The Shubert Organization	
1970-71	Lovely Ladies, Kind Gentlemen	Ancient Man, Mr. Keora, Okinawan, Mr. Oshira (understudy)	Majestic Theatre	
1972	The Chickencoop Chinaman	Kenji	The American Place Theatre	
1973	Othello	The Clown	Amas Musical Theatre	
1973-75	Santa Anita '42	Commissioner, Michael	Playwrights Horizons Company	
1974	Ride the Winds	Yamada	Majestic Theatre	
1976	Pacific Overtures	Manjiro, Ensemble Member	The Shubert Organization	
1978	Barbary Coast	Captain Chung	Orpheum Theatre	LA Weekly Theater Award for Outstanding Performance in a Leading Role
1980	The Music Lessons	Kaoru Kawaguchi	The Public Theater	
1983	Mame	Ito	Gershwin Theatre	
1985-86	As the Crow Flies	P.K.	Los Angeles Theatre Center	
1985-86	The Wash	Sadao	Mark Taper Forum	
1988-89	Yankee Dawg You Die	Vincent Chang	Playwrights Horizons	Drama-Logue Award
1990-91	The Wash	Nobu Matsumoto	Manhattan Theatre Club	Nominated- Drama Desk Award for Outstanding Actor in a Play
1995-96	Ballad of Yachiyo	Papa	South Coast Repertory	
1998	Red	Hua	Intiman Theatre	
2000	Follies	Ben	East West Players	
2001	Yankee Dawg You Die	Vincent Chang	East West Players	
2002	Sisters Matsumoto	Hideo	East West Players	
2003	The Nisei Widows Club	Tak	East West Players	
2004	The Wind Cries Mary	Dr. Nakada	East West Players	
2004-05	Pacific Overtures	Lord Abe	Roundabout Theatre Company	
2008	The Pleasure of His Company	Toi	Old Globe Theatre	
2008	A Majority of One	Koichi Asano	West Coast Jewish Theatre	
2010	No-No Boy	Pa	Miles Memorial Playhouse	
2011	Wrinkles	Grandpa Harry	East West Players	
2014	The Orphan of Zhao	Gongsun Chujiu, Ensemble Member	American Conservatory Theater	
2015	tokyo fish story	Koji	South Coast Repertory	
2016	Aubergine	Mr. Park	Berkeley Repertory Theatre	
2019	Aubergine	Mr. Park	South Coast Repertory	

== Filmography ==
=== Film ===
Year	Title	Role	Notes
1970	Loving	Byron	
1971	The Hospital	Operating Room Staff Member	Uncredited
1972	Parades	Togo	
1976	Midway	Lt. Joichi Tomonaga	
1978	Rabbit Test	Chinese Leader	
1981	Nice Dreams	Oriental Bus Boy	
1982	Conan the Barbarian	Subutai (voice)	Uncredited
1982	The Challenge	Toshio Yoshida	
1983	Where the Toys Come From	Kenji the Designer	
1986	Gung Ho	Saito	
1987	Blind Date	Mr. Yakamoto	
1988	The Wash	Sadao	
1990	Presumed Innocent	Dr. "Painless" Kumagai	
1990	Come See the Paradise	Hiroshi Kawamura	
1993	Teenage Mutant Ninja Turtles III	Lord Norinaga	
1993	Suture	Dr. Max Shinoda	
1994	3 Ninjas Kick Back	Koga	
1994	Murder Between Friends	Dr. Lee	
1994	The Shadow	Dr. Roy Tam	
1995	Waterworld	Elder	
1997	Paradise Road	Col. Hirota	
1998	The Big Hit	Jiro Nishi	
1999	Life Tastes Good	Harry Sado	
2000	Luminarias	Lu's Father	
2001	Ice Planet	Karteez A. Rumla	
2003	Robot Stories	John	Segment: "Clay"
2004	Worlds Apart	Teijo	
2006	Americanese	Wood Ding	
2006	Southland Tales	Hideo Takehashi	
2008	The Sensei	Taki Nakano	
2009	Scooby-Doo! and the Samurai Sword	Takagawa (voice)	Direct-to-video
2009	Old Dogs	Yoshiro Nishamura	
2011	The Arcadian	Moto	
2013	Yellow Face	HYH	
2013	Sex & Marriage	Mike	
2016	The Watcher	Wendell	

=== Television ===
Year	Title	Role	Notes
1962	Armstrong Circle Theatre	Father Chen	Episode: "The Cross and the Dragon"
1964	East Side/West Side	Sam	Episode: "If Your Grandmother Had Wheels"
1967	Coronet Blue	Student	Episode: "Tomoyo"
1973	Pueblo	Capt. Rhee	Television film
1976	Pacific Overtures	Manjiro, Ensemble Member	Television film
1977	Baa Baa Black Sheep	Japanese Bomber Commander	Episode: "Divine Wind"
1977–78	The Krofft Supershow	Huli	Main cast
1978	And the Soul Shall Dance	Murata	Television film
1978, 1980	M*A*S*H	Kwang, Jin	2 episodes
1979	How the West Was Won	Cook	Episode: "The Gunfighter"
1979	Mandrake	Ho	Television film
1979	When Hell Was in Session	Cao	Television film
1980, 1981	Quincy, M.E.	Ito, Governor	3 episodes
1981	The Waltons	Cpl. Kiyomo	Episode: "The Last Ten Days"
1981	Palmerstown, U.S.A.	Yeung-Lee	Episode: "Epidemic"
1982	Bring 'Em Back Alive	Nakamoto	Episode: "Seven Keys to Singapore"
1982	Cagney & Lacey	Cunningham	Episode: "One of Our Own"
1982	Hart to Hart	Koji	Episode: "Rich and Hartless"
1982	Modesty Blaise	Weng	Television film
1982, 1986	Remington Steele	Kenji Ito, Sam Kuromatsu	2 episodes
1983	Knight Rider	Hito Osaka	Episode: "Give Me Liberty... or Give Me Death"
1983	Tales of the Gold Monkey	Gen. Anago	Episode: "Mourning Becomes Matuka"
1984	Call to Glory	Diem	Episode: "Go/No Go"
1984	Santa Barbara	Caretaker	Episode #1.58
1985	Airwolf	Ko	Episode: "The American Dream"
1985	Street Hawk	Mr. Chen	Episode: "Chinatown Memories"
1985	Hotel	Inspector James Matsuoka	Episode: "Identities"
1986	Our House	Veterinarian	Episode: "Choices"
1986	A Year in the Life	Kwan	Miniseries; 1 episode
1986–87	Gung Ho	Saito	9 episodes
1988	Max Headroom	Ped Xing	Episode: "Neurostim"
1989	Knots Landing	Pharmacist	2 episodes
1990	Newhart	Suntara	Episode: "The Last Newhart"
1990	Hiroshima: Out of the Ashes	Shizuo	Television film
1990	Dear John	Charlie Moura	Episode: "Hot Lips Lacey"
1991	Plymouth	Hiro	Television film
1991	American Playhouse	Takahashi Hosoume	Episode: "Hot Summer Winds"
1991, 1997	The Simpsons	Master Chef, Mr. Sparkle (voice)	2 episodes
1992	Raven	Mr. Koyosaka	Episode: "The Death of Sheila"
1993	Silent Cries	Natsume	Television film
1994	All-American Girl	Sammy	Episode: "Yung at Heart"
1994	The X-Files	Gung Bituen	Episode: "Excelsis Dei"
1996	The Steve Harvey Show	Bobby Wong	Episode: "Loose Lips Sink Friendships"
1996	Seinfeld	Executive No. 1	Episode: "The Checks"
1996	ER	Dr. Richard Okida	Episode: "No Brain, No Gain"
1999	Jack & Jill	Mr. Tanaka	Episode: "The Awful Truth"
2000–05	Jackie Chan Adventures	Uncle (voice)	Main cast
2001–17	Samurai Jack	The Emperor (voice)	5 episodes
2006	Justice League Unlimited	Monk (voice)	Episode: "Dead Reckoning"
2006	Popcorn Zen	Kan Ogawa	Episode #2.1
2005–07	Avatar: The Last Airbender	Monk Gyatso, Master Yu (voice)	6 episodes
2007	Two and a Half Men	Hiroshi	Episode: "Don't Worry, Speed Racer"
2007	Clark and Michael	Man at Driving Range	2 episodes
2007	Legion of Super Heroes	K3NT (voice)	Episode: "The Man from the Edge of Tomorrow"
2007	Ben 10: Race Against Time	Hubbard	Television film
2008	Samurai Girl	Noriyuki	Miniseries; 2 episodes
2010	The Boondocks	Long Dou (voice)	Episode: "The Red Ball"
2010	Mad Men	Ichiro Kamura	Episode: "The Chrysanthemum and the Sword"
2011–12	Hawaii Five-0	Keako Kelly	3 episodes
2015	Longmire	Francis Igawa	Episode: "War Eagle"
2012–15	Teenage Mutant Ninja Turtles	Mr. Murakami (voice)	4 episodes
2016	Flaked	Wild Bill	Episode: "Palms"
2016	Legends of Tomorrow	Ichiro Yamashiro	Episode: "Shogun"
2017	The Blacklist	Daniel Nakamoto	Episode: "Dembe Zuma (No. 10)"
2017	Ave 43	Dr. Dye	Web series; 4 episodes
2017–18	Stretch Armstrong and the Flex Fighters	Grandpa Park (voice)	Recurring role (seasons 1 and 2)
2019	The Terror	Kazu	Episode: "Into the Afterlife"
2023	Magnum P.I.	George Nakamura	Episode: "Appetite for Danger"

=== Video games ===
Year	Title	Role	Notes
2009	Indiana Jones and the Staff of Kings	Archie Tan	
