= Emily Kuroda =

American actress (born 1952)

- Born: Emily Keiko Kuroda; October 30, 1952 (age 73); Fresno, California U.S.
- Occupation: Actress
- Years active: 1982–present
- Spouse: Alberto Isaac (m. 1980)

Emily Keiko Kuroda (born October 30, 1952) is an American actress. She is best known for her role as Mrs. Kim on TV's Gilmore Girls, but she has had a long career on stage and screen and is a veteran of East West Players, Los Angeles's premier Asian American theater group.

== Early life and education ==
Kuroda, a Japanese American, was born in Fresno, California on October 30, 1952, the daughter of Kay and William Kuroda. She began acting and directing in high school and majored in drama at California State University, Fresno before launching her career on stage and screen.

== Career ==
Kuroda has performed in numerous plays including Luis Alfaro's Straight as a Line at Playwrights' Arena, directed by Jon Lawrence Rivera, Chay Yew's Red at East West Players, Winter People at the Boston Court, and Ken Narasaki's Innocent When You Dream at the Electric Lodge, which was directed by her husband, Alberto Isaac. She appeared in Narasaki's No-No Boy at the Miles Memorial Playhouse in Santa Monica CA, also directed by Isaac, alongside her Gilmore Girls daughter, Keiko Agena. Other theatres include New York's Public Theater, La Jolla Playhouse, Seattle Rep, Singapore Repertory Theatre, Berkeley Repertory Theatre, LA Women's Shakespeare Company, Los Angeles Shakespeare Festival, and Lodestone Theatre Ensemble.

Kuroda completed seven years as Mrs. Kim in Warner Brothers’ Gilmore Girls as well as the Netflix revisit in 2016. She also played opposite Flavor Flav in 13 episodes of Under One Roof. Recent television credits include a recurring role on Drop Dead Diva (as Margaret Cho's mother), Medium, Grey's Anatomy, In Case of Emergency, Six Feet Under, The King of Queens, Curb Your Enthusiasm, The Practice, General Hospital, Port Charles, L.A. Law, ER, The Young and the Restless, The Bold and the Beautiful, The Division, The Agency, Presidio Med, Arliss, and the television special About Love (Emmy nominated). Feature films include RED, PEEP WORLD, Minority Report, Stranger Inside, 2 Days in the Valley, Dad, Broken Words, Worth Winning and Shopgirl. She has also appeared in independent Asian American films, including The Sensei, Yellow and Stand Up for Justice.

She is a member of the Screen Actors Guild, American Federation of Television and Radio Artists, and the Actors' Equity Association.

== Personal life ==
Kuroda is married to actor Alberto Isaac.

== Filmography ==
=== Film ===
Year	Title	Role	Notes	Source
1986	American Geisha	Kikusen		
1989	Solo	Taki	Short	
1989	Worth Winning	Cory Chu		
1989	Dad	Vicki		
1990	Why Me?	News Anchorwoman		
1991	Late for Dinner	Nurse Ruth		
1993	Broken Words	Grandmother		
1998	Yellow	Mrs. Lee		
1999	The Suburbans	Mrs. Lee Lee		
2001	Stranger Inside	Min		
2003	Day of Independence	Choir Member	Short	
2004	Stand Up for Justice	Mrs. Matsuoka	Short	
2005	Pawns of the King	Keiko	Short	
2005	Shopgirl	Japanese Woman	Short	
2006	My Prince, My Angel	Shen's Mother	Short	
2008	The Sensei	Flora Nakano		
2009	Hotel for Dogs	Social Worker		
2009	Aussie and Ted's Great Adventure	Mei Mei		
2009	Love 10 to 1	Ma		
2010	The Man Who Invented the Words		Short	
2010	Peep World	Nail Salon Owner		
2010	RED	Mrs. Chan		
2010	A Super Duper Exotic Erotic Fetish Sexy Must See Story... A Tragedy of Oriental Proportions!		Short	
2011	Lost Rites	Jun-Li	Short	
2012	Family Restaurant	Female Customer/Still Photographer	Short	
2013	Family Gathering	Co-producer	Short	
2013	Yellow Face	Gish Jen		
2013	Uncle Bart	Mrs. Park	Short	
2014	Alec Mapa: Baby Daddy	Special Thanks	Documentary	
2015	Maybe Someday	Mrs. Kibble		
2016	Justice Angel	Fang		
2017	Take the 10	Patti		
2022	Kimi	Dr. Sarah Burns		
2022	Strange World	Ro (voice)		
2026	The End of Oak Street	Mrs. Valcourt		

=== Television ===
Year	Title	Role	Notes	Source
1982	Remington Steele	Akemi	Episode: "Your Steele the One for Me"	
1983	Tales of the Gold Monkey	Geisha Girl	Episode: "Naka Jima Kill"	
1985	CBS Storybreak	Voice	Episode: "Yeh-Shen: A Cinderella Story from China"	
1987	Gung Ho	Yukiko Saito	2 episodes	
1988	Matlock	Receptionist	Episode: "The Investigation: Part 1"	
1988	MacGyver	Karen Matsuga	Episode: "The Spoilers"	
1988–89	L.A. Law	Ronnie Page	6 episodes	
1989	The Preppie Murder	Reporter	TV movie	
1990	Lifestories	Room Nurse	Episode: "Don Chapin"	
1990	Midnight Patrol: Adventures in the Dream Zone	Voice	13 episodes	
1990	She Said No	Regina	TV movie	
1990	Donor	ICU Nurse	TV movie	
1990–91	Knots Landing	Woman/Cleaning Lady/Banker	3 episodes	
1991	Columbo	Linda	Episode: "Caution: Murder Can Be Hazardous to Your Health"	
1991	Life Goes On	Dr. Kito	Episode: "Dr. Kito"	
1991	Dynasty: The Reunion	Nurse Lin	TV movie	
1991–92	Doogie Howser, M.D.	Anesthesiologist/Janet Masuda	2 episodes	
1992	Sisters	Reporter/Nurse	2 episodes	
1992	Ladykiller	Jack's Secretary	TV movie	
1992–93	The Jackie Thomas Show	Waitress	2 episodes	
1993	Shadowhunter	ADR Loop Group	TV movie	
1993	About Love	Jeannette Kim	TV movie	
1993	Melrose Place	Nurse	Episode: "Carpe Diem"	
1994	A Perry Mason Mystery: The Case of the Lethal Lifestyle	Dr. Nancy Lee	TV movie	
1995	Awake to Danger		TV movie	
1995	Never Say Never: The Deidre Hall Story	O.R. Nurse	TV movie	
1996	ER	Dottie, Hospital Day-Care Worker	Episode: "Take These Broken Wings"	
1996	Party Girl	Mikoto	Episode: "Pilot"	
1997	Heartless	Dr. Alice Morisaki	TV movie	
1998	Profiler	Dr. Garson	Episode: "Bloodlust"	
1998	The Young and the Restless	Nurse Candice Katsumoto	6 episodes	
1999	Working	Executive Storyteller #3	Episode: "Romeo and Julie"	
1999	Party of Five	Nurse Wolfe	Episode: "Rings of Saturn"	
1999	L.A. Heat	Mrs. Kwan	Episode: "F Is for Framed"	
1999	The Practice	Miss Hines - Dental Hygienist	Episode: "Free Dental"	
1999	Snoops	KDLA Reporter	Episode: "The Grinch"	
2000	Chicago Hope	Dr. Bates	Episode: "Simon Sez"	
2000	Shasta McNasty	Nurse	Episode: "The Sugar Pill"	
2000	Family Law	Dr. Braun	Episode: "Affairs of the State"	
2000–07	Gilmore Girls	Mrs. Kim	43 episodes	
2001	The King of Queens	Lily	Episode: "Sight Gag"	
2001	Curb Your Enthusiasm	Restaurant Employee	Episode: "The Shrimp Incident"	
2001–02	The Agency		3 episodes	
2003	The Handler	Dr. Kim Anderson	Episode: "Under Color of Law"	
2004	Six Feet Under	Dr. Key	Episode: "Grinding the Corn"	
2006	Clark and Michael	Driving Range Woman		
2007	In Case of Emergency	Mrs. Tuckman	Episode: "Forbidden Love"	
2007	State of Mind	Doctor	Episode: "Passion Fishing"	
2007–14	The Bold and the Beautiful	Dr. Kimborough/Archive Footage	6 episodes	
2008-2009	Under One Roof	Su Ho	13 episodes	
2009	Grey's Anatomy	Kendall Sully	Episode: "Stand By Me"	
2010	Medium	Morgue Attendant	Episode: "Bring Your Daughter to Work Day"	
2010–11	Drop Dead Diva	Mrs. Lee	2 episodes	
2012	Dakota	Cleaning Woman	Episode: "Down $1,170"	
2012	BFFs	Jessica's Mother	2 episodes	
2012	Slanted	Auntie Linda	Episode: "Paying Your Dues"	
2012	Scruples	Cecile	TV movie	
2013	Bloodline	Gloria	TV movie	
2014	Sequestered	Rufang	12 episodes	
2014–15	Just Us Guys	Mrs. K	5 episodes	
2016	Gilmore Girls: A Year in the Life	Mrs. Kim	Episode: "Spring"	
2018	The Resident	Penny Oh	Episode: "The Germ"	
2019	The Good Doctor	Sunny Lee	Episode: "Xin"	
2021	All Rise	Dr. Johnson	Episode: "Safe to Fall"	
2022	Baymax!	Kiko (voice)	2 episodes	
2023	The Power	Sister Veronica	Recurring role	

== Video games ==
Year	Title	Role	Notes	Source
2026	Yakuza Kiwami 3 & Dark Ties	Additional voices		

== Theatre ==
Year	Title	Role	Notes
	Straight as a Line		
	Red		East West Players
	Winter People		Boston Court
	Innocent When You Dream		Electric Lodge
	No-No Boy		Miles Memorial Playhouse in Santa Monica, California

== Awards and other recognitions ==
Year	Award	Category	Nominated work	Result
	Drama-Logue Awards		Ikebana, The Maids, Minimata, The Golden Gate, and Visitors from Nagasaki	Won
	City of Los Angeles Commendation		About Love	Won
	Back Stage West Garland Award	Outstanding Performance	Straight as a Line	Won
1999	Los Angeles Times	Top 10	Straight as a Line	Won
2000	Los Angeles Ovation Award	Best Lead Actress in a Play	Straight as a Line	Nominated
2001	Los Angeles Times	Top 10	Red	Won
2004	Entertainment Today Award	Best Actress	Winter People	Won
2006	East West Players' Rae Creevey Award			Won
2006	Playwrights' Arena Award	Outstanding Contribution to Los Angeles Theatre		Won
