= Narasaki =

Narasaki (written: 楢崎) is a Japanese surname. Notable people with the surname include:

- Karen Narasaki (born 1958), American civil rights leader and human rights activist
- Ken Narasaki (born 1958), Japanese-American playwright
- Meichi Narasaki (楢崎 明智, born 1999), Japanese sport climber and boulderer
- Narasaki Ryō (楢崎 龍, 1841–1906), also known as Oryō, Japanese woman, wife of Sakamoto Ryōma
- Tomoa Narasaki (楢崎 智亜, born 1996), Japanese sport climber and boulderer
- Yasumasa Narasaki (楢崎 泰昌, 1928–2014), Japanese politician

== See also ==
- Narasaki Senpakukogyo Limited, a shipbuilder in Muroran, Hokkaidō, Japan
