= Garret T. Sato =

American actor (1964–2020)

- Born: November 7, 1964; Oahu, Hawaii
- Died: 25 March 2020 (aged 55)
- Years active: 1993–2020

Garret T. Sato (November 7, 1964 – March 25, 2020) was an American actor who was born and raised in Oahu, Hawaii. He attended Aiea High School and Leeward Community College where he took up acting. He was Yonsei (fourth generation Japanese American). Sato has well over 80 credits, including such films as Midway, The Shadow, Pearl Harbor, Beyond Paradise, Street Kings and The Mask.

Prior to his death, he resided in Los Angeles and Oahu, Hawaii.

== Acting roles ==
=== Film credits ===
In The Mask, the villain of the film is played by actor Peter Greene for the majority of the film. However, once the character dons the titular mask and is magically transformed the character is played alternatively by Sato and professional wrestler Jeep Swenson.

In 2005, he played a role in Lane Nishikawa's film Only the Brave, about the Japanese American segregated fighting unit, the 442nd Regimental Combat Team of World War II. He had a short film Mojave 43 premiered at the AFI. Sato appeared in the 2013 films The Wolverine, ODE IN BLOOD. In 2016, he was in pre-production on "House Rules" and premiered in five films Megan, Leland, Buddy Solitaire, The Last Tour and Eternal Salvation .

=== Television credits ===
He also appeared in numerous television shows such as: The Family Business, Inhumans, Alias, ER, 24 and NCIS: Los Angeles. He was recurring on Hawaii Five-0 as Detective Ahuna. He was quoted as saying, "As an actor I take great pride in the art of acting for it is part of WHO I AM."

== Filmography ==
Year	Title	Role	Notes
1993	Son in Law	Male Hairdresser	
1994	The Shadow	Mongol	
1994	The Mask	Dorian Tyrell (in makeup)	Uncredited
1995	Midnight Man		Uncredited
1995	The Dangerous	Ryo	
1996	Bulletproof	Bad Guy	
1998	Beyond Paradise	Angry ex-boyfriend	
2001	Pearl Harbor	Japanese Soldier #2	
2003	Chick Street Fighter	Bobby Chang	
2005	Lethal	Triad	
2006	Only the Brave	Cpl. Richard 'Hilo' Imamura	
2006	All In	Black Tie Asian Player	
2006	Aces	Chow	
2006	Ghost Hunters: Point of Contact	Satoshi	
2007	Machine	Cho	
2008	The Flyboys	Sato	
2008	Street Kings	Toilet Man	
2008	Stiletto	Aki	
2009	Fear of Attraction	Monk	
2009	Bonita Beach Bob	Jerome	
2010	Corrado	Jimmy Kim	
2010	Project Purgatory	Yudai Yamaguchi	
2011	Violent Blue	Liam	
2011	Wasteland	Keo Tanaka	
2011	Knots	Hoku's Dad	
2011	Repeat Offenders: Jamais Vu	Hiroshi Katana	
2013	Blue Dream		
2013	The Wolverine	Dying Yakuza	
2015	To Topple an Empire	Charlie	
2016	Buddy Solitaire	Tyson	
2016	The Last Tour	Meat	
2016	Caged Beauty	The Apostle	
2016	Eternal Salvation	Eddie Sing	
2017	Jurassic School	Sammy	
2018	Sleeping Dogs Lie	Mr. Nakamura	
2018	Megan	Ganu Yoshida	Short
2018	Leland	Leland	Short
2019	Midway	Japanese Officer (Prison)	
