= Heartless (1997 film) =

- Written by: Leslie Lehr
- Directed by: Judith Vogelsang
- Starring: Madchen Amick; David Packer; Tom Schanley; Louise Fletcher
- Music by: Mike DeMartino
- Country of origin: United States
- Original language: English

Production
- Producer: Ami Artzi
- Cinematography: Stevan Larner
- Editor: Bob Wyman
- Running time: 120 minutes

Original release
- Release: November 5, 1997

Heartless is an American 1997 television film directed by Judith Vogelsang and starring Madchen Amick, David Packer, Tom Schanley, and Louise Fletcher.

== Plot ==
A heart transplant recipient adopts the personality of her donor.

== Cast ==
- Madchen Amick as Annie O'Keefe
- David Packer as Dep. Johnny Drummond
- Tom Schanley as Alexander Hawks
- Louise Fletcher as Lydia McGuffy
- Pamela Bellwood as Jennifer Chadway
- Monique Parent as Suzanne Chadway Hawks
- Rusty Schwimmer as Connie
- Emily Kuroda as Dr. Alice Morisaki
- Bo Svenson as Sam
