= The Passing (1983 film) =

- VHS cover
- Directed by: John Huckert
- Written by: John Huckert; Mary Maruca
- Produced by: John Huckert; Mary Maruca
- Starring: James Carroll Plaster; Welton Benjamin Johnson; John Huckert
- Edited by: John Huckert
- Release date: 1983
- Running time: 96 minutes
- Country: United States
- Language: English

The Passing is a 1983 American science fiction horror film co-written, co-produced, directed, edited by and starring John Huckert.

== Cast ==
- James Carroll Plaster as Ernie Neuman
- Welton Benjamin Johnson as Leviticus (Rose) Washington
- John Huckert as Wade Carney / Rejuvenated Ernie
- Lynn Odell as Monica / Foreign Movie Actress
- Daniel Dunn as Pudge (Wade's Son)
- Albert B. Smith as Man at Bar / Rapist / Encephalo-Transfer Body

== Production ==
The film was produced on a budget of around $80,000 to $100,000 over a period of over seven years. During this time, the film's lead actor James Carroll Plaster died.

== Release and reception ==
The Passing was first released in 1983. It was screened at the USA Film Festival in Dallas, Texas, as well as at the Houston International Film Festival. Following those showings, the film opened as a one-week engagement at the Biograph Theatre in Washington, D.C. in May 1985.

Paul Attanasio of The Washington Post called the film "powerfully evocative".

Arthur C. Clarke, writer of 2001: A Space Odyssey, called the film "Amazing! Profoundly poignant."

== Home media ==
In June 2019, The Passing was restored in 2K and released on DVD and Blu-ray by Vinegar Syndrome. This release includes four short films directed by Huckert: The Water That Is Passed, Quack (both 1976), Einmal (1979), and Ernie & Rose (1982).
