= Brad Maule =

American actor

- Born: George Bradley Maule; October 11, 1951 (age 74); Camp Springs, Fisher County, Texas, U.S.
- Occupations: Actor, Producer
- Years active: 1980–present

George Bradley Maule (born October 11, 1951) is an American actor best known for his role as Tony Jones on the American television serial General Hospital. He played the role from 1984 until February 2006.

== Acting Roles ==
- REDEARTH88 (Gregory Atkins - 2007)
- General Hospital (Dr. Tony Jones, 1984 - February 10, 2006, November 2019)
- 7th Heaven (12 episodes, 2002–2005)
- The Young and the Restless (Reverend Palmer, 2004)
- Passions (Dr. Able, 2003)
- Port Charles (Dr. Tony Jones - 1997, 1999, 2000)
- Too Soon for Jeff (1996)
- Buffalo Bill (1984)
- Malibu (1983)
- Three's Company (1981)
- Charlie's Angels (1980–1981)
- The Last Married Couple In America (1980)
- Barbary Coast (1978)
