= Only the Brave (2006 film) =

2006 American drama film

- Film poster
- Directed by: Lane Nishikawa
- Screenplay by: Lane Nishikawa
- Produced by: Karen Criswell; Eric Hayashi; Jay Koiwai; Lane Nishikawa
- Starring: Tamlyn Tomita; Lane Nishikawa; Greg Watanabe
- Cinematography: Michael G. Wojciechowski
- Edited by: Chisako Yokoyama
- Music by: Kimo Cornwell
- Distributed by: Indican Pictures
- Release dates: February 17, 2006 (DisOrient Asian American Film Festival)
- Running time: 99 minutes
- Country: United States
- Language: English

Only the Brave is a 2006 independent film about the 100th Infantry Battalion/442nd Regimental Combat Team, a segregated World War II fighting unit primarily made up of "Nisei" Japanese Americans, which for its size and length of service became the most decorated unit in U.S. military history. The film, produced and directed by Lane Nishikawa, is a fictionalized account of the rescue of the Lost Battalion.

== Plot ==
In 1953, Jimmy Takata (Nishikawa) suffers from "battle fatigue" (posttraumatic stress disorder), to the great concern of his wife, Mary (Tomita). Raised in Hawaii, Takata and some of his friends enlisted in the 100th Battalion, serving in the European Theater of Operations. In a series of flashbacks, he remembers the war and events in his life surrounding it. Following a head injury, he begins to have visions, and believes that he is seeing memories of other men, including his friend Freddy Watada (Watanabe) as he courted Mary (who would later be Jimmy's wife) before entering the Army. Freddy receives a "million-dollar wound" (one which is serious enough to require evacuation to the United States, but not permanently disabling), and he shows Takata an engagement ring, purchased before being sent to Europe, which he intends to give Mary upon his return.

Takata's concern about the visions is dismissed as disorientation caused by the head wound by "Doc" Naganuma, the unit medic, a Medical Doctor who had likewise joined to help his friends. Takata also has a vision of his father, a Buddhist priest in Federal custody, and who tells him "You must accept your fate, here"—pointing to his head -- "the rest of you will follow, here," pointing to Takata's heart. Takata later learns that his father has died, 49 days earlier. Buddhists believe that a spirit will enter Heaven or be reborn 49 days after death.

When his unit is ordered to break through German lines and rescue the 1st Battalion, 141st Infantry Regiment, Takata is ordered by the doctor to stay in the rear area, due to his head wound. However, as the casualties mount, he defies orders and attempts to find a way through to the trapped men. He is joined by several of his men (including Freddy), who are also unwilling to wait in the rear as their friends face the danger. Asked by a newly transferred soldier if he's ever afraid, Takata confides that his fear is of losing more men.

Joining the rest of the Nisei, Takata and his men fight the Germans, as one-by-one Takata watches his men—nearly all of his friends—being killed in battle. Freddy throws his body on a grenade which had been thrown at Takata, and the men look into each other's eyes as it explodes.

The battle won, Takata accepts the thanks of the lieutenant commanding the rescued unit, and notes that 211 of the 275 had been saved, at a cost of over 800 casualties.

His thoughts return to 1953, where Mary's love and tears finally break through, and he is able to shed his own tears. A vision comes of his lost men and father, standing in the field hospital, and his father repeats his earlier encouraging statement.

Now Takata's vision comes of meeting with Mary after the war, and meeting Mary and Freddy's young daughter, Joanie. Joanie touches the scar on his temple, and as she smiles and looks into his eyes, he is reminded of a refugee girl that he had rescued in the battle which had resulted in the head wound. Takata gives Mary the engagement ring, and explains that, since Freddy had given his life to save Takata's, the least he could do is to bring it home for her. He comforts her as she cries.

As that vision fades, we see Jimmy placing the keepsakes from each of his friends in a suitcase and closing it. Mary, sitting behind the wheel of a car, looks up and asks (hoping beyond hope) if he is okay. He looks at her, is able to smile, and says that he is.

== Cast ==
- Jennifer Aquino as Grace Nakajo
- Mark Dacascos as Steve Senzaki
- Jeff Fahey as Lieutenant William Terry
- Gina Hiraizumi as Eleanor Takase
- Jason Scott Lee as Glenn Takase
- Emily Liu as Nancy Loo
- Noriyuki (Pat) Morita as Jimmy Takata's Father
- Ken Narasaki as Richard "Doc" Naganuma
- Lane Nishikawa as Jimmy Takata
- Yuji Okumoto as Yukio Nakajo
- Tamlyn Tomita as Mary Takata
- Greg Watanabe as Freddy Watada
- Garret T. Sato as Richard Imamura
- Guy Ecker as Sergeant Robert King
- Brian Connolly as Connery, The Factory Boss

== See also ==
- Go For Broke Monument
- Go for Broke! (1951 film, directed by Robert Pirosh)
