= Hard (film) =

1998 American neo-noir crime thriller film by John Huckert

- Theatrical release poster
- Directed by: John Huckert
- Written by: John Huckert; John Matkowsky
- Produced by: John Huckert; John Matkowsky; Noel Palomaria
- Starring: Noel Palomaria; Malcolm Moorman; Charles Lanyer; Michael Waite; Paula Kay Perry; Alex DePedro; Bob Hollander; Steve Andrews; KD Jones; Ken Narasaki
- Cinematography: John Matkowsky
- Edited by: John Huckert
- Music by: John Huckert; Phil Settle
- Production company: MPH Productions
- Release date: 1998
- Running time: 102 minutes
- Country: United States
- Language: English
- Budget: $100,000

Hard is a 1998 American neo-noir crime thriller film directed and co-written by John Huckert. Frequently compared to William Friedkin's 1980 film Cruising, the film follows closeted Los Angeles Police Department detective Raymond Vates (Noel Palomaria) as he tries to catch a serial killer (Malcolm Moorman) who preys on male prostitutes. The soundtrack prominently includes music by Marilyn Manson, as well as a song by George Michael.

Premiering at the San Francisco International Lesbian and Gay Film Festival, Hard received mixed reviews from critics. The Los Angeles Times described it as one of the best films to screen at Outfest in 1998. The New York Times noted similarities in the story to the Jeffrey Dahmer case and praised Moorman's performance, while criticizing inconsistent screenwriting and performances. Variety published a more critical review, referring negatively to its depictions of graphic violence and sex, even as it credited the film with gay representation.

== Cast ==
- Noel Palomaria as Detective Raymond Vates
- Malcolm Moorman as Jack
- Charles Lanyer as Detective Tom Ellis
- Michael Waite as Andy
- Paula Kay Perry as Bette
- Alex DePedro as Andy Jr.
- Bob Hollander as Captain Foster
- Steve Andrews as Detective Hendrickson
- KD Jones as Detective Jackson
- Ken Narasaki as Detective Chyun
