= Tara Killian =

American film and television actress

Tara Killian (born June 21, 1977) is an American film and television actress. She held the national title "GuyRex's Miss Teen" in 1994 (Part of the Miss World America franchise). Tara attended Irmo High School in Columbia, SC and earned a B.A. in Music from the College of Charleston in Charleston, SC.

== Filmography ==
- The Rage: Carrie 2 (1999)
- Slaughter Studios (2002)
- Shallow Ground (2004)
- We All Fall Down (2005)
- American Pie Presents Band Camp (2005)
- Mr. Fix It (2006)
- Strangers Online (2007 - not yet released)

== Trivia ==
- Killian was accepted to medical school, but decided to pursue an acting career instead.
