= Greg Watanabe =

American actor (born 1967)

Greg Watanabe (born November 8, 1967) is an American actor known for his role in Watch Over Me. He also appears in the independent films, Philip Kan Gotanda's Life Tastes Good, Only the Brave and Americanese. He is a founding member of the Asian American sketch comedy troupe, 18 Mighty Mountain Warriors. Watanabe received a 2009 Los Angeles Drama Critics Circle Award nomination for Featured Performance in The Happy Ones at South Coast Repertory. In 2010, he appeared in the world premiere of Ken Narasaki's No-No Boy. In October 2015, Watanabe made his Broadway debut in Allegiance: A New American Musical at the Longacre Theatre in New York City with co-stars George Takei, Lea Salonga, Michael K. Lee and Telly Leung.

== Filmography ==
=== Film ===
Year	Title	Role	Notes
1994	You Not Chinese	Sam Kato	
1999	Life Tastes Good	Howard Sato	
2000	Camera Obscura	Policeman at Factory	
2006	Only the Brave	Pvt. Freddy Watada	
2006	Americanese	Young Wood	
2016	The Last Tour	Bone	
2016	George Takei's Allegiance	Mike Masaoka	
2020	Over the Moon	Male Customer / Rail Worker #2	Voice

=== Television ===
Year	Title	Role	Notes
1996	Vows of Deception	Police Officer	Television film
1997	Nash Bridges	Benny Yang	Episode: "Inside Out"
1997	Under Wraps	Doctor	Television film
2000	JAG	Agent Adachi	Episode: "Legacy: Part 1"
2002	Hidden Hills	Other Dad	Episode: "Pilot"
2005	Crossing Jordan	Dr. Lee Zhang	Episode: "You Really Got Me"
2006	Mighty Warriors of Comedy	—	Television film
2005, 2017	Curb Your Enthusiasm	Yoshi	2 episodes
2006–2007	Watch Over Me	Isaac	23 episodes
2008	Reno 911!	Asian husband	Episode: "Did Garcia Steal Dangle's Husband?"
2008	Criminal Minds	Medical Examiner	Episode: "The Instincts"
2012–2014	Oishi High School Battle	Ryuzu / Narrator	14 episodes
2014	Film Lab Presents	Factory King	Episode: "All Things Must End"
2016	One & Done	CFO	Episode: "Mark"
2016	Madam Secretary	President Aung Shwe	Episode: "The Middle Way"
2016	Aquarius	Satoshi	Episode: "Can You Take Me Back"
2018	Oishi: Demon Hunter	Ryuzu	16 episodes

== Awards and nominations ==
Ovation Awards

- 2011: Nominated for Featured Actor in a Play for the role of Sopoan in the Geffen Playhouse production of "Extraordinary Chambers"
