= Shallow Ground =

- Directed by: Sheldon Wilson
- Written by: Sheldon Wilson
- Produced by: Jason Ninness; Martin Mathieu; John P. Tarver; Sheldon Wilson
- Starring: Timothy V. Murphy; Stan Kirsch; Lindsey Stoddart; Patricia McCormack; Rocky Marquette; Tara Killian
- Cinematography: John P. Tarver
- Edited by: Sheldon Wilson
- Music by: Steve London
- Distributed by: Imagination Worldwide
- Release dates: April 24, 2004 (Dead by Dawn Edinburgh Horror Film Festival)
- Running time: 97 minutes
- Country: United States
- Language: English

Shallow Ground is a 2004 horror film written and directed by Sheldon Wilson and starring Timothy V. Murphy, Stan Kirsch, Lindsey Stoddart, Patty McCormack, and Rocky Marquette. Its plot follows a teenager covered in blood who appears at a police station holding a knife.

It was released on DVD in June 2005 in the United States.

== Plot ==
Sheriff Jack Shepherd is tasked with investigating a mysterious blood-covered boy who shows up at his station one day. The boy appears to be supernatural in nature, and manifests unusual powers such as the ability to read minds or show other people his memories by touching them.

Meanwhile, an unseen stalker is killing and butchering people in the woods. The audience is led to believe that the weird bloody boy is some sort of supernatural killer, similar to Jason Voorhees or Michael Myers.

It is revealed near the end of the movie that the dead across the world are rising up and seeking revenge on the people who killed them. These dead manifest as blood-covered humans that seek out and kill their original killers. If a killer has more than one victim, all the victims merge into a single composite being. The blood-covered boy is one such being, made up of 6 people from the community who were killed by the stalker some time before. He is going around reading people's minds to learn the identity of his killer.

The killer stalker turns out to be a local older woman, who has been murdering people in the community for some time. Her family was killed when the local dam broke, and in revenge she has been killing everyone involved with the dam, as well as their families. The bloody boy eventually tracks her down and kills her, just as she is about to kill Jack.

As the bloody boy walks away through the woods, he is suddenly attacked and killed by another bloody creature, this one much larger and more demonic-looking. The identity of the second blood creature is never explicitly revealed, but from the creature's appearance it is implied to be the old woman from earlier.

== Cast ==
- Timothy V. Murphy as Jack Sheppard
- Stan Kirsch as Stuart Dempsey
- Lindsey Stoddart as Laura Russell
- Patty McCormack as Helen Reedy
- Rocky Marquette as The Bloody Boy
- Natalie Avital as Darby Owens
- Chris Hendrie as Albert Underhill
- Tara Killian as Amy Underhill
- Myron Natwick as Harvey
- Steve Eastin as Detective Russell
- John Kapelos as Leroy Riley
- Christine Avila as Mrs. Underhill
- Ori Pfeffer as Curtis

== Production ==
Shoot in 16 mm film in June 2003, in Topanga Canyon and with a low budget of US$72,000, the producers used the SAG Experimental Program, in which no actors received payment in advance.

In reference to the scene where Darby gets attacked in the medical van, Natalie Avital said, "The stunt coordinator was great. For the scene where I am hanging from the branch they had this box and between takes they would throw the box in for me to rest on. It was a little wild when I was hanging, but I was hanging."

== Reception ==
On the review aggregator website Rotten Tomatoes, 50% of 6 critics' reviews are positive.

For Bloody Disgusting, Elaine Lamkin rated it 3 and a half out of 5 "skulls" highlighting in her review that "the story is a mixture of supernatural retribution, murder mystery and psychological thriller". For Empire, William Thomas rated it 3/5 stars concluded his comment by stating that "this is pure B-fodder, but it has a grim wit, grisly edge, creepy score and a disconcerting denouement."

Time Out highlighted that the film is "a frustrating mix of the familiar, the surprising and the downright daft, Sheldon Wilson’s ambitious, underachieved horror movie ultimately squanders its best ideas." For BBC, Paul Arendt wrote: "The unknown actors trudge gamely through a script that requires them to behave like simpletons, and there are some inventively bloody effects to make up for all the head-scratching you'll be doing in the first half."

== See also ==
- List of American films of 2004
- List of horror films of 2004
