= Slaughter Studios =

- Home video cover art
- Directed by: Brian Katkin
- Screenplay by: Dan Acre; John Huckert
- Story by: Damian Akhavi; Dan Acre; John Huckert
- Produced by: Damian Akhavi
- Starring: Nicolas Read; Amy Shelton-White; Tara Killian; Peter Stanovich; Anand Chulani; Eva Frajko; Matthew Roseman; Darren Keefe; Laura Otis; Darren Keefe; Serra Ellison; Lorissa McComas
- Cinematography: John Matkowsky
- Edited by: Brian Katkin
- Music by: Christopher Farrell
- Distributed by: New Concorde
- Release date: December 31, 2002
- Running time: 86 minutes
- Country: United States
- Language: English

Slaughter Studios is a 2002 comedy-slasher horror film. It was directed by Brian Katkin, with the screenplay by John Huckert and Dan Acre, from a story by Huckert, Acre and Damian Akhavi. The film, 86 minutes long and rated R, was released through New Concorde.

It was the last film shot at Roger Corman's studios in Venice Beach, California, and it only had a 12-day shooting schedule. The studio was being torn down during the production.

The film began life as a remake of Slumber Party Massacre, and writers John Huckert and Dan Acre were hired to pen the script. But after visiting the soon-to-be-demolished studio they came up with this idea instead. Producer Damien Akhavi helped them write the story. Footage from the original Slumber Party Massacre can still be seen during a murder sequence as an in-joke for the production crew.

Though principal photography took place in February 2001, the final sequences were not filmed until July 2002. The long break was necessitated by the fact that the scenes were to be shot in Malibu, but the rainfall was unusually heavy, so the completion of the film was postponed. Director Katkin shot another film during the break in this movie's production.

== Plot ==
The film begins with an egotistical film student named Steve (Stanovich) recounting to his girlfriend Madigan (Shelton-White) the history of Slaughter Studios. As a child he adored the horror movies that were produced there, but the studio closed down twenty years ago after an actor named Justin Kirkpatric was accidentally killed during a film shoot.

The next day Steve tells Madigan and some of his fellow students that he wants to use the abandoned studio to film one last horror movie. The catch is that the studio is being torn down the next day, meaning that they only have 9 hours to shoot the entire feature-length picture, whose script is titled Naughty Sex Kittens vs. the Giant Praying Mantis. One of Steve's friends, Trish (Frajko), says that some of the girls in her acting class would probably love to do it. Steve selects a young actor named Kevin (Read) to play the monster, and Madigan will be the production assistant, though she would much prefer to act in the movie, though Steve refuses to give her a part.

Later that night Steve and Madigan arrive at the studio, and they are introduced to the cast...snotty Portia (Killian), dim-witted Rebecca (Otis), floozy Darlene (Ellison), airhead Candace (McComas), and Chad (Keefe), who is playing the leading role. Also helping out is Olie (Chulani), who is there to work as the sound department. Steve explains to them that they have to be careful because every hour the security guard will do his rounds. They break into the studio (accidentally disturbing a homeless man in the process) and begin to set up for the shoot. It turns out that Chad is a truly lousy actor, so Steve sends him off to a secluded room to practice his lines so he will not disturb anyone. While going over his lines by himself a shadowy figure sneaks up behind him and kills him with a pick ax.

Believing that Chad decided to leave, Steve casts Olie as the leading man. Steve also improvises a lesbian sex scene to be included in the film, and gets Darlene and Rebecca to agree to it. The two become so excited during the scene that they end up actually having sex. Following this the two women go off to shower to clean themselves up; while finding their way back to the set they are murdered.

Steve is becoming increasingly agitated due to the disappearances and high levels of his stress medications. Madigan is finally able to secure a part in the movie because of the shortage of actors, and she and Kevin become attracted to one another. During this time Candace wanders off by herself to look for the ghost of Justin Kirkpatric (she is obsessed with him) and is killed. While getting ready for her next scene, Trish is strangled to death by the unknown assailant, but unbeknownst to the murderer, her death is recorded by a hidden video camera.

Madigan finds the hidden camera and confronts Steve with it, thinking that he had hidden it in the women's dressing room on purpose. It turns out the camera belongs to Olie, who was hoping to sell the footage to an online porn site for some extra money. Olie decides to leave the studio for fear of facing Madigan's wrath, but on his way out he runs into the security guard, who chases him back into the studio.

Steve has Gary (Roseman), the cameraman, hook up Olie's camera to a television to see if they can use any of its footage, whereupon they stumble across Trish's recorded death. Madigan realizes that there is someone hiding in the studio with them, and that this person has probably butchered everyone who has disappeared. Gary, Kevin, and Madigan all think it is best to leave, but Steve, who by now is half crazed with drugs and fear, is only concerned about completing his film. Meanwhile, Olie has discovered the bodies of Rebecca and Darlene and is being chased by the killer, who dispatches him with a spike through the head.

Portia, who is unaware of the evening's events because she was passed out after taking too much of Steve's stress medication, comes to and is angered when Kevin refuses to sleep with her. She storms off by herself.

Gary, meanwhile, has become separated from the others and is decapitated. Likewise, a delirious Steve has stumbled back to the sound stage and is crushed to death when the killer drops a piece of heavy equipment on him. Kevin and Madigan come across the security guard, who proceeds to chase them throughout the studio. Believing him to be the killer, they escape via car, but the guard gives chase. The two eventually overpower him, and it is discovered that he is not the murderer. In fact, he is the actor who inadvertently killed Justin Kirkpatric twenty years earlier. The three realize that the killer is still inside the studio...and so is Portia.

Back at the set Portia is trying to find the others when the killer impales her. It is then that the murderer is finally revealed to be the homeless man that the students scared off earlier in the evening. He says, "It ain't right to fuck with a man's house." Beside him sits the ghost of Justin Kirkpatric, who shares his sentiment.

== Cast ==
- Nicolas Read as Kevin
- Amy Shelton-White as Madigan
- Tara Killian as Portia
- Peter Stanovich as Steve
- Anand Chulani as Ollie
- Eva Frajko as Trisha
- Matthew Roseman as Gary
- Laura Otis as Rebecca
- Darren Keefe as Chad Daniels (credited as Darren Reiher)
- Serra Ellison as Darlene
- Lorissa McComas as Candace

=== Unused ending ===
Director Katkin and composer Christopher Farrell state on the DVD commentary that the ending as originally written revealed the night's events were actually part of a film that was being shot at the studio, therefore the whole movie was a film within a film (within a film), and none of the preceding events were real. The film originally ended with a director yelling Cut! and the crew applauding. Katkin filmed this ending but didn't like it and edited it out.
