= Barbary Coast (musical) =

1978 musical

- Music: William Penzner
- Lyrics: William Penzner
- Book: William Penzner
- Productions: 1978 San Francisco

Barbary Coast is a musical that opened at the Orpheum Theatre in San Francisco on February 28, 1978.

== Background ==
William Penzner, author of the unproduced The Count of Ten, was looking for a Broadway transfer, and had put somewhere between $700,000 to one million of his own money producing the show. The show opened on February 28, 1978 at the Orpheum Theatre and closed on March 11, 1978. It was later staged with Eddie Bracken, at the Fisher Theatre, in Detroit in 1983.

== Plot ==
The story follows pugilist and saloon owner James J. Corbett and his romance with Nob Hill debutante Cynthia Carter. The story takes place from 1897 to 1906 in San Francisco, and featured a moving cable car on stage, a ballet battle of the Tong Wars, and the 1906 San Francisco earthquake.

== Cast and crew ==
The show was directed by Jack Bunch, choreography Ed Nolfi, set design William Morris, costume design Madeline Graneto, lighting design Martin Aronstein, and musical direction Joseph Stecko.

The cast featured Jerry Lanning (James J. Corbett), Marcia Rodd (Cynthia Carter), Ben Wrigley (Biff Mahoney), Lette Rehnolds (Princezz Zara), Gillian Scalici (Rita Lorraine), Philip Kenneally (Trainer, Officer Miority), Dan Ferrone (Rod Van de Vere), Sab Shimono (Captain Chung), Michael Byers (Lee Matson), Lola Fisher (Mrs. Mary R. Carter), Chao-Li Chi (Bing Lu Lee), Timm Fujii (Kim), Jack Driscoll (Joe Choynski), Marnie Mosiman (Lillian Russell, Ensemble), Michael Magnusen (Dispatcher, Reporter, Ensemble), Charles Spoerri (Referee, Ensemble), Roxann Pyle (Carrie Nation, Cabaret Girl, Ensemble), M.G. Hawkins (C. Barrington Fairchild, Reporter, Cabaret Girl, Ensemble), Richard Laster (Organ Grinder, Ensemble), Helena Andreyko (Cabaret Girl, Ensemble), Cynthia DeVore (Cabaret Girl, Ensemble), Mary Ann Dunroe (Cabaret Girl, Ensemble), Spence Ford (Cabaret Girl, Ensemble), Alyson Reed (Cabaret Girl, Ensemble), Lynne Savage (Cabaret Girl, Ensemble), Jeffrey Reynolds (Reporter, Ensemble), James Whitson (Reporter, Ensemble). The ensemble featured James D Armstrong, Eileen Duffy, Catherine Fiasca, Terry Iten, Carla Manning, Brad Maule, Brian Taylor, Leslie Tinnaro, Kathy Vestuto, John Addis, Ron Cisneros, Denny Martin Flinn, Shuan Soo Lee, Ricky Schussel, Wilfredo Suarez, and a monkey named Charlie.

== Songs ==
Act I

- Overture – Orchestra
- "You're on the Barbary Coast" – Biff, Ensemble
- "The Fight" – Jim, Joe, Fans
- "Everybody Loves A Winner" – Fans
- "They Struck Her Name from the Blue Book Set 'Cause She Made Headlines in the Pink Police Gazette" – Cynthia, Ensemble
- "Love, Love, Love" – Rita, Cabaret Girls
- "Pink Police Gazette" – Cynthia, Lillian, Rita, Ensemble
- "The Count of Ten" – Jim
- "Love is Everything" – Biff, Zara, Lee, Rita, Ensemble
- "There's Nothing Stranger Than Love" – Jim, Cynthia
- "Love is Everything (reprise)" – Jim, Cynthia, Ensemble
- "Monkey Dance" – Biff, Charlie
- "Happy Time Rag" – Dancers, Ensemble
- "Is It Love or Fascination" – Zara, Jim, Cynthia, Ensemble
- "Without You There Is No Me" – Cynthia
- "The Count of Ten (reprise)" – Jim, Reporters, Trainer
- "When Miss Park Avenue Does the Bumps" – Cynthia, Bing

Act II

- Entr'acte – Orchestra
- "The Tong War" – Cynthia, Jim, Biff, Kim, Officer Miority, Captain Chung, Chinese Tongs
- "There's Nothing Stranger Than Love (reprise)" - Jim, Cynthia
- "I Can See It All" – Zara, Rod, Biff
- "Gentleman Jim" – Biff, Trainer, Bing, Zara, Cabaret Girls, Ensemble
- "When You Dance With The One You Love (reprise)" – Jim, Cynthia, Ensemble
- "How Long Can A Heart Go On Loving" – Cynthia
- "Barbary Coast" – Biff, Carrie
- "Searching" – Jim
- "Ride, Ride, Ride" – Cabaret Girls
- "Go, Don't Want To Love You No More" – Rita, Bing, Cabaret Girls
- "You're On The Barbary Coast (reprise)" – Rita, Cabaret Girls
- "Searching (reprise)" – Jim, Cynthia
- "Love Is Everything (reprise)" – Company
