= No-No Boy (play) =

2010 play by Ken Narasaki

- World Premiere poster
- Original language: English
- Written by: Ken Narasaki
- Characters: Ichiro; Ma; Pa; Kenji; Emi; Freddie; Taro; Eto; Mrs. Kanno; Jun
- Subject: World War II Draft resistance, Asian American family
- Genre: Drama, Asian American theatre
- Setting: 1946; Seattle

Premiere
- Date: March 27, 2010
- Place: Miles Memorial Playhouse Santa Monica, California

No-No Boy (2010) is a play written by Ken Narasaki adapted from the novel of the same title by John Okada, originally produced at the Miles Memorial Playhouse in Santa Monica, California, in association with Timescape Arts Group. It is a drama in two acts. (Each act was approximately 50 minutes in length and there was a 15-minute intermission.) The play was directed by Alberto Isaac, and received its world premiere on Saturday, March 27, 2010. (There was a preview on Friday, March 26, 2010 and it closed on Sunday, April 18, 2010.) The story follows a Japanese American World War II draft resister as he returns home from prison, in 1946.

== Play summary ==
Set after World War II as Japanese Americans return to the West Coast, the play follows draft resister Ichiro Yamada after he is released from prison and struggles to come to terms with his choices while his the community tries to rebuild after a war that has moved them all.

== Characters ==
- Ichiro Yamada: Nisei draft resister
- Pa: Ichiro's father, Issei
- Ma: Ichiro's mother, Issei
- Kenji Kanno: wounded 442 vet
- Emi: wife of enlisted soldier
- Freddie: Ichiro's buddy, also a draft resister
- Eto: veteran
- Taro: Ichiro's younger brother
- Mrs. Kanno: Kenji's mother
- Mr. Kumasaka: friend of the Yamada family
- Jun: veteran, friend of the Kumasaka's
- 2A: neighbor of Freddie
- Cop

== World premiere company ==
Miles Memorial Playhouse, 1130 Lincoln Blvd, Santa Monica, CA 90403; Opened March 27, 2010; Closed April 18, 2010.

=== Original cast ===
(in order of appearance)

- Ichiro – Robert Wu
- Eto / Jun – Chris Tashima
- Taro – Jared Asato
- Pa – Sab Shimono
- Ma – Sharon Omi
- Mr. Kumasaka / Cop – Ken Narasaki
- 2A / Mrs. Kanno – Emily Kuroda
- Freddie – John Miyasaki (March 26 - April 12); Mike Hagiwara (April 16–18)
- Kenji – Greg Watanabe
- Emi / Mrs.ka – Keiko Agena
- Understudy for Emi, 2A, Mrs. Kumasaka, Mrs. Kanno - Junko Goda

=== Setting ===
- Seattle, 1946.

=== Production staff ===
- Director – Alberto Isaac
- Choreographer – Michael Hagiwara
- Fight Choreographer – Aaron Pagel
- Set Design – Alan E. Muraoka
- Costume designer – Ken Takemoto
- Lighting designer – Jeremy Pivnick
- Sound Design/Music Composition – Dave Iwataki
- Projection Design – John J. Flynn
- Property Master – Ken Takemoto
- Stage Manager – Darlene Miyakawa

== Controversy ==
The ending of the play has received criticism due to the uplifting tone of Ken Narasaki's rewrite, compared to Okada's original, bleak ending. By the end of the original novel, Ichiro is walking down a street alone and conflicted, having just seen Freddie, a fellow No-No Boy, die in a car crash while fleeing from a fight with a Nisei veteran. The documentary director Frank Abe describes the stage play's alterations to the plot: "Instead, after a brief knife fight, Freddie escapes. Ichiro goes out dancing — a scene from earlier in the book, with Emi the abandoned wife...Ichiro and Emi kiss. They are going to live happily ever after, doggone it. It's a theatrical moment. It's probably very moving in performance. It's also schmaltz. And It's very wrong." Frank Chin, whose afterword was printed in subsequent editions of "No-No Boy" after having helped republish the novel following Okada's death, was also critical of the rewrite. Chin quipped that, "Car crashes and death are too difficult" to be a part of the Asian American stage, and said of Narasaki's changes, "If you don't like Okada, stay out of his bathroom, bedroom, stay out of his house, get out of his fucking book. Just leave it alone." Chin and Narasaki wrote back and forth, as documented by Chin, with Narasaki of the belief that the deceased Okada would not be so harsh about the changes to his work, and said of Chin that, "You, who were once a life force that helped spawn so many Asian American theater artists have now become a poison determined to kill your fellow artists because they are not you."

== Reviews ==
- 4/1/10 review by Paul Birchall for LA Weekly
- 4/16/10 student review by Jennifer Ta for Daily Bruin

== See also ==
- List of plays with anti-war themes
