= James Keegan =

Irish hurler

Personal information
- Born: Cork, Ireland

Sport
- Sport: Hurling
- Position: Forward
Club
- Years: Club
- 1880s-1890s: Redmonds
Club titles
- Cork titles: 1
Inter-county
Years	County	Apps (scores)
1892	Cork	2
Inter-county titles
- Munster titles: 1
- All-Irelands: 1

James Keegan (born 1869 in Cork, Ireland) was an Irish sportsperson. He played hurling with his local club Redmonds and was a member of the Cork senior inter-county team for one season in 1892.

== Playing career ==
=== Club ===
Keegan played his club hurling with the famous Redmonds club and enjoyed some success. He won a county senior championship title in 1892.

=== Inter-county ===
Keegan first came to prominence on the inter-county scene with Cork as part of the Redmonds selection in 1892. That year he lined out in his first provincial decider with All-Ireland champions Kerry providing the opposition. The game became exciting, but full-time Cork were the champions by 5–3 to 2–5. It was Keegan's first and only Munster title. Cork's next game was an All-Ireland final meeting with Dublin. The game was controversial when referee Dan Fraher awarded a goal to Cork. Fraher would decide that the GAA's Central Council should decide the matter. Dublin had forfeited the game when they walked off the field, and Cork were awarded the title, giving Keegan an All-Ireland championship title.

== Sources ==
- Corry, Eoghan, The GAA Book of Lists (Hodder Headline Ireland, 2005).
- Cronin, Jim, A Rebel Hundred: Cork's 100 All-Ireland Titles.
- Donegan, Des, The Complete Handbook of Gaelic Games (DBA Publications Limited, 2005).
