= John Huckert =

American filmmaker (born 1954)

- Born: June 26, 1954 (age 72)
- Occupations: Film director, producer, screenwriter
- Notable work: Hard

John Huckert (born June 26, 1954) is an American filmmaker.

== Partial filmography ==
- The Passing (1983) - Director, co-producer, co-writer
- Hard (1998) - Director, co-producer, co-writer
- Slaughter Studios (2002) - Co-writer
- Shakedown (2002) - Co-writer
- DinoCroc (2004) - Co-producer, co-writer
- Garden of Dreams (2005) - Director, co-writer
- Strangers Online (2010) - Director, co-producer, co-writer
- SWEAT (TV pilot, 2013) - "Created by"
