= Karen Narasaki =

American civil rights activist

Personal details
- Born: April 4, 1958 (age 68) Seattle, Washington, U.S.
- Party: Democratic
- Education: Yale University (BA); University of California, Los Angeles (JD)

Karen K. Narasaki (born April 4, 1958) is an American civil rights leader and human rights activist. She most recently served as a Commissioner on the United States Commission on Civil Rights after President Barack Obama appointed her in July 2014. She is the former president and executive director of Asian Americans Advancing Justice (AAJC). Asian Americans Advancing Justice (AAJC) is a Washington, D.C.–based, nonprofit, nonpartisan, civil rights organization whose mission is to advance the human and civil rights of Asian Pacific Americans through advocacy, public policy, public education and litigation. Prior to her post at AAJC, she served as the Washington, D.C. representative to the Japanese American Citizens League. Narasaki has also served as the chairperson of the National Council of Asian Pacific Americans and as the chairwoman of the Asian Pacific American Media Coalition.

== Early life and education ==
Narasaki was born in Seattle, Washington. She is the twin sister of playwright and actor Ken Narasaki. Both of her parents, who were born in the U.S., were imprisoned in internment camps during WWII. She became interested in civil rights when at age eight she accidentally overheard the pained voices of her parents discussing where their family would live next. Although her father was a second generation Japanese American, served in the famed 442nd Regimental Combat Team of the U.S. Army, the all-Japanese American unit that fought in Europe during World War II, and an engineer at Boeing, racial covenants in Seattle of the time prevented him from buying a house for his family. After graduating magna cum laude from Yale University and Order of the Coif from the UCLA school of law, Narasaki worked as a corporate attorney at Perkins Coie in Seattle. While at the firm, Narasaki moonlighted as a civil rights activist at Asian American and women’s rights groups.

== Career in advocacy ==
In 1986, Narasaki left corporate work to enter the nonprofit sector as an advocate for human and civil rights. She has a long history of civil rights activism. Under Narasaki’s leadership, AAJC – which is affiliated with the Asian American Institute in Chicago, the Asian Pacific American Legal Center in Los Angeles, and the Asian Law Caucus in San Francisco – led the passage of the reauthorizations of key provisions of the Voting Rights Act of 1965. In doing so, AAJC helped unite African American, Latino, Native American and other stakeholders to identify the necessary research, while organizing testimony, training organizers and educating the public about the continuing existence of discriminatory barriers and behavior in voting.

=== Television diversity ===
As former chair of the Asian Pacific American Media Coalition, Narasaki is also an advocate for television diversity on behalf of Asian Americans. She serves as a member of the Asian Pacific American Advisory Council, a group of community, civic and business leaders who advise Nielsen Media Research, an international provider of television audience measurement services, on reaching out to Asian Americans. Through AAJC, Narasaki also issues an annual report card on the diversity efforts of major television networks, including NBC, ABC, CBS and Fox. These initiatives have led to more than a 20 percent increase for both regular and recurring roles for Asian Pacific Americans on prime-time television shows - both on and off-camera.

=== Immigrant and civil rights ===
In addition, Narasaki serves in a number of leadership positions in the civil rights and immigrant rights communities. In her early work for the Japanese American Citizens League (JACL), she helped increase language assistance provisions in the Voting Rights Act to help new American citizens, including elderly Asian Americans, vote. She is vice chair of the Leadership Conference on Civil Rights, the national civil rights coalition and as vice president of the Coalition for Comprehensive Immigration Reform and chair of the Rights Working Group, a coalition of human rights, civil rights, civil liberties and immigrant rights advocates working together to address the deterioration of civil and human rights in the aftermath of 9/11. She also serves on the national governing board of Common Cause, the board of the Lawyers' Committee for Civil Rights Under Law, the Leadership Conference on Civil Rights Education Fund, and is a past board member of the Independent Sector.

Narasaki also serves on the National Commission on Adult Literacy, a national project of the Council for Advancement of Adult Literacy which promotes adult literacy and is the immediate past chair of the National Council of Asian Pacific Americans.

A nationally recognized expert on affirmative action and immigrant, civil and voting rights Narasaki has appeared on The Newshour with Jim Lehrer, ABC and CBS News, Hardball with Chris Matthews and has been quoted in many major American newspapers. During the Clinton administration, Narasaki was invited to the White House on several occasions to advise the president on civil rights issues. On April 22, 2009 she was named to the Advisory Committee on Diversity for Communications in the Digital Age of the Federal Communications Commission.

=== Awards ===
Recognized by Washingtonian Magazine in 2001, 2006, 2009 and 2011 as one of the "100 most powerful women in Washington, D.C.," Narasaki has received numerous awards and accolades. In 2005, she was the recipient of the American Bar Association Spirit of Excellence Award, and has received the Congressional Black Caucus Chair's Award, International Channel We the People Award, and was named one of the 100 Most Influential Asian Americans of the Decade by A. Magazine. Along with numerous other awards, she is also the 2004 recipient of the Greater Sacramento Urban League Ruth Standish Baldwin Award, the 2000 U.S. Department of Justice Citizen Volunteer Service Award, the 1999 Asian Pacific American Labor Alliance Community Award, and the 1994 National Asian Pacific American Bar Association Trailblazer Award.

== Bibliography ==
- "I, Too, Am an Affirmative-Action Baby". Essence. October 1, 1997. Archived from the original on January 16, 2010.
- "U.S. Should Take Leadership Role in Racial Justice". St. Paul Pioneer Press. August 16, 2001. Archived from the original on November 21, 2006.
