= Michael O'Brien (Canadian author) =

Canadian Christian academic and writer (born 1948)

- Born: Michael David O'Brien; 1948 (age 77–78); Ottawa
- Occupations: Author; essayist; lecturer

Michael David O'Brien (born 1948) is a Canadian author, artist, and essayist and lecturer on faith and culture.

Born in Ottawa, he is self-taught, without an academic background. He writes and speaks on Catholic themes and topics, and creates the cover art for his novels in a neo-Byzantine style. He lives with his family in Combermere, Ontario, Canada.

O'Brien's books have been published in a number of foreign languages, including Croatian, Czech, French, German, Italian, Lithuanian, Polish, Spanish, Portuguese and Swedish.

== Early life ==
O'Brien was born in Ottawa and lived in Kugluktuk (then known as Coppermine) from ages 12 to 16. He attended a residential school in Inuvik, where he says he was abused by a dormitory supervisor. He graduated from grade 12 at St Patrick's College High School only with difficulty. As a youth, he was agnostic, leaning towards atheism, until his conversion to Catholicism when he was 21. He began to draw and paint shortly after, and had a successful gallery exhibition. Five years later, at the urging of his wife, he began to turn his artwork towards religious subjects. In 1994, at the age of 46, he began to write.

== Works ==
=== Fiction ===
- The Small Angel (White Horse Press, 1996)
- Island of the World (Ignatius Press, 2007) – Josip Lasta is the son of an impoverished school teacher in a remote village high in Bosnia and Herzegovina.
- Waiting: Stories for Advent (Justin Press, 2010, ISBN 9780981318455)
- Theophilos (Ignatius Press, 2010) – Historical fiction centred on Theophilos, here portrayed as the adoptive father of St. Luke the Evangelist.
- Winter Tales (Justin Press, 2011)
- The Father's Tale. A novel (Ignatius Press, 2011) – Canadian bookseller Alex Graham is a middle-age widower whose quiet life is turned upside down when his college-age son disappears without any explanation or trace of where he has gone. With minimal resources, the father begins a long journey that takes him for the first time away from his safe and orderly world.
- Voyage to Alpha Centauri (Ignatius Press, 2013) – Set eighty years in the future, an expedition is sent from the planet Earth to Alpha Centauri, the star closest to the Solar System. The Kosmos, a great ship that the central character Neil de Hoyos describes as a "flying city", is immense in size and capable of more than half light-speed. Hoyos, a Nobel Prize–winning physicist who has played a major role in designing the ship, signs on as a passenger.
- The Fool of New York City (Ignatius Press, 2016)
- The Lighthouse (Ignatius Press, 2020)
- The Sabbatical (Ignatius Press, 2021)
- By the Rivers of Babylon (Ignatius Press, 2022)
- Letter to the Future (Ignatius Press, 2025)

Children of the Last Days series

- Father Elijah: An Apocalypse (Ignatius Press, 1996), tells the story of a Jewish Holocaust survivor named David Schäfer who converts to Catholicism, becomes a Carmelite priest and takes the name Father Elijah. The novel includes depictions of a prefect for the Congregation for the Doctrine of the Faith who resembles Joseph Ratzinger and a Pope who resembles Pope John Paul II. The fictional Pope tasks Father Elijah with a secret mission: to confront the Antichrist, bring him to repentance and thus postpone the Great Tribulation. One of the Antichrist's intrigues involves the discovery of Aristotle's lost work, On Justice.
- Strangers and Sojourners (Ignatius Press, 1997) – An agnostic Englishwoman and Catholic Irishman both flee from their pasts to Canada in the 1930s, where they live out their lives as "Strangers and Sojourners in a foreign land ..."
- Eclipse of the Sun (Ignatius Press, 1998) – A priest and a child are hunted across northwest Canada by an increasingly totalitarian government and the forces of evil.
- Plague Journal (Ignatius Press, 1999) – Set in Canada, it is written in the form of the diary of a Catholic newsletter editor who is framed for murder by the forces of the Antichrist.
- A Cry of Stone (Ignatius Press, 2003) – Rose Wâbos, abandoned as an infant, is raised by her grandmother, Oldmary Wâbos, in the remotest regions of the northern Ontario wilderness. The story covers a period from 1940 to 1973, chronicling Rose's growth to womanhood, her discovery of art, her moving out into the world of cities and sophisticated cultural circles.
- Sophia House (Ignatius Press, 2005) – Depicts the experiences of the young David Schäfer/Fr. Elijah while being sheltered by Pawel Tarnowski, a Polish Catholic during the Second World War.
- Elijah in Jerusalem (Ignatius Press, 2015) – A sequel to Father Elijah.

=== Non-fiction ===
O'Brien's articles and lectures focus on his belief that Western civilization is in severe decline as well as heading towards a "New Totalitarianism". A significant amount of his writing appeared first in Nazareth Journal, of which he was founding editor.

O'Brien's book A Landscape with Dragons: The Battle for Your Child's Mind – described as controversial by its publisher – presents his concern that contemporary children's literature and culture has strayed from Christian ethics to a more pagan ideology where good and evil is not strongly defined. The book features O'Brien's examination of fantasy works ranging from C. S. Lewis's The Chronicles of Narnia and J. R. R. Tolkien's The Lord of the Rings to Anne McCaffrey's Dragonriders of Pern. One of the book's central claims is that any story in which dragons are presented sympathetically rather than as forces of evil is implicitly anti-Christian because of the traditional use of the dragon as a symbol for Satan.

O'Brien has been critical of J. K. Rowling's Harry Potter series, comparing it unfavourably with the work of Tolkien.

O'Brien's non-fiction works include:

- The Mysteries of the Most Holy Rosary (meditations and paintings, White Horse Press, 1992, Ignatius Press, 1994 ISBN 9780969639107)
- A Landscape with Dragons: The Battle for Your Child's Mind (Ignatius Press, 1994, ISBN 9780898706789)
- Remembrance of the Future: Reflections on Our Times (Justin Press, 2009)
- Arriving Where We Started: Faith and Culture in the Postmodernist Age (Justin Press, 2011, ISBN 9780987780553, re-titled Father at Night)
- William Kurelek: Painter & Prophet (Justin Press, 2013 ISBN 9780991934218)
- (with Matthew [Maté] Krajina) Donkey Dialogues (Justin Press, 2014, ISBN 9780991934249)
- Stations of the Cross: Paintings and Meditations (Justin Press, 2018, ISBN 9781988165097
- The Apocalypse: Warning, Hope & Consolation (Wiseblood Books, 2018, ISBN 9780991583232)
- The Family & the New Totalitarianism (essays, Divine Providence Press, 2019, ISBN 9780991583263)
- (with Clemens Cavallin) The Art of Michael D. O'Brien (Ignatius Press, 2020, ISBN 9781621642770)

== Publishers ==
Much of O'Brien's non-fiction, and some of his fiction, has been published by Justin Press, a Catholic publishing house in Ottawa founded in 2009. The majority of his fiction, and some of his non-fiction, has been published by Ignatius Press, a Catholic publishing house founded in 1974 in San Francisco.

Other books by O'Brien have been published by Wiseblood Books and one of its imprints, Divine Providence Press.

== Acknowledgements ==
- Andrija Buvina Prize, awarded at the 2005 Christian Culture Days in Split
