= Yellow Face (film) =

- Directed by: Han Tang
- Produced by: Han Tang
- Release date: 2010
- Running time: 45 minutes
- Country: United States
- Language: English

Yellow Face is a 2010 independent documentary film directed by Han Tang about the big-budget feature film The Last Airbender and its use of Yellowface and casting of white actors in the Asian inspired lead roles of the film and the controversy that surrounds that issue.

== Synopsis ==
Yellow Face is one Chinese actress' journey to discover what it means to be "Asian" in America. The filmmaker is the first Chinese National to be accepted into the Juilliard School's Drama Division. Since her graduation in 2008 she has followed the protest against 'Yellow Face' in Hollywood. Avatar: The Last Airbender, a children's show on Nickelodeon, featured Asian and Inuit characters in a fantasy setting. The creators of the show were inspired and informed by Asian and Inuit culture. The live action feature 'The Last Airbender' produced by Paramount cast all three leads white, and filled background roles and non-speaking extras with Asian, Hispanic and Middle Eastern nationalities. Although the 'Yellow Face' casting outraged many fans, others remain at peace with it. The filmmaker raises these questions: Is Whitewashing Racist? Why does 'Yellow Face' still exist in 2009? And this idea of what's 'Asian' in America today, is it racist? And what is the societal impact on future generations?

== Content ==
The film starts out discussing and exploring the history of Yellow Face in the American media and its relation to Blackface and media perceptions of Asians in America today.

Throughout the film explores the issue of whitewashing of Asian Americans throughout the American media as well as other minority races in American society leading to the accumulation of Hollywood's modern day use of Yellow Face and thus its use in the film The Last Airbender. Other than exploring the controversy of the use of Yellow Face in The Last Airbender and its casting of white actors in the films Lead roles the film also interviews various individuals, discuss, and explore various Asian American issues. Such issues that arise in the film are as follows: Restriction of Minority actors as a form of Job Protection for White actors and its relation to Asian actors in America, the Marginalization of Asian American history in the American education system, internment of Japanese Americans, the rejection of World War II Filipino veterans benefits and their denial of U.S. citizenship, internalization of racism and its impact on Asian American children as well as other minority races due to the emphasis and the subliminal messaging of white superiority in the American media, the questioning of who and what is the American family and its exclusion of Asian Americans, the consequences of the belief of a post-racial society, the Chinese Exclusion Act, the perpetual foreigner stereotype of Asians in America, the consequences of the Model Minority stereotype and its creation in the 1960s during the social climate of the Civil Rights Movement.

The film ends with a slide show of showcasing various pictures of famous actors who have performed in Yellowface in films throughout Early Hollywood all the way until recently with The Last Airbender and afterwards it shows upcoming big-budget Hollywood films that will and or might be using Yellowface in their productions.

== Cast ==
- Han Tang – Herself, director
- Phil Hutchison – Himself, Faculty Asian American Studies CSUN
- Cynthia Lee – Herself, Curator and Director of Exhibitions Museum of Chinese in America

== See also ==
- Portrayal of East Asians in Hollywood
