= No-No Boy =

1957 novel by Japanese-American writer John Okada

- First edition
- Author: John Okada
- Language: English
- Genre: Historical fiction
- Set in: Seattle, Washington (1946)
- Publisher: Tuttle Publishing, University of Washington Press
- Publication date: 1957
- Publication place: United States; Japan
- Media type: Print
- Pages: 260
- ISBN: 0295955252
- OCLC: 2945142

No-No Boy is the only novel published by the Japanese American writer John Okada. Published in 1957, it tells the story of a Japanese-American in the aftermath of the internment of Japanese Americans during World War II. Set in Seattle, Washington, in 1946, the novel is written in the voice of an omniscient narrator who frequently blends into the voice of the protagonist.

Though largely unknown during Okada's lifetime, the book was rediscovered and championed by later Asian-American writers. It has since seen widespread success, selling over 100,000 copies, inspiring a stage adaptation, and becoming one of the most highly regarded Asian-American novels.

== Background ==
After the attack on Pearl Harbor on December 7th, 1941, all citizens of Japanese ancestry were classified as 4-C, "enemy aliens", and denied entry into the armed forces. In spring 1942, the American government began removing Japanese and Japanese American families from their homes and sending them to live in remote internment camps.

As the war continued, the need for more soldiers increased. In 1943, the War Department, along with the War Relocation Authority (WRA) created a test for adults and teens in the WRA camps known as the "Leave Clearance Application Form," also known as the loyalty questionnaire. The first form was aimed at draft-aged Nisei males and the second form at all other residents.

The last two questions, numbers 27 and 28--where affirmative answers signaled unwavering loyalty to the U.S. - created confusion and resentment. The two questions read as follows:

- "Are you willing to serve in the armed forces of the United States on combat duty wherever ordered?"
- "Will you swear unqualified allegiance to the United States of America and faithfully defend the United States from any or all attack by foreign or domestic forces, and forswear any form of allegiance or obedience to the Japanese emperor, to any other foreign government, power or organization?"

Both questions were confusing to many respondents. Regarding the first, some respondents thought that by answering yes, they were signing up for combat duty in segregated units, expected to fight while their families continued to be confined in the camps. Others, given their forced removal and incarceration, said no to resist the draft because their constitutional rights were being violated. To many respondents, most of whom were American citizens, the second question implied that the respondent had already sworn allegiance to the Japanese emperor. They saw the second question as a trap and rejected the premise by answering no. Out of principle or uncertainty, many answered no to both questions.

Afterwards, all who answered "no" to one or both questions, or who gave an affirmative answer but qualified it with statements like "I'll serve in the military after my family is freed", were sent to the Tule Lake Segregation Center--these men were colloquially called "no-no boys." Approximately 300 young men served time in federal prison for refusing to join the military from camp.

== Plot ==
In 1946, Japanese-American Ichiro Yamada returns home to Seattle after spending two years in prison for refusing to enlist in the army. While he answered "No" to both questions and refused to serve, he feels disconnected from his Japanese heritage and struggles to identify with America.

Ichiro’s mother, referred to only as Mama, is a staunch nationalist who takes pride in Ichiro’s refusal to serve. She insists that Japan has won the war and believes any reports to the contrary are American propaganda. His father, Papa, retreats into alcoholism to avoid confronting his wife; he is especially troubled by her refusal to send any supplies to their family in Japan as she believes that all their letters are forgeries. After leaving their internment camp, the two purchased a grocery store where they now live and work. Meanwhile, Ichiro’s brother, Taro, intends to enlist in the army out of shame for his brother’s actions.

Ichiro rekindles friendships with Freddie, a Japanese American who similarly refused to serve, and Kenji, who fought for the US. Wounded in the war, Kenji suffers from a severe infection in his leg that has already required several amputations. He predicts that the remainder of his leg will rot, killing him. The two go to Club Oriental, a bar for Asian Americans, many of whom served in the war and now resent Ichiro. Taro and his friends lure Ichiro into an ambush, striking him and shouting racist abuse. Kenji intervenes to protect Ichiro.

Kenji introduces Ichiro to Emi, a fellow Japanese American. During the war, Kenji served alongside her husband who later re-enlisted out of shame for his brother’s decision to remain loyal to Japan. Kenji wants Ichiro to sleep with Emi, believing that it would be best for her and her husband to divorce--Kenji also implies that he loves Emi but cannot be with her due to his condition.

A letter arrives from Mama’s sister containing several secrets from their childhood. Now realizing the letters must be real and that Japan has lost the war, she falls into a deep depression, refusing to eat and struggling to work.

Kenji, feeling pain returning to his leg, must go to Portland for surgery and asks Ichiro to accompany him. Once there, Ichiro considers staying in Portland. While looking for a job, he meets an engineer named Mr. Carrick who offers him a lucrative job as a draftsman out of sympathy. Still struggling with shame, Ichiro decides not to take the job.

The next day, Ichiro sneaks into the hospital to visit Kenji. With the infection rapidly progressing, he only has a few hours to live. Before he dies, he intends to write a letter to Emi’s husband accusing her of infidelity in hopes that it will drive him to either divorce her or return home. Kenji urges Ichiro to return to Seattle and help break down the boundaries of race in America; he particularly urges Ichiro to marry a non-Japanese woman.

Returning to Seattle, Ichiro informs Kenji’s father of his death before returning home. There, he finds that Mama has committed suicide while Papa has passed out drunk. In the ensuing days, Ichiro notes that Papa enjoys the attention he receives throughout the funeral; frustrated, he skips much of the proceedings.

Emi comes to Seattle to give her condolences to Ichiro. Since their last meeting, her husband sent her a letter stating his intent to divorce her, though she never learned what Kenji wrote to him. The two go out dancing; when Ichiro returns home, his father is preparing packages to send to his family in Japan.

Ichiro finds another job opportunity but declines it. Freddie invites Ichiro to join him for a night out. Despite Ichiro’s protestations, Freddie takes him to Club Oriental. The two fight an antagonizing veteran nicknamed Bull. After getting the upper hand, Ichiro nearly kills Bull before other patrons separate them. Freddie flees in his car but quickly crashes and dies. Bull begins to cry and Ichiro comforts him; reflecting on the episodes of tragedy and discrimination he has encountered, Ichiro feels a faint sense of hope for the future.

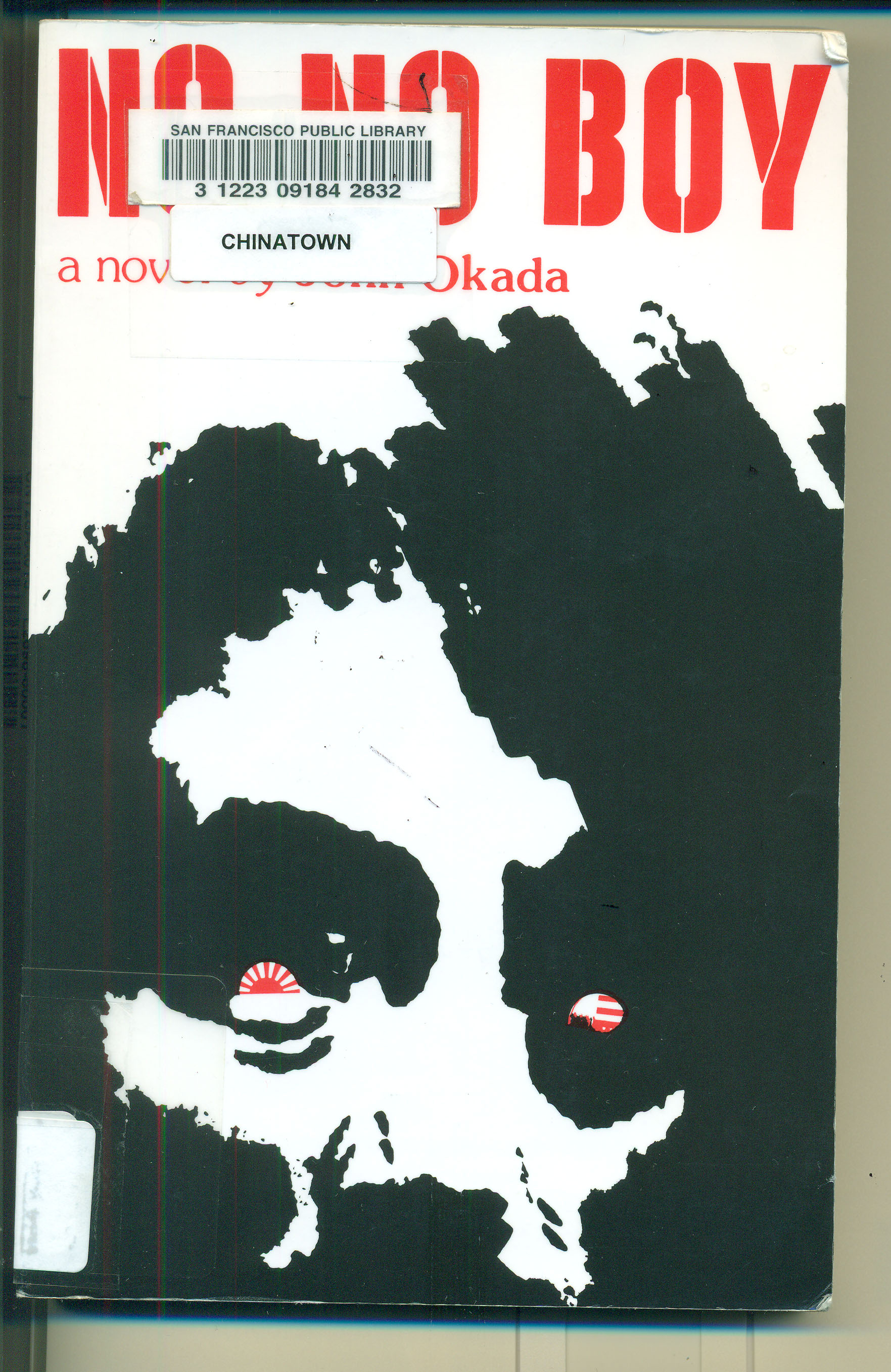
Front cover of the University of Washington Press 1976 edition of No-No Boy with Bob Onodera's design

== Publishing history and response ==
Following a string of rejections by American publishers, the Japanese publisher Charles E. Tuttle published an original run of 1,500 copies in 1957, which still had not sold out by the time Okada died in 1971. The initial response within the Japanese community was similar to that faced by the book's protagonist: ostracism for drawing attention to what was still perceived as disloyalty to the country and community.

Found in a used book store by Jeff Chan in 1970, he and fellow Asian-American writers Frank Chin, Lawson Fusao Inada and Shawn Wong reached out to the Okada estate to first try and meet with John Okada, then when they discovered that he had died, to acquire the rights to reissue the book under their Combined Asian-American Resources Project (CARP) label in 1976. CARP sold out two printings of 3,000 copies each before transferring the rights in 1979 to University of Washington Press. University of Washington Press has since sold over 157,000 copies of the book (as of 2019), including its most recent edition in 2014.

Penguin Random House published an edition of the novel in 2019, claiming that it was in the public domain and was never registered for copyright protection, sparking a controversy within the literary community for its failure to consult with the Okada estate and disregarding the struggle Okada and CARP had in attempting to publish the work. It has been asserted that when No-No Boy was first published in 1957, the Copyright Act of 1909 applied, which granted book authors 28 years of protection unless renewed by the copyright holder, for which CARP and the Okada estate failed to correctly apply. Both the UW Press and the Penguin editions remain in circulation, although Penguin has since withdrawn any advertising in regards to its printing and has removed mention of the book from its webpage.

== 2010 play adaptation ==
The novel was adapted as a stage play, also called No-No Boy, by Ken Narasaki. The play had its world premiere on 26 March 2010, at the Miles Memorial Playhouse in Santa Monica, California.
