= Ken Narasaki =

American playwright and actor (born 1958)

- Born: April 4, 1958 (age 68); Seattle, Washington, U.S.
- Occupations: Playwright, actor

Ken Narasaki (born April 4, 1958) is an American playwright and actor. He is the former Literary Manager at East West Players theatre company in Los Angeles. He is the twin brother of civil rights leader Karen Narasaki.

== Actor ==
Narasaki has appeared in a number of independent features including Jon Moritsugu's Terminal USA (1993), Chris Chan Lee's Yellow (1998), John Huckert's Hard (also in 1998) and Lane Nishikawa's Only the Brave (2006). Narasaki learned to speak German when he was cast as the lead in the German television series, Zwei Profis in 2002. He has appeared in over 65 plays in Seattle, San Francisco, Chicago, Los Angeles, and New York's Lincoln Center Theatre in the world premiere of Samuel D. Hunter's "Greater Clements", for which he was nominated for a Lucille Lortel award for featured actor in 2019.

== Playwright ==
Narasaki's Ghosts and Baggage was produced at the Los Angeles Theatre Center in 1998. Innocent When You Dream was produced in 2007 at the Electric Lodge in Venice, California and was performed at the Smithsonian Institution in 2008, as part of the "Day of Remembrance" of Executive Order 9066. The Mikado Project, co-written with Doris Baizley, was produced by Lodestone Theatre Ensemble at the Grove Center Theatre in Burbank, California in 2007. No-No Boy, adapted from the novel "No-No Boy" by John Okada, received its world premiere at the Miles Memorial Playhouse in Santa Monica, California in 2010. It went on to be produced by the Pan Asian Repertory Theatre at Theatre Row in 2014, and in Washington D.C. in 2016. No-No Boy, directed by Anna Lyse Erikson was a finalist for a 2022 Audie Award for Outstanding Drama. His Innocent When You Dream was also directed by Anna Lyse Erikson and produced by Los Angeles Theater Works in 2024.

=== Plays ===
- Ghosts and Baggage
- The Mikado Project - (co-written with Doris Baizley)
- Innocent When You Dream
- No-No Boy

=== Awards ===
- 2007 Kumu Kahua Theatre Pacific Rim Playwrights Award - Innocent When You Dream
- 2008 Pacific Rim Playwriting Award - The Mikado Project
- 2022 (finalist) Audie Award for Outstanding Drama
