= Lane Nishikawa =

American film director

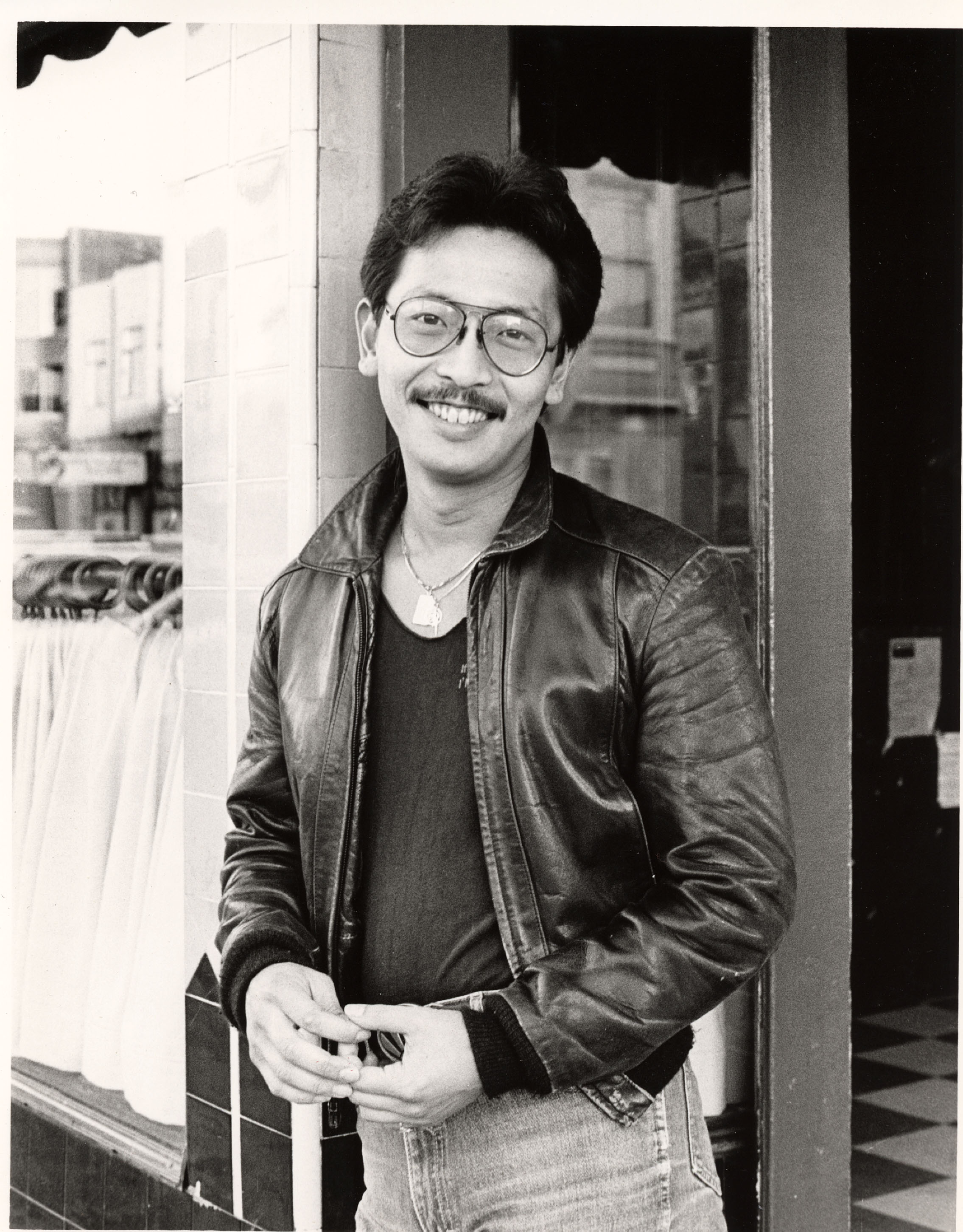
- Occupations: Novelist, playwright

Lane Nishikawa is a Japanese American actor, filmmaker, playwright and performance artist who was born in Wahiawa, Hawaii, and is Sansei (third generation Japanese American). His work often deals with Asian American history and identity issues. He is widely known for many one-man shows, including Life in the Fast Lane, I'm on a Mission From Buddha, Mifune and Me and others. In 2005 he directed and played the lead role for the independent feature film, Only the Brave, a fictional account of the rescue of the Lost Battalion by the 100th Infantry Battalion/442nd Regimental Combat Team. He has also written and directed two short films about World War II veterans, Forgotten Valor and When We Were Warriors.

Nishikawa has a long history in Asian-American theater, having served as artistic director for the Asian American Theater Company in San Francisco, California, for 10 seasons. He was co-artistic director of the Eureka Theatre and resident director at the San Francisco Shakespeare Festival.

== Honors ==
- Profiles of Excellence Award – ABC-TV
- Harvard Foundation Honoree
- Ruby Yoshino Schaar Playwright Award – National JACL
- NEA Solo Performance Fellowship
