= John Okada =

American novelist

John Kozo Okada
- Born: John Kozo Okada; September 23, 1923; Seattle, Washington, U.S.
- Died: February 20, 1971 (aged 47)
- Education: University of Washington (BA); Columbia University (MA)
- Writing career
- Notable work: No-No Boy

John Kozo Okada (Japanese: 岡田 幸三, romanized: Okada Kōzō, September 23, 1923 – February 20, 1971) was a Japanese American novelist known for his critically acclaimed novel No-No Boy.

== Biography ==
Born in Seattle, Okada was a student at the University of Washington during the attack on Pearl Harbor. Okada had to interrupt his studies, and he and his family were among thousands of American citizens interned at Minidoka War Relocation Center in 1942 as a result of Executive Order 9066.

Okada was taken out of the internment camp and recruited to the United States Army Air Forces after he completed a loyalty questionnaire which asked him to "forswear allegiance" to the Emperor of Japan. He served as a Japanese translator, overflying Japanese forces in the Pacific and translating intercepted Japanese communications.

After the war, Okada returned to his educational pursuits, earning a bachelor's degree in English and a second bachelor's degree in library science from the University of Washington, as well as a master's degree in English from Columbia University. In 1956, Okada completed the manuscript for his novel No-No Boy, which was published the following year.

Over the years, Okada worked several different jobs including as a librarian and technical writer. Okada died of a heart attack on February 20, 1971, at the age of 47. He was survived by his wife Dorothy, as well as a son and a daughter. He is interred at Evergreen Washelli Memorial Park in Seattle.

Okada's younger brother Frank Okada was a noted abstract expressionist painter.

== Literary works ==
Okada's only completed and published novel, No-No Boy (1957), deals with the aftermath of the Japanese American internment during World War II, Japanese-American identity, and how this event divided the Japanese American population after the war. He explored feelings among Japanese nationals, some of whom still held dreams of a return to Japan, and among their native-born American children, who felt conflicted about their identity but identified with the United States. Some of both generations were intensely bitter about their treatment in being interned during the war, in addition to the substantial economic and social losses they had suffered.

The protagonist is a native-born American of Japanese descent who answered "No" on two important questions posed by the government: would he vow loyalty and would he enlist in the Army? Those who answered "no" were sentenced to two years in prison. On returning to Seattle after prison, he has to confront veterans whom he knew from before the war, some of whom were wounded and all of whom look down on him. He also struggles with his parents, as his mother clings to the belief that Japan did not lose the war and eventually loses her sanity.

The novel did not get much notice, coming too soon after the war for people to want to explore the harshness of his portrayal and confrontation with hard questions. Okada's novel was rediscovered by a group of Asian American writers from Los Angeles, who tracked down Okada’s wife to see if she had any of his manuscripts. She had struggled after his death and, unable to find a publisher interested in his next manuscript and disappointed at the rejection of his papers by UCLA, she burned everything: novel, notes, letters, much to the dismay of the writers.

In his introduction to the new 1976 edition of the novel, Lawson Fusao Inada writes of meeting Okada's wife, Dorothy, in La Grande, Oregon 1976:

Dorothy is a truly wonderful person. It hurt to have her tell us that "John would have liked you." It hurt to have her tell us that "you two are the first ones who ever came to see him about his work." It hurt to have her tell us that she recently burned his "other novel about the Issei, which we both researched and which was almost finished." It hurt to have her tell us that "the people I tried to contact about it never answered so when I moved I burned it, because I have him in my heart." [...] You could say John was "ahead of his time," that he was born too early and died too young.

In 2018, Frank Abe, Greg Robinson, and Floyd Cheung published John Okada: The Life and Rediscovered Writings of the Author of No-No Boy. This volume, which received an American Book Award in 2019, includes a substantial biography authored by Abe and based on interviews with Okada's family members and friends. The rediscovered works include a poem that Okada wrote during the night of the attack on Pearl Harbor entitled "I Must Be Strong," a play about the US occupation of Japan which was produced at the Tryout Theater in 1946, five short stories which were published in the Northwest Times in 1947, and two satirical essays about the military-industrial complex written during his stint as a technical writer at Hughes Aircraft Company between 1958 and 1961.

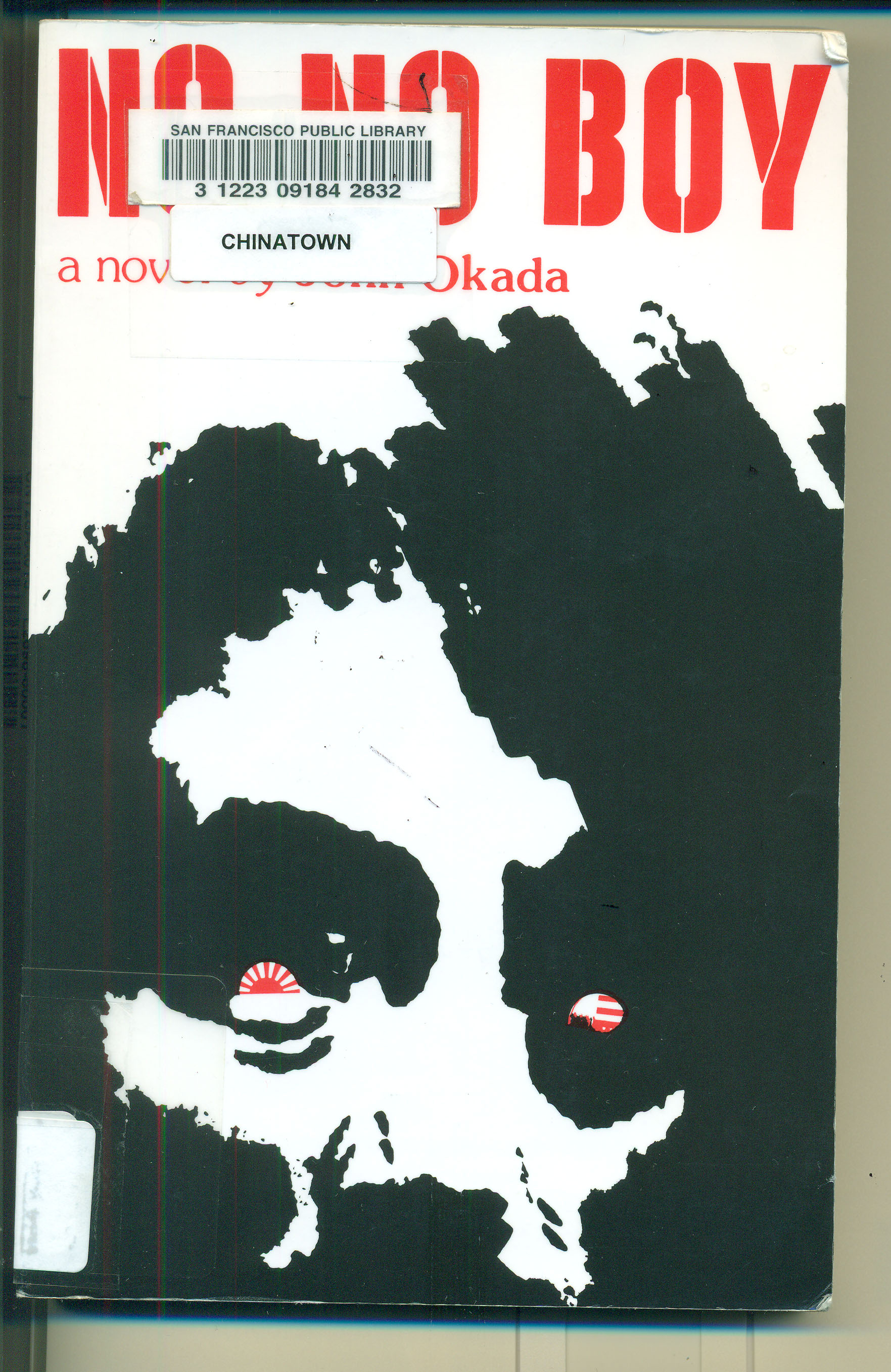
Front cover of the University of Washington Press 1976 edition of No-No Boy with Bob Onodera's design

== Legacy and honors ==
The Asian-American ethnic-theme dorm at Stanford University is named Okada in John Okada's honor.

== See also ==
- List of Asian American writers
- No-No Boy (play)

== Critical studies ==
(from the MLA database, March 2008)

1. A Lacanian Reading of No-No Boy and Obasan: Traumatic Thing and Transformation into Subjects of Jouissance By: Chen, Fu-Jen; Comparatist: Journal of the Southern Comparative Literature Association, 2007 May; 31: 105–29. (journal article)
2. "Psychology and Asian American Literature: Application of the Life-Story Model of Identity to No-No Boy" By: Cheung, Floyd; CR: The New Centennial Review, 2006 Fall; 6 (2): 191–214. (journal article)
3. "A Passion for the Impossible: Richard Rorty, John Okada, and James Baldwin" By: Bush, Harold K. Jr.. pp. 171–86 IN: Griesinger, Emily (ed. and introd.); Eaton, Mark (ed.); The Gift of Story: Narrating Hope in a Postmodern World. Waco, TX: Baylor UP; 2006. xii, 391 pp. (book article)
4. "Once More, with Feeling: Cold War Masculinity and the Sentiment of Patriotism in John Okada's No-No Boy" By: Kim, Daniel Y.; Criticism: A Quarterly for Literature and the Arts, 2005 Winter; 47 (1): 65–83. (journal article)
5. "John Okada" By: Pulliam, June. pp. 260–64 IN: Madsen, Deborah L. (ed. and introd.); Asian American Writers. Detroit, MI: Gale; 2005. xxiv, 460 pp. (book article)
6. Two Negations: Fear of Being Excluded and the Logic of Self-Esteem By: Sakai, Naoki; Novel: A Forum on Fiction, 2004 Summer; 37 (3): 229–57. (journal article)
7. "Two Negations: The Fear of Being Excluded and the Logic of Self-Esteem" By: Sakai, Naoki. pp. 159–92 IN: Calichman, Richard F. (ed. and introd.); Contemporary Japanese Thought. New York, NY: Columbia UP; 2005. viii, 309 pp. (book article)
8. "Wounded Bodies and the Cold War: Freedom, Materialism, and Revolution in Asian American Literature, 1946-1957" By: Nguyen, Viet Thanh. pp. 158–82 IN: Lawrence, Keith (ed.); Cheung, Floyd (ed.); Recovered Legacies: Authority and Identity in Early Asian American Literature. Philadelphia, PA: Temple UP; 2005. xii, 308 pp. (book article)
9. "Suffering Male Bodies: Representations of Dissent and Displacement in the Internment-Themed Narratives of John Okada and Toshio Mori" By: Arakawa, Suzanne. pp. 183–206 IN: Lawrence, Keith (ed.); Cheung, Floyd (ed.); Recovered Legacies: Authority and Identity in Early Asian American Literature. Philadelphia, PA: Temple UP; 2005. xii, 308 pp. (book article)
10. "'A Prisoner of Forever': Cognitive Distortions and Depressions in John Okada's No-No Boy" By: Storhoff, Gary; Interdisciplinary Literary Studies: A Journal of Criticism and Theory, 2004 Fall; 6 (1): 1-20. (journal article)
11. "English as a Postcolonial Tool" By: Eoyang, Eugene Chen; English Today: The International Review of the English Language, 2003 Oct; 19 (4 [76]): 23–29. (journal article)
12. "The Mother That Won't Reflect Back: Situating Psychoanalysis and the Japanese Mother in No-No Boy" By: Gribben, Bryn; MELUS: The Journal of the Society for the Study of the Multi-Ethnic Literature of the United States, 2003 Summer; 28 (2): 31–46. (journal article)
13. "Sticky Rice Balls or Lemon Pie: Enjoyment and Ethnic Identities in No-No Boy and Obasan" By: Xu, Wenying; Lit: Literature Interpretation Theory, 2002 Jan-Mar; 13 (1): 51–68. (journal article)
14. "Not Waving but Drowning: Creativity and Identity in Diaspora Writing" By: Lim, Shirley; Studies in the Linguistic Sciences, 2001 Spring; 31 (1): 31–47. (journal article)
15. "No-No Boy by John Okada" By: Ling, Jinqi. pp. 140–50 IN: Wong, Sau-ling Cynthia (ed. and introd.); Sumida, Stephen H. (ed. and introd.); A Resource Guide to Asian American Literature. New York, NY: Modern Language Association of America; 2001. vi, 345 pp. (book article)
16. "Resilient ImagiNations: No-No Boy, Obasan and the Limits of Minority Discourse" By: Amoko, Apollo O.; Mosaic: A Journal for the Interdisciplinary Study of Literature, 2000 Sept; 33 (3): 35–55. (journal article)
17. "John Okada (1923–1971)" By: Chen, Fu-jen. pp. 281–88 IN: Nelson, Emmanuel S. (ed. and preface); Asian American Novelists: A Bio-Bibliographical Critical Sourcebook. Westport, CT: Greenwood; 2000. xi, 422 pp. (book article)
18. "Shakespeare, Okada, Kingston: The First Generation" By: Kehler, Dorothea; Comparatist: Journal of the Southern Comparative Literature Association, 1998 May; 22: 110–22. (journal article)
19. "An Issei Woman's Suffering, Silence, and Suicide in John Okada's No-No Boy" By: Usui, Masami; Chu-Shikoku Studies in American Literature, 1997 June; 33: 43–61. (journal article)
20. "'Double Consciousness,' Sociological Imagination, and the Asian American Experience" By: Wang, Qun; Race, Gender & Class: Asian American Voices, 1997; 4 (3): 88–94. (journal article)
21. "'You Had to Be One or the Other': Oppositions and Reconciliation in John Okada's No-No Boy" By: Yogi, Stan; MELUS, 1996 Summer; 21 (2): 63–77. (journal article)
22. "Race, Power, and Cultural Politics in John Okada's No-No Boy" By: Ling, Jinqi; American Literature: A Journal of Literary History, Criticism, and Bibliography, 1995 June; 67 (2): 359–81. (journal article)
23. "To Belong or Not to Belong: The Liminality of John Okada's No-No Boy" By: Yeh, William; Amerasia Journal, 1993; 19 (1): 121–33. (journal article)
24. The Collapse of Difference: Dysfunctional and Inverted Celebrations in John Okada's No-No Boy By: Yogi, Stan; Revue Francaise d'Etudes Americaines, 1992 Aug; 53: 233–44. (journal article)
25. Momotaro's Exile: John Okada's No-No Boy By: Sato, Gayle K. Fujita. pp. 239–58 IN: Lim, Shirley Geok-lin (ed. & introd.); Ling, Amy (ed. & introd.); Kim, Elaine H. (fwd.); Reading the Literatures of Asian America. Philadelphia: Temple UP; 1992. xvii, 376 pp. (book article)
26. Discourse and Dislocation: Rhetorical Strategies of Asian-American Exclusion and Confinement By: Palumbo-Liu, David; Lit: Literature Interpretation Theory, 1990 July; 2 (1): 1–7. (journal article)
27. No-No Boy de John Okada (1957): Les Japonais Nisei après la deuxième guerre mondiale et les affres de l'américanisation By: Rigal-Cellard, Bernadette. pp. 89–104 IN: Séminaires 1985. Talence: Centre de Recherches sur l'Amér. Anglophone, Maison des Sciences de l'Homme d'Aquitaine; 1986. 153 pp. (book article)
28. Of Place and Displacement: The Range of Japanese-American Literature By: Inada, Lawson Fusao. pp. 254–265 IN: Baker, Houston A. Jr. (ed. & pref.); Ong, Walter J. (introd.); Three American Literatures: Essays in Chicano, Native American, and Asian-American Literature for Teachers of American Literature. New York: Modern Language Assn. of America; 1982. 265 pp. (book article)
29. After Imprisonment: Ichiro's Search for Redemption in No-No Boy By: McDonald, Dorothy Ritsuko; MELUS, 1979 Fall; 6 (3): 19–26. (journal article)
30. "The Vision of America in John Okada's No-No Boy" By: Inada, Lawson Fusao; Proceedings of the Comparative Literature Symposium, 1978; 9: 275–87. (journal article)
31. No-No Boy By: Inada, Lawson Fusao. Seattle: Combined Asian-Amer. Resources Project (U of Washington P); 1978. 276 pp. (book)
