= Heart Mountain =

Heart Mountain can refer to:

- Heart Mountain (Alberta), Canada
- Heart Mountain (Wyoming), United States

- Heart Mountain War Relocation Center, Wyoming, United States

Heart Mountain is also a common toponym for various peaks in North America.
