= Julena Steinheider Duncombe =

American mathematician (1911–2003)

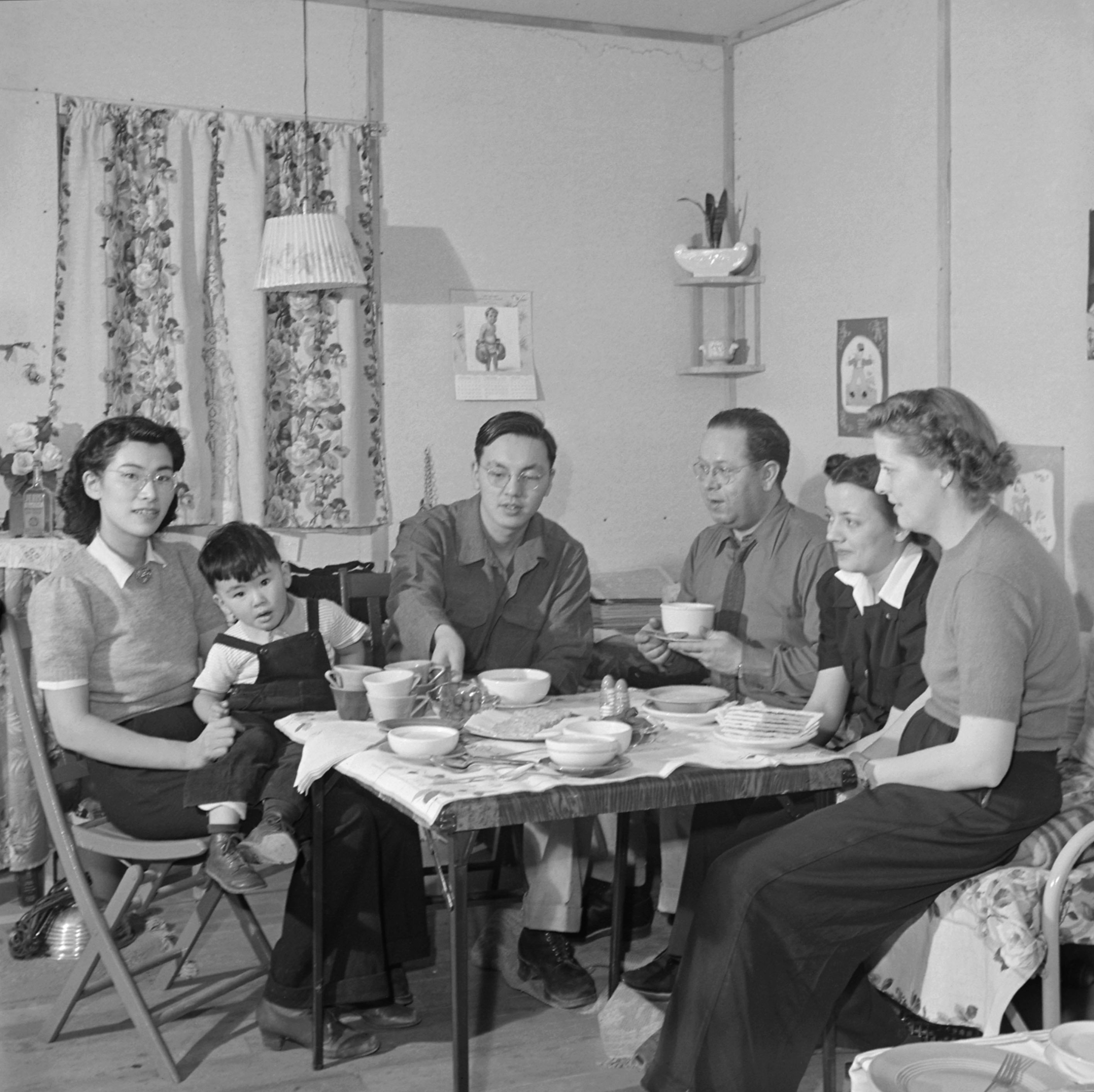
Julena Steinheider (far right) and two other staff members dining with interned newspaper editor Bill Hosokawa and his family at Heart Mountain

Julena Steinheider Duncombe (1911–2003) was an American mathematician and astronomer. She was known for her work as a teacher at the Heart Mountain Relocation Center and as an astronomer at the United States Naval Observatory, where she made pioneering observations with the 6-inch transit circle, introduced the use of punched cards in cataloging stars and constructing tables of positions of celestial bodies, and led the production of eclipse predictions for almanacs.

== Life ==
Julena Steinheider was born in Dorchester, Nebraska on September 21, 1911, the only daughter among five children of a farming family. She graduated in 1932 from Doane College with a degree in mathematics and a minor in astronomy. She became a teacher, first in a one-room schoolhouse and later as a geometry teacher at the Heart Mountain Relocation Center in Wyoming, one of the internment camps for Japanese-Americans during World War II.

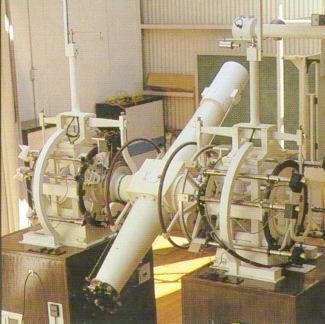
The 6-inch transit circle at the USNO. Although it had been built much earlier in 1898, Duncombe become the first woman to use it.

She began working for the United States Naval Observatory in Washington, DC in 1944, and met her husband, astronomer Raynor L. Duncombe, there. They married in 1948, and she took her husband's name. They moved to Yale University, but returned to the Naval Observatory in 1950.

Duncombe retired in 1973, and moved with her husband in 1975 to Austin, Texas, maintaining a second home in Highlands, North Carolina. In her retirement, she assisted her husband with the production of the journal Celestial Mechanics.

She died on September 13, 2003.

== Recognition ==
Duncombe was elected as a fellow of the American Association for the Advancement of Science.
