= Lincoln Kanai =

Japanese American social worker

- Born: December 5, 1908
- Died: February 1982
- Education: University of Hawaiʻi
- Occupation: Social worker

Lincoln Seiichi Kanai (December 5, 1908 – February 1982) was a social worker who was one of several Japanese Americans to bring a legal challenge against the exclusion of people of Japanese ancestry from the West Coast during World War II.

== Biography ==
Kanai was born December 5, 1908, in the small town of Koloa in what was then the Territory of Hawaii. He received his B.A. in English from the University of Hawaiʻi in 1930, and in 1935, after his return from an extended trip to Japan, he began working for the Lihue, Kauai YMCA. In 1937, Kanai moved to California to take a job at San Francisco's Buchanan Street YMCA, where he remained until the war.

After the attack on Pearl Harbor, Kanai testified before the Tolan Committee and corresponded with various political and military leaders, attempting to persuade them against the mass removal of Japanese Americans from California and quell the tide of anti-Japanese prejudice that had cost many Japanese Americans their jobs. His proposals to hold hearings to assess the loyalty of Japanese Americans instead of removing them en masse, and to allow students, the elderly and handicapped individuals to avoid incarceration went unheeded. When the Western Defense Command issued an order for the Japanese American residents of San Francisco to present themselves for "evacuation" on May 20, 1942, Kanai did not comply, instead remaining in the city and continuing his advocacy efforts. On June 1 he left the Bay Area to attend a series of conferences and meetings on the removal and confinement of West Coast Japanese, and on July 11 he was arrested by the FBI at a YMCA convention outside Milwaukee, for violating Public Law 503, which enforced the provisions of President Roosevelt's Executive Order 9066. Kanai's lawyers issued a writ of habeas corpus, arguing that the creation of the West Coast exclusion zone was unconstitutional, but the court denied the petition, citing the fact that Kanai had admitted to knowing he was violating the law when he left California. He was tried under Public Law 503 in San Francisco and, on August 27, sentenced to six months. He was "released" to the Heart Mountain concentration camp in Wyoming on February 6, 1943, two months early for good behavior.

In October 1943, Kanai was granted leave to move to Milwaukee, where he took a job working with under-resourced boys. He moved to Battle Creek, Michigan in 1950, and lived there until his death in February 1982.
