= Hikaru Iwasaki =

American photographer

- Born: October 18, 1923; San Jose, California, U.S.
- Died: September 15, 2016 (aged 92)
- Known for: Photography

Hikaru “Carl” Iwasaki (October 18, 1923 – September 15, 2016) was an American born photographer of Japanese heritage who was sent to the Heart Mountain US internment camp as a teen during World War II following the signing of Executive Order 9066.

Born in San Jose, California, he "was a photographer in U.S. relocation camps for Japanese citizens during World War II." He was a contributor to Time, Life and Sports Illustrated magazines and photographed politicians and sports celebrities. He also photographed ordinary Japanese-Americans in the aftermath of the World War II internment. He also documented events of the civil rights movement, including the reaction to the Brown vs. the Board of Education in Topeka, Kansas in the 1950s.

== Photographs ==
Photo Gallery

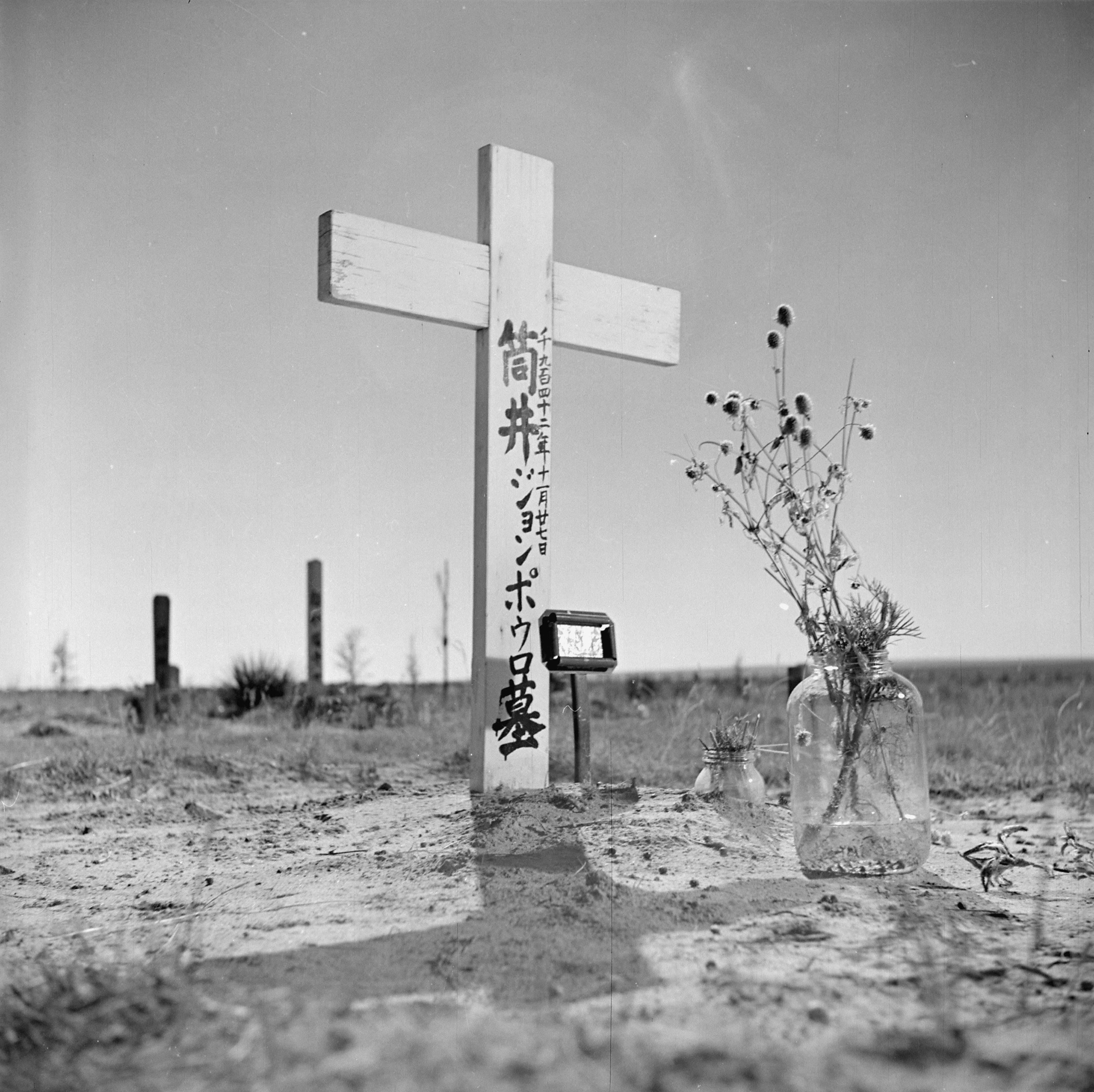
Grave Marker at the Granada Relocation Center

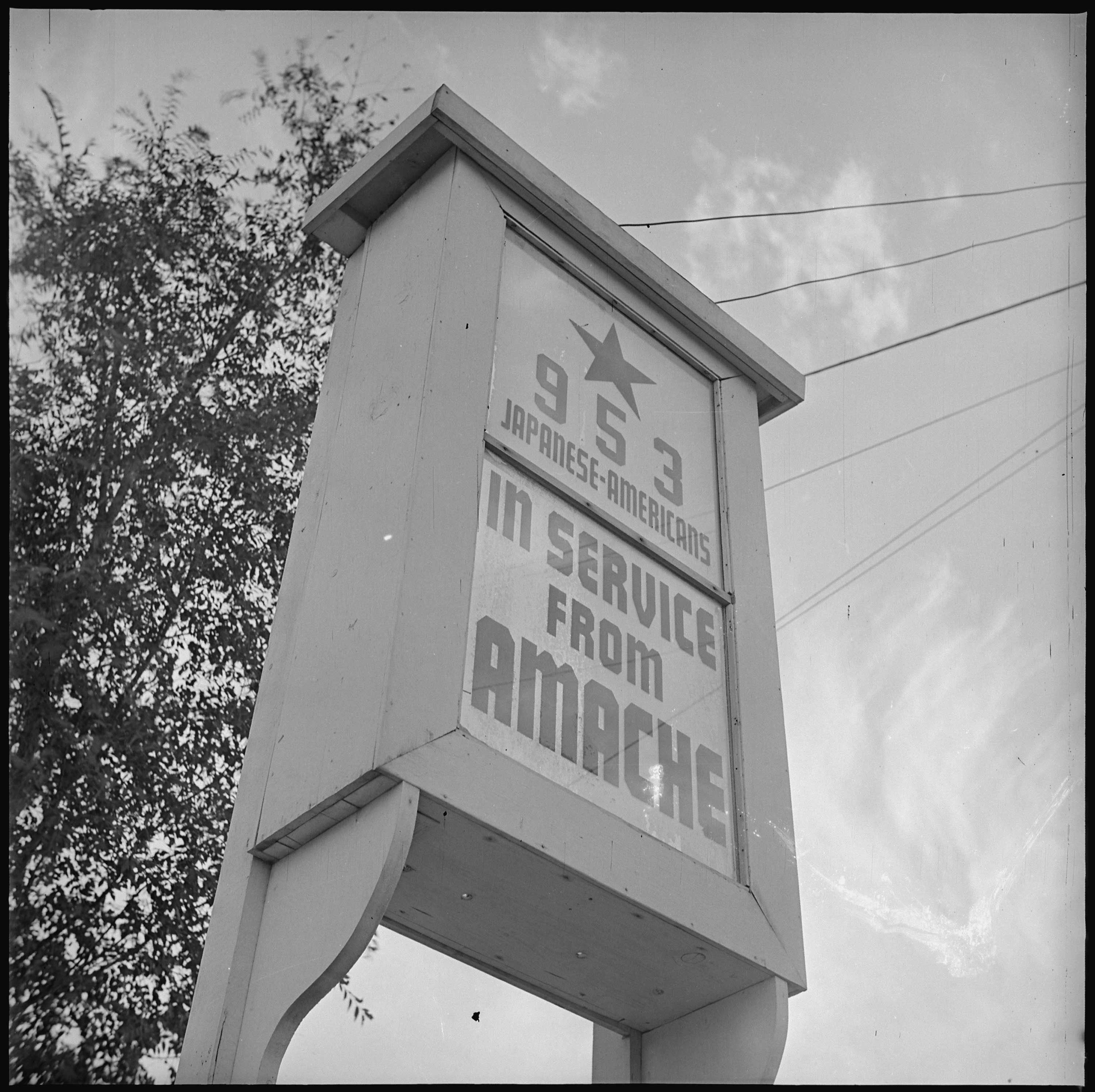
Military service sign from the Granada Relocation Center

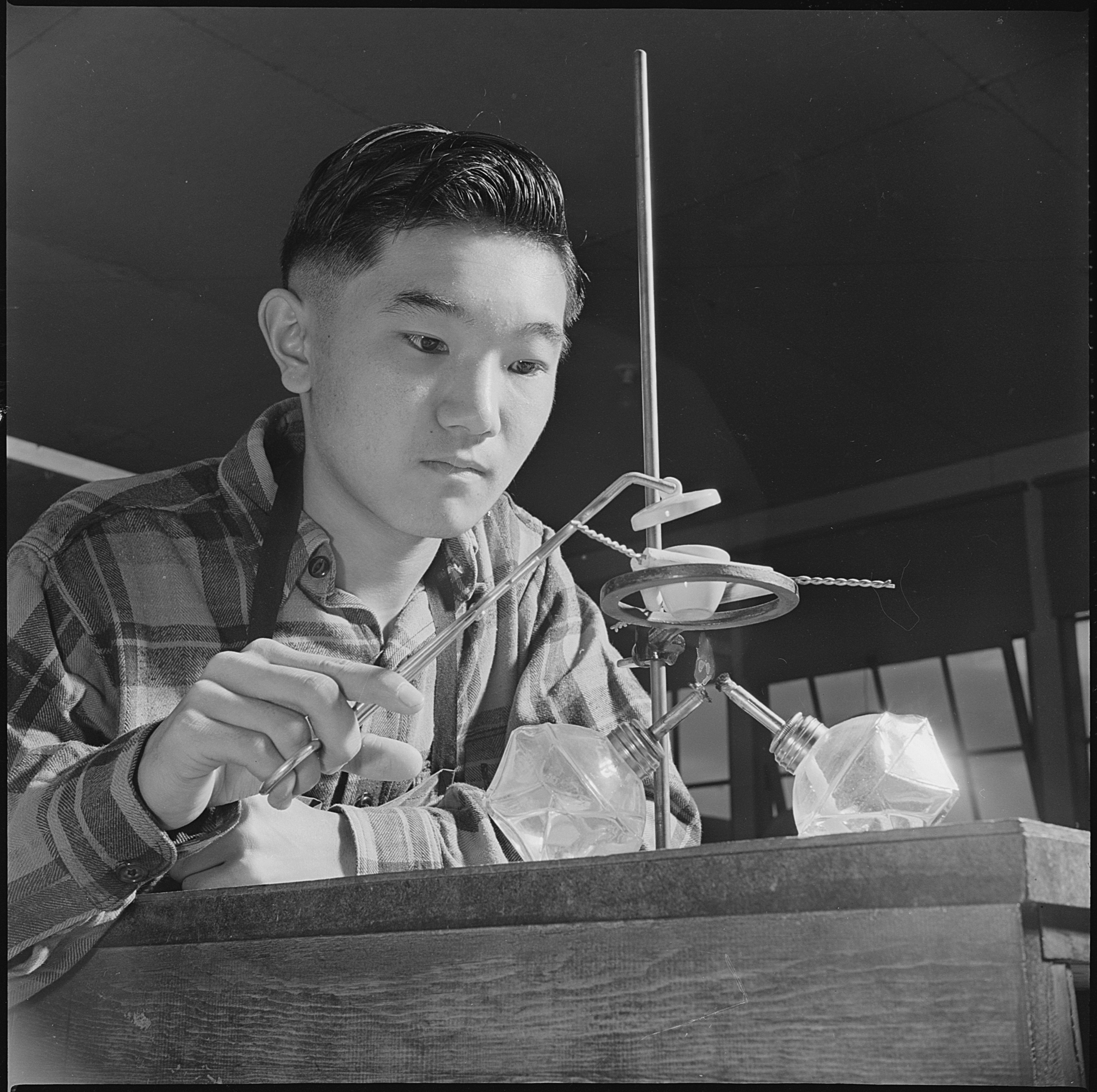
Harry Ishigaki conducts an experiment in Chemistry in the laboratory of the Heart Mountain High School.

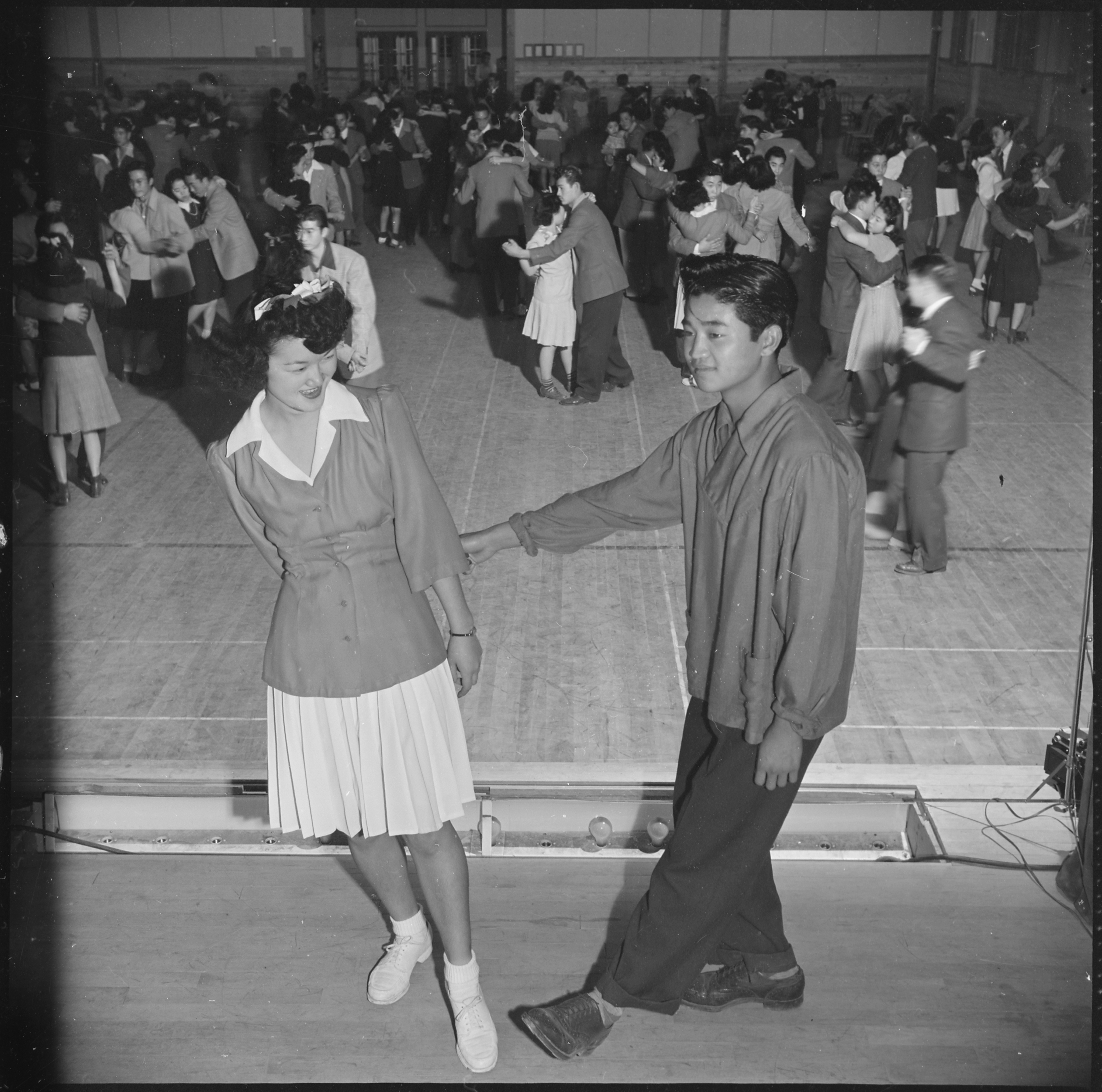
Heart Mountain Relocation Center, Heart Mountain, Wyoming. "Tubbie" Kunimatsu and Laverne Kurahara demonstrate some intricate jitterbug steps, during a school dance held in the high school gymnasium.

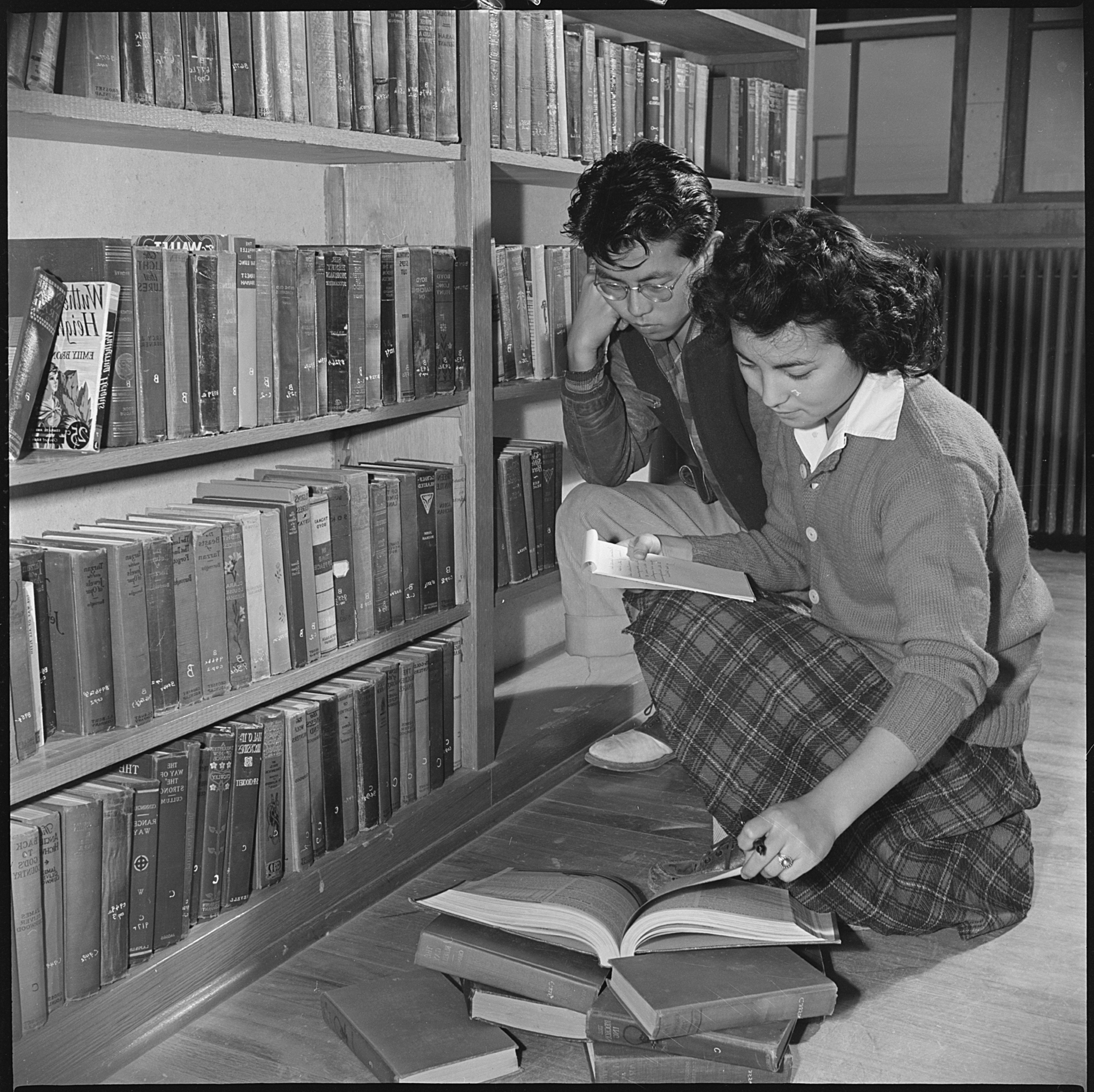
Heart Mountain Relocation Center, Heart Mountain, Wyoming. Scene in the Heart Mountain High School library

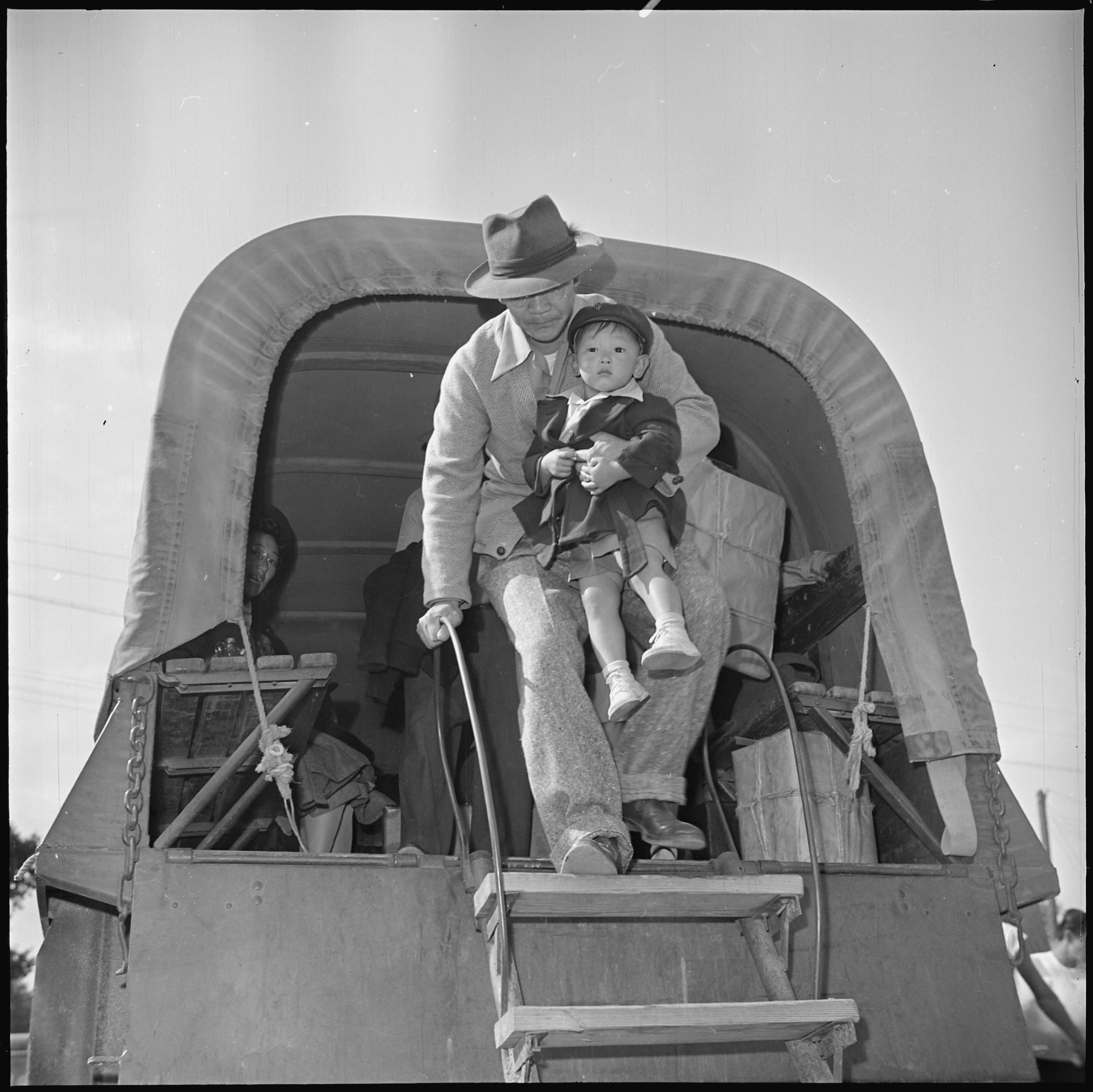
Granada Relocation Center internees arrive by truck to board trains taking them to California and elsewhere

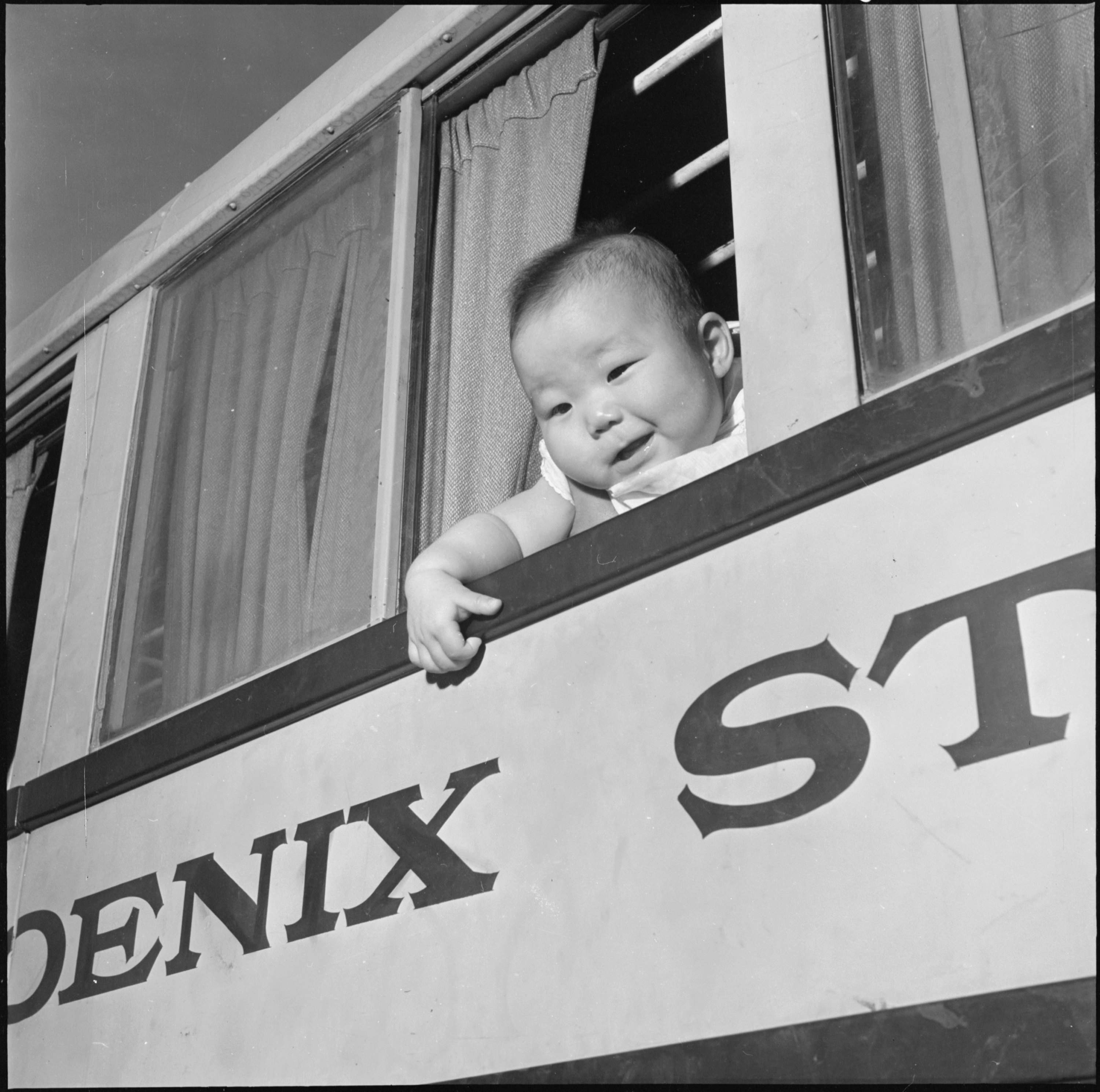
Internees of the Colorado River Relocation Center board trains

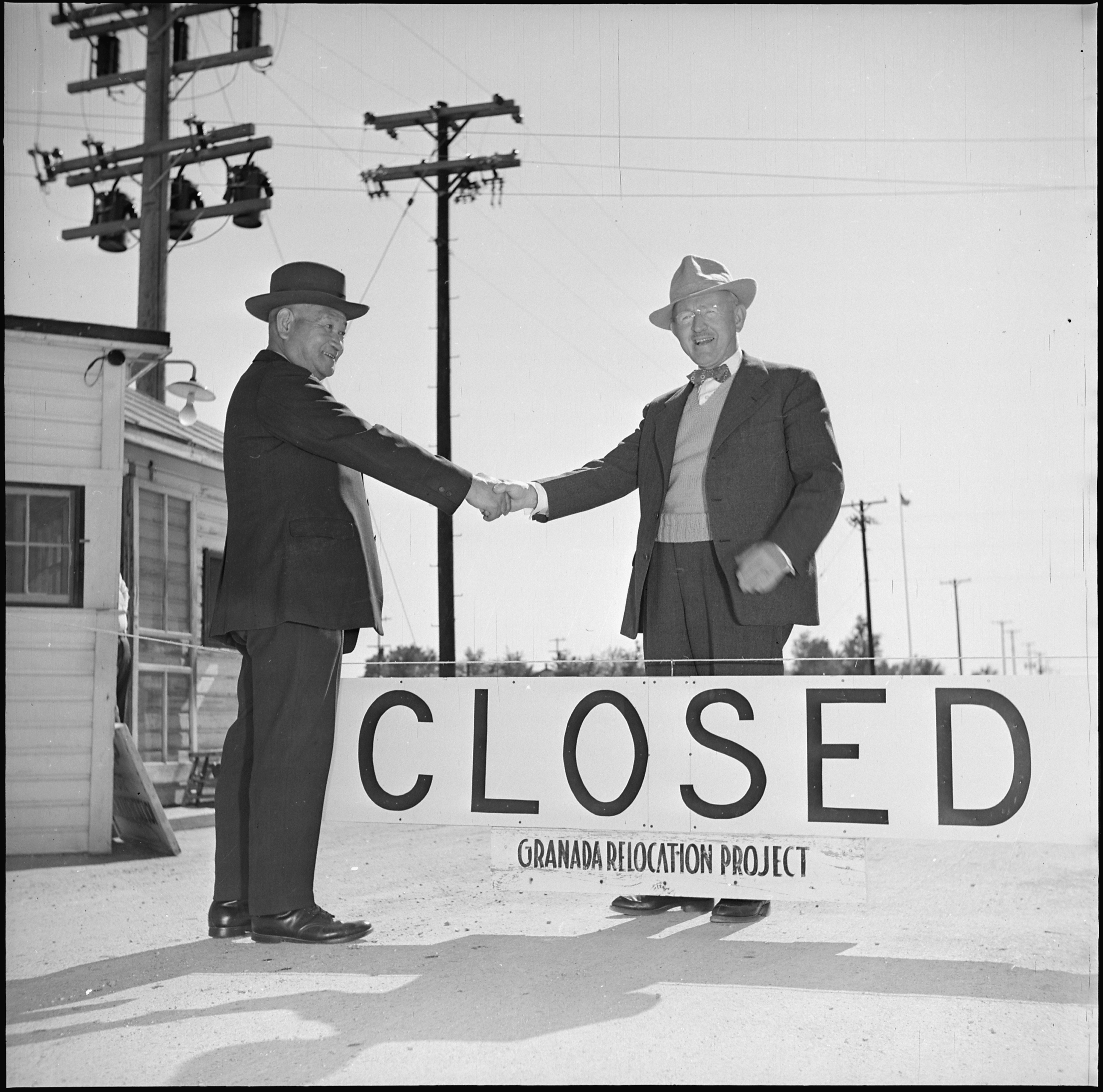
Shuichi Yamamoto, last Amache evacuee to leave the Granada Project Relocation Center

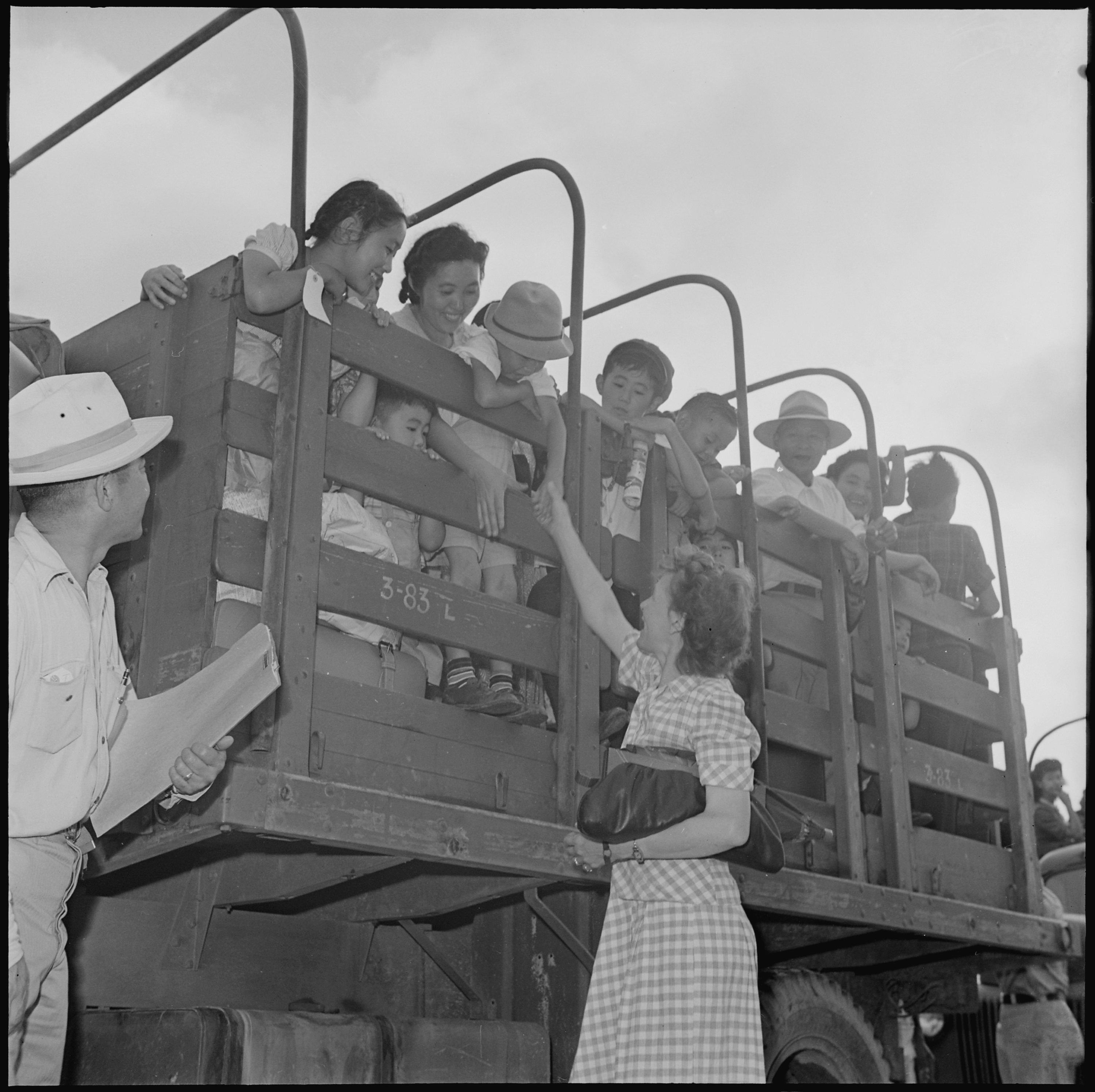
Closing of the Jerome Relocation Center, Denson, Arkansas. A teacher in the Jerome school bids goodye to some of her little pupils as they wait in the trucks to be put on the trains to other centers.

== See also ==
- Hikaru Iwasaki category on Wikimedia Commons
- Photos of Japanese-American Internment by Hikaru Iwasaki for the War Relocation Authority (WRA) in the National Archives Catalog.
- Hikaru Iwasaki entry on the Densho Encyclopedia
