= Mary Oyama Mittwer =

Japanese-American journalist (1907–1994)

- Born: June 19, 1907; Fairfield, California
- Died: January 12, 1994 (aged 86)
- Occupation: Journalist

Mary "Molly" Teiko Oyama Mittwer (1907–1994) was a Japanese American journalist and community organizer who is best known for covering controversial topics such as social reform, dating and marriage, racism and integration. Throughout the 1930s and 1940s, Oyama Mittwer wrote articles to help fellow Nisei Japanese Americans navigate the political and social complexities of the day and to promote multiracial and cross-cultural solidarity among activists of different racial and ethnic backgrounds. She wrote advice columns, articles, interviews, and poetry for major Japanese-American newspapers and journals, including but not limited Rafu Shimpo, Kashu Mainichi, Nichibei, Shin-Sekai, The New World Sun, Leaves, Gyo-Sho, Nisei magazine Current Life, and the Common Ground journal, which focused on giving minoritized racial groups a platform.

== Early life and education (1907–early 1930s) ==
Mary Teiko Oyama was born in Fairfield (or Petaluma), California, on June 19, 1907, and grew up in Sacramento. She was the eldest of six children of Katsuji Oyama, a calligrapher, and Miyo, an Issei woman who owned her own business.

Oyama attended Sacramento High School and later San Francisco National Training School, graduating in 1928. She briefly attended the University of Southern California in 1931.

== Career and family (1930s–1940s) ==
From 1935 to 1941, she wrote an etiquette and advice column, "I’m Telling You, Dierdre," for the San Francisco-based Japanese American newspaper The New World Sun, offering social guidelines to fellow Nisei. She also one of the founding members of the Nisei Writers Group, which was formed after a meeting on October 7, 1934 and became a catalyst in creating a distinctive Nisei literary voice. The Nisei Writers Group included other notable Japanese American writers such as Chiye Mori.

In 1937, Oyama married Fred Mittwer, who working with Japanese newspapers as a radio operator. They had two children and lived in Boyle Heights, Los Angeles. Their home became a community salon for political and literary discourse.

== Incarceration during World War II (1942–43) ==
In 1942 following Executive Order 9066, Mary Oyama Mittwer and Fred Mittwer were incarcerated in the Santa Anita Assembly Center and the Heart Mountain concentration camp and later in Denver in 1943. Fred Mittwer had previously lost his job after the attack of Pearl Harbor. A third child was born to the couple while in the camps. Oyama Mittwer's article, "My Only Crime is My Face", was published in the August 1943 issue of Liberty magazine. She is seen in a publication created by War Relocation Authority titled "New Neighbors Among Us."

== Post-war career (1943–1994) ==
In 1945, when the exclusion orders were lifted, the couple returned to their house in Los Angeles.

She gradually published less after the 1950s. In 1985, she participated in a Nisei writers’ conference at UCLA. She died on January 12, 1994.

== Relationships ==
Her brother-in-law was the Los Angeles-based furniture designer Henry Mittwer, who later became a Buddhist monk and disciple of Tenryuji Temple Kyoto, author of The Art of Chabana: Flowers for the Tea Ceremony. Her sister Lily married poet Yasuo Sasaki of Salt Lake City, Utah, editor of the Nisei literary publication Reimei.
