= Yosh Kuromiya =

American artist and architect (1923–2018)

Yosh Kuromiya (April, 1923 – July 24, 2018) was an American artist and landscape architect.

Kuromiya was born in Sierra Madre, California in 1923. He studied art at Pasadena Junior College prior to being sent to the Heart Mountain Relocation Center in 1942, following the signing of Executive Order 9066, as part of the World War II Internment of Japanese Americans. At the internment camp, he kept busy by drawing and working on other war time projects. Upset at not being treated as a full citizen of the United States, he resisted the draft inside camp in 1944 and was sent to prison. In 1947 Kuromiya, along with other Nisei draft resisters, were pardoned by President Harry Truman.

In 1957, Kuromiya went back to college and received his state license as a landscape architect from Polytechnic College and went on to have a career designing private gardens. In the 1960s, Kuromiya was involved in the civil rights movement. He also participated in the gay rights movement.
