= Heart Mountain Relocation Center =

Historic place in Wyoming, United States

- U.S. National Register of Historic Places
- U.S. National Historic Landmark
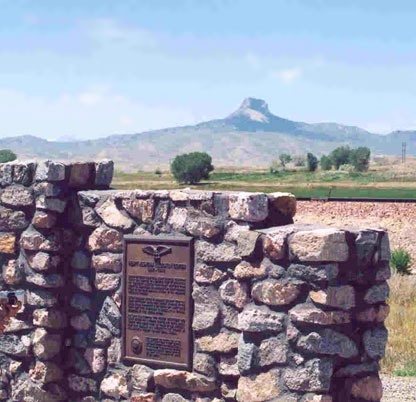
- Heart Mountain historical marker and mountain behind
- Location: Park County, Wyoming, U.S.
- Nearest city: Ralston, Wyoming
- Coordinates: 44°40′18″N 108°56′47″W
- Built: 1942
- Architects: US Army Corps of Engineers; Hazra Engineering; Hamilton Br. Co.
- NRHP reference No.: 85003167

Significant dates
- Added to NRHP: December 19, 1985
- Designated NHL: September 20, 2006

The Heart Mountain War Relocation Center, named after nearby Heart Mountain and located midway between the northwest Wyoming towns of Cody and Powell, was one of ten concentration camps used for the internment of Japanese Americans evicted during World War II from their local communities (including their homes, businesses, and college residencies) in the West Coast Exclusion Zone by the executive order of President Franklin Roosevelt (after the bombing of Pearl Harbor in December 1941, upon the recommendation of Lieutenant General John L. DeWitt).

This site was managed before the war by the federal Bureau of Reclamation as the would-be site of a major irrigation project. Construction of the camp's 650 military-style barracks and surrounding guard towers began in June 1942. The camp opened August 11, when the first Japanese Americans were shipped in by train from the internment program's "assembly centers" in Pomona, Santa Anita, and Portland. The camp would hold a total of 13,997 Japanese Americans over the next three years, with a peak population of 10,767, making it the third-largest "town" in Wyoming before its November 10, 1945, closure. Among the inmates, the notation "心嶺山 (Shinreizan)" was sometimes applied.

Heart Mountain is perhaps best known for many of its younger residents challenging the controversial draft of Nisei males from camp in order to highlight the loss of their rights through the incarceration. The Heart Mountain Fair Play Committee, led by Frank Emi and several others, was particularly active in this resistance, encouraging internees to refuse U.S. military induction until they and their families were released from camp and their civil rights were restored. Heart Mountain had the highest rate of draft resistance of all ten camps, with 85 young men and seven Fair Play Committee leaders ultimately sentenced and imprisoned for Selective Service Act violations. (At the same time, 649 Japanese American men—volunteers and draftees—joined the American military from Heart Mountain. In 1944, internees dedicated an Honor Roll listing the names of these soldiers, located near the camp's main gate.)

In 1988 and 1992 the U.S. government passed laws formally apologizing to Japanese Americans for the internment-era violations of their constitutional, state, and personal property rights; and establishing a temporary fund to pay limited reparations ($20,000) to still-living former internees (or their children) who applied and qualified for them. The street grid and numerous foundations are still visible. Four of the original barracks survive in place. A number of others sold and moved after the war have been identified in surrounding counties and may one day be returned to their original locations. In early 2007, 124 acres (50 ha) of the center were listed as a National Historic Landmark. The Bureau of Reclamation owns 74 acres (30 ha) within the landmark boundary and currently administers the site. The remaining 50 acres (20 ha) were purchased by the Heart Mountain Wyoming Foundation, a nonprofit organization established in 1996 to memorialize the center's internees and to interpret the site's historical significance.

The Foundation runs the Heart Mountain Interpretive Center, opened in 2011, located at 1539 Road 19, Powell. The museum includes photographs, artifacts, oral histories and interactive exhibits about the wartime relocation of Japanese Americans, anti-Asian prejudice in America and the factors leading to their enforced relocation and confinement.

== Establishing the camp ==
Plan of the Heart Mountain Relocation Center, 1945

=== Pre-war history ===
The land that would become the Heart Mountain War Relocation Center was originally part of the Shoshone Project, an irrigation project under the auspices of the Bureau of Reclamation. In 1897, 120,000 acres (49,000 ha) of land surrounding the Shoshone River in northwestern Wyoming was purchased by William "Buffalo Bill" Cody and Nate Salisbury, who in May 1899 acquired water rights to irrigate 60,000 acres (24,000 ha) surrounding Cody, Wyoming. After the project proved too costly for the original investors, the Wyoming State Board of Land Commissioners petitioned the federal government to take it over. The rights for the Cody-Salisbury tract were transferred to the Secretary of the Interior in 1904 and the Shoshone Project was approved later that year as one of the earliest Bureau of Reclamation (BOR) projects.

In 1937 during the Great Depression, the BOR used private contractors and Civilian Conservation Corps laborers to begin construction on the Shoshone Canyon Conduit and the Heart Mountain Canal, as one of a number of governmental infrastructure projects. The conduit, spanning 2.8 miles (4.5 km), was completed in September 1938. Construction on the unfinished canal stopped after the United States entered World War II.

=== Executive Order 9066 ===
Shortly after the Japanese attack on Pearl Harbor on December 7, 1941, President Franklin D. Roosevelt issued Executive Order 9066, which authorized military commanders to create zones from which "any or all persons may be excluded." The War Department had requested this and designated Western Washington and Oregon, southern Arizona, and all of California as Exclusion Zones on March 2, 1942. Four days later, the executive order informally extended to Alaska, covering the entire West Coast of the United States. It defined Japanese Americans, Italian Americans and German Americans as peoples to be excluded from these areas. Soon after the War Department initiated the removal of over 110,000 Japanese Americans from these areas, forcing them into temporary "assembly centers" run by the Wartime Civil Control Administration. Typically, these centers were hastily converted large public spaces, such as fairgrounds and horse racing tracks, while construction on Heart Mountain and the other more permanent "relocation centers" were completed.

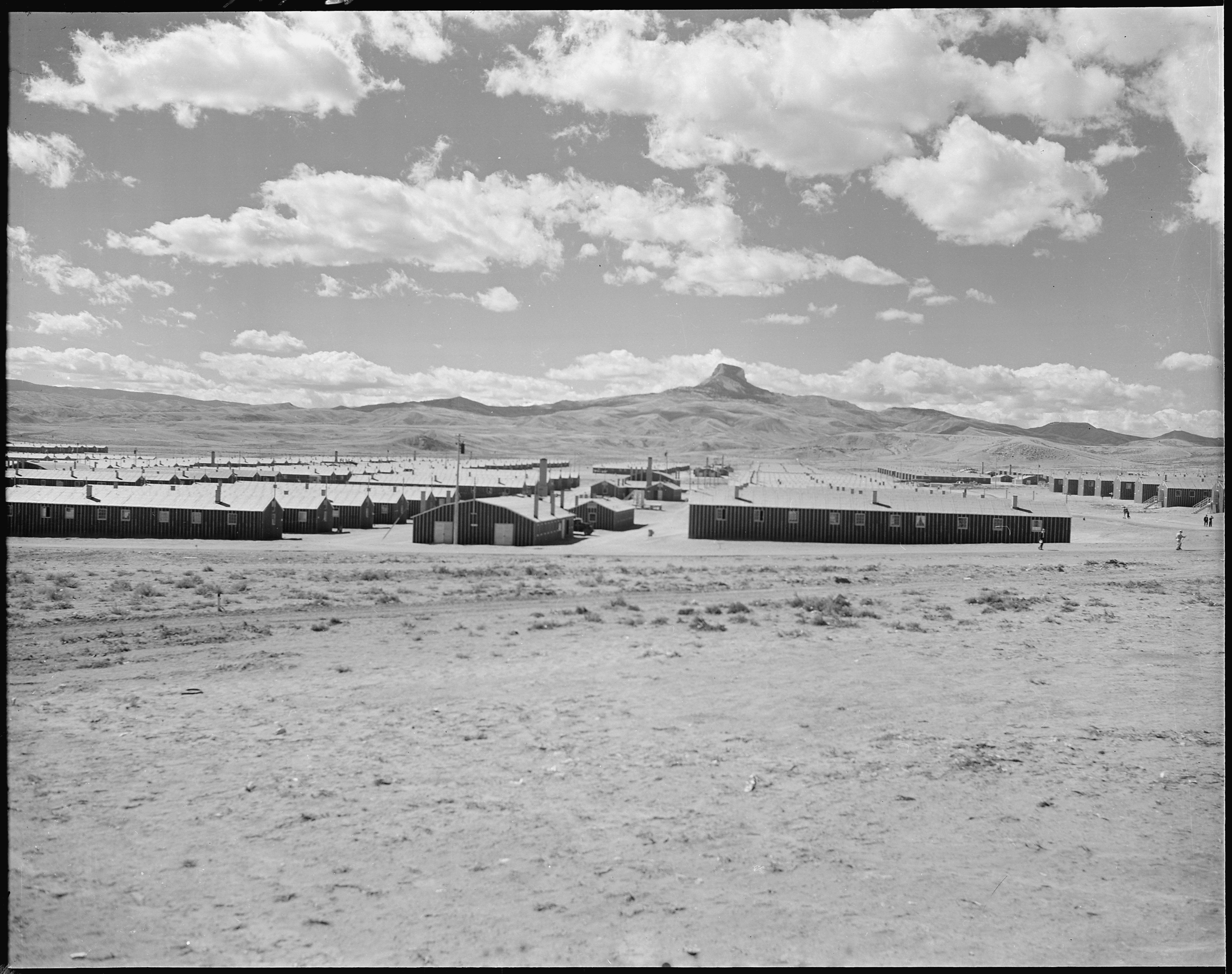
Heart Mountain, Wyoming. Looking west over the Heart Mountain Relocation Center with its sentry namesake, Heart Mountain, on the horizon. (NARA 538782)

=== Building Heart Mountain ===
On May 23, 1942, the War Department announced that one of the camps for displaced Japanese Americans would be located in Wyoming, and several communities, hoping to capitalize on internee labor for irrigation and land development projects, vied for the site. Heart Mountain was chosen because it was remote yet convenient, isolated from the nearest towns but close to fresh water and adjacent to a railroad spur and depot where Japanese Americans, as well as food and supplies, could be off-loaded.

On June 1, 1942, the Bureau of Reclamation transferred 46,000 acres (19,000 ha) of the Heart Mountain Irrigation Project and several CCC buildings to the War Relocation Authority, the branch of the Western Defense Command responsible for administration of the incarceration program. More than 2,000 laborers, including men employed by the Harza Engineering Company of Chicago and the Hamilton Bridge Company of Kansas City, began work on June 8, under the direction of the Army Corps of Engineers. The workers enclosed 740 acres (300 ha) of arid buffalo grass and sagebrush with a high barbed wire fence and nine guard towers. Within this perimeter, 650 military-style barracks were laid out in a street grid, with administrative, hospital, educational, and utility facilities, and 468 residential dormitories to house the internees.

All of the buildings were electrified, which was at the time a rarity in Wyoming, but due to time constraints and a largely unskilled workforce, the majority of these "buildings" were poorly constructed. Army higher-ups gave the site's chief engineer only sixty days to complete the project, and newspaper ads recruiting laborers promised jobs "if you can drive a nail" while workers boasted that it took them only 58 minutes to build an apartment barracks. Thousands of acres of surrounding land were designated for agricultural purposes, as the center was expected for the most part to be self-sufficient.

== World War II ==
=== Life in camp ===
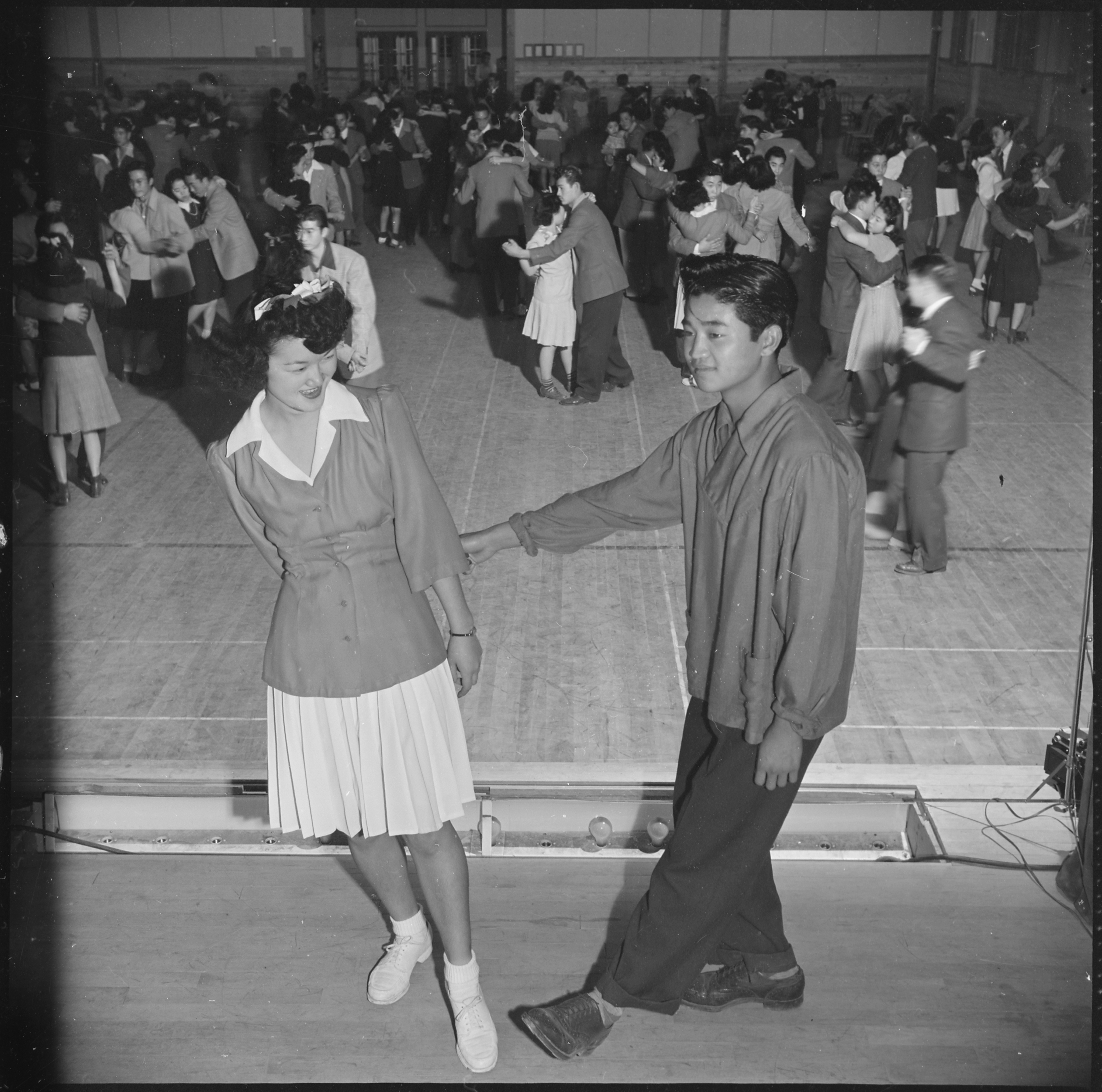
"Tubbie" Kunimatsu and Laverne Kurahara demonstrate some intricate jitterbug steps, during a school dance held in the high school gymnasium, November 1943.

The first inmates arrived in Heart Mountain on August 12, 1942: 6,448 from Los Angeles County; 2,572 from Santa Clara County; 678 from San Francisco; and 843 from Yakima County in Washington. After being assigned a barracks based on the size of their families, they began making small improvements on their new "apartments," hanging bed sheets to create extra "rooms," and stuffing newspaper and rags into cracks in the shoddily constructed walls and floors to keep out dust and cold. Some inmates went so far as to order tools from Sears & Roebuck catalogs in order to make repairs. Each barracks unit contained one light, a wood-burning stove, and an army cot and two blankets for each member of the family. Bathrooms and laundry facilities were located in shared utility halls, and meals were served in communal mess halls, both assigned by block. Armed military police manned the nine guard towers surrounding the camp.

Leadership positions in Heart Mountain were occupied by European-American administrators, although Nisei block managers and Issei councilmen were elected by the inmate population and participated, in a limited capacity, in administration of the camp. Employment opportunities were available in the hospital, camp schools and mess halls, as well as the garment factory, cabinet shop, sawmill and silk screen shop run by camp officials, although most inmates received a rather paltry salary of $12–$19 a month, due to the WRA's decision that the Japanese could not earn more than an army private regardless of job. (Caucasian nurses in the Heart Mountain hospital, for example, were paid $150/month compared to the $19/month given Japanese-American doctors) Additionally, some inmates worked on the unfinished Heart Mountain Canal for the Bureau of Reclamation, or did agricultural work outside the camp.

Children of inmates began school in barrack classrooms in October 1942. Books, school supplies, and furniture were limited. Despite the poor condition of the facilities, attending school offered a sense of normalcy to camp children. In May 1943, the camp high school had been constructed, and the elementary school restructured. The high school, which educated 1,500 students in its first year, featured regular classrooms, a gymnasium and library. Its sports team, including its football team, The Heart Mountain Eagles, eventually competed against other local high school teams.

Other sporting events, movie theaters, religious services, crafting groups, and social clubs kept inmates entertained and provided a distraction from the dullness of camp life. Knitting, sewing, and woodcarving were popular not only for entertainment, but because they allowed inmates to improve their dilapidated living conditions. Among children, Girl and Boy Scout programs flourished, as many Nisei had been members before internment. Heart Mountain's thirteen scout troops and two Cub Scout packs were the most of any of the ten camps. Scouts participated in normal scouting activities such as hiking, craft making, and swimming.

=== Draft resistance ===
In early 1943, camp officials began to administer a "Leave Clearance Form," better known as the loyalty questionnaire because of two controversial questions that tried to distinguish loyal and disloyal Japanese Americans. Question 27 asked whether men would be willing to serve in the armed forces, while Question 28 asked inmates to forswear all allegiance to the Emperor of Japan. Many, fearing it was a trick and any answer would be misconstrued, or, offended by the questions' implications, answered "no" to one or both questions, or gave a qualified response like, "I will serve when I am free." Soon after, Kiyoshi Okamoto organized the Heart Mountain Fair Play Committee to protest the infringement of Nisei citizen rights, and Frank Emi, Paul Nakadate and others began posting fliers around camp encouraging others not to respond to the questions.

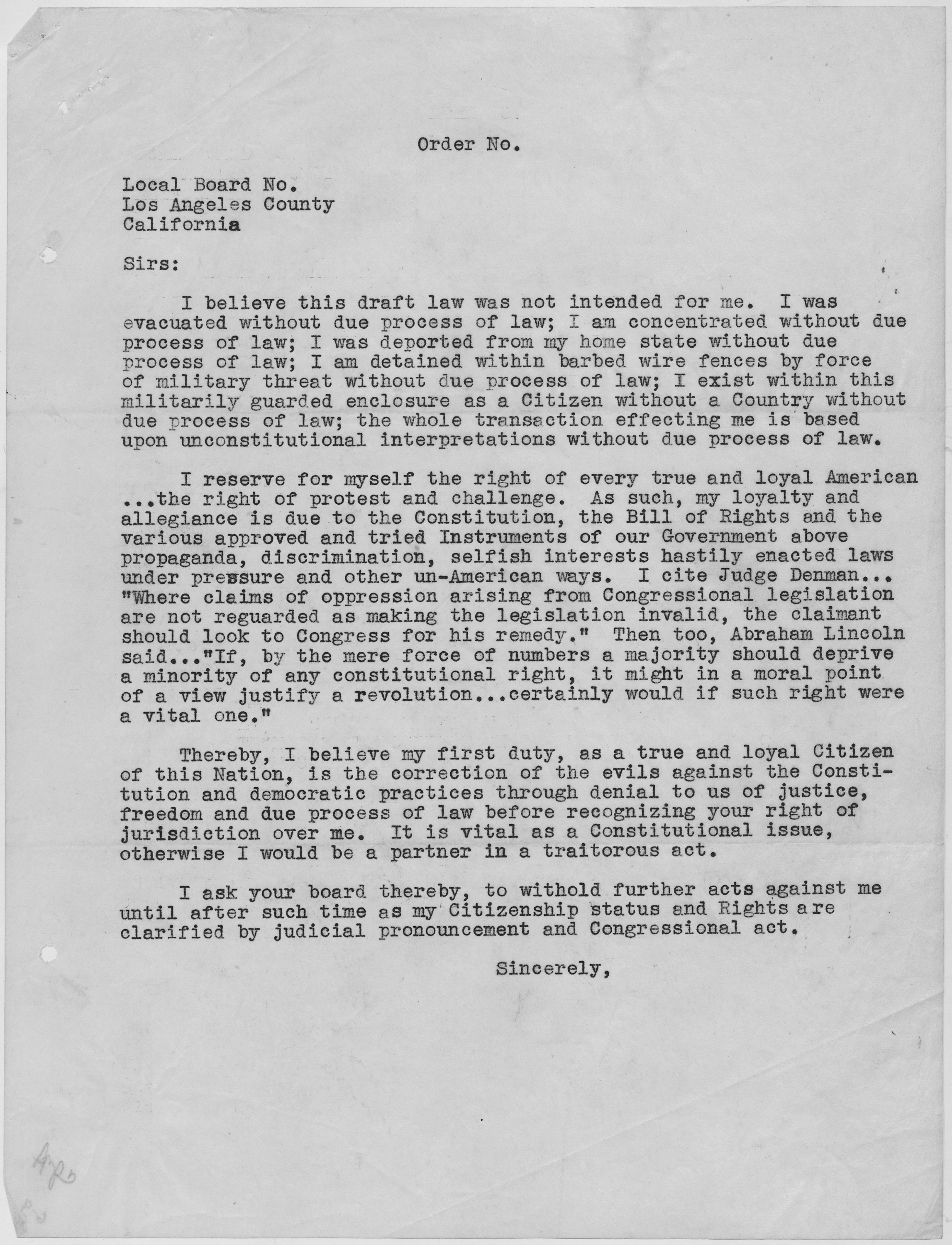
This document was included in the case of the U.S. vs. Kiyoshi Okamoto, et al. Okamoto and his co-defendants, members of the Heart Mountain Fair Play Committee, were indicted for conspiring to assist other Heart Mountain residents in their challenge to War Relocation Authority policies and the Selective Service Act as it applied to camp inmates. This letter to local Selective Service boards in California was apparently prepared as a model for internees to use to protest their eligibility for the draft. (NARA 292806)

When draft orders began arriving in Heart Mountain, Emi, Okamoto and the other leaders of the Fair Play Committee held public meetings to discuss the unconstitutionality of the incarceration and encourage other inmates to refuse military service until their freedom was restored. On March 25, 1944, twelve Heart Mountain resisters who had not reported for their draft physicals were arrested by U.S. Marshals. Emi and two other Committee members who had not received draft notices (due to their age or domestic status) tried to walk out of camp to highlight their status as prisoners of the government.

In July 1944, in the largest mass trial in Wyoming history, sixty-three Heart Mountain inmates were prosecuted after refusing to show up for their induction and convicted of felony draft evasion. A total of 300 draft resisters from eight WRA camps, including an additional 22 from Heart Mountain sentenced in a subsequent trial, were arrested for this charge, and most served time in federal prison. The seven older leaders of the Fair Play Committee were convicted of conspiracy to violate the Selective Service Act and sentenced to four years in federal prison. While the Poston concentration camp in Arizona had the highest number of resisters of any camp, at 106, Heart Mountain's 85 resisters from a much smaller population gave it the highest overall rate of draft resistance.

Although Heart Mountain is remembered primarily for its organized resistance to the draft, approximately 650 Nisei joined the U.S. Army from this camp, either volunteering or accepting their conscription into the legendary 100th Infantry Battalion, the famed 442nd RCT and MIS. Fifteen of these young men were killed in action and fifty-two wounded. Joe Hayashi and James K. Okubo posthumously received the Medal of Honor for valor in battle, making Heart Mountain the only one of the ten WRA camps to have more than one Medal of Honor recipient. In late 1944, camp inmates erected an Honor Roll in front of the administration building listing the names of these soldiers. This wooden tribute stood for five decades, until the Heart Mountain Wyoming Foundation removed the deteriorating display for preservation. An accurate reproduction, completed in 2003, now stands in place of the original. The original Honor Roll is being conserved and restored.

=== The end of the war ===
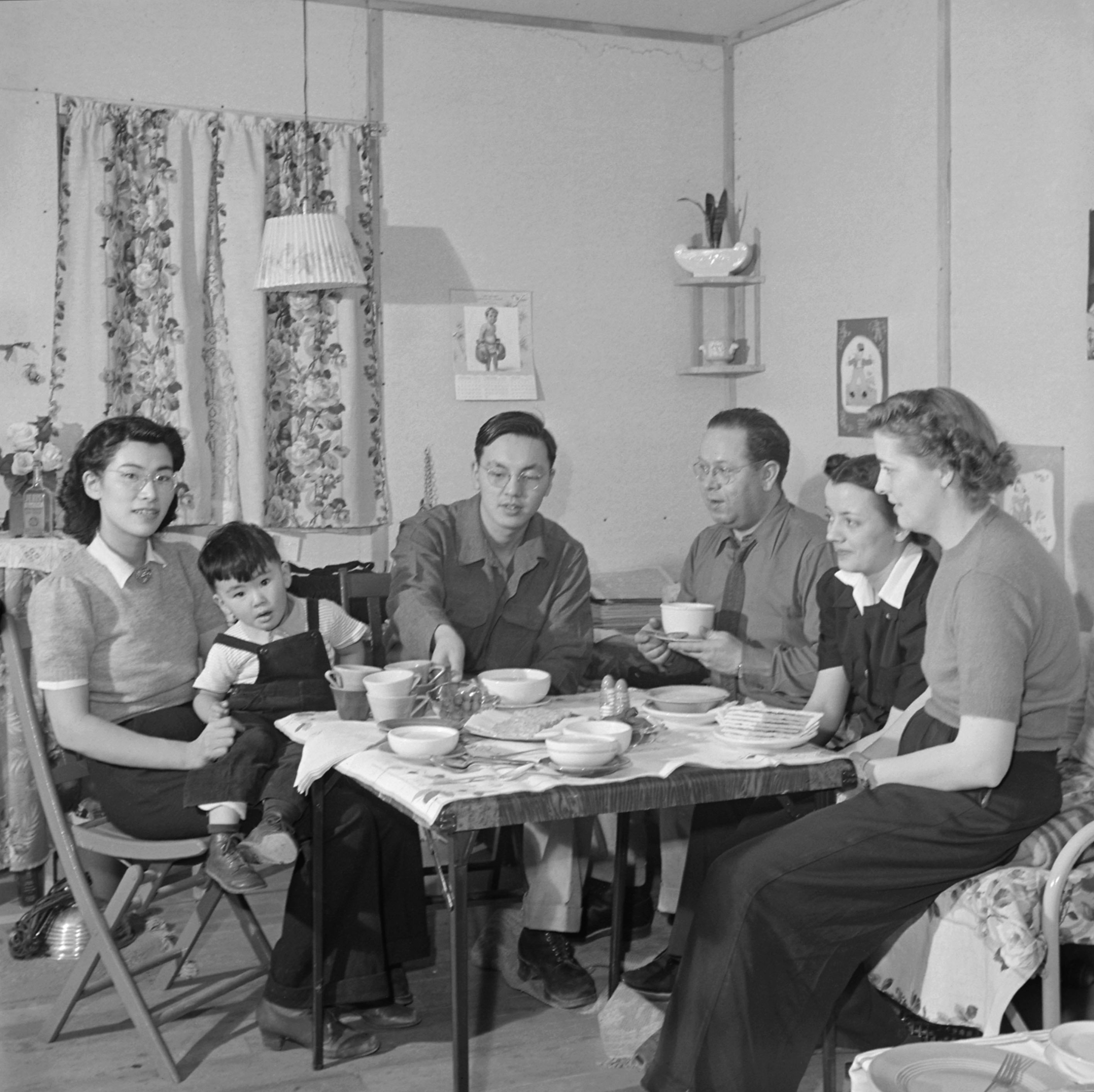
The home of the Hosokawas, with (left to right) Alice and Bill Hosokawa with their son Mike alongside Vaughn Mechau, Margaret Jensen, and Julena Steinheider

By the time Roosevelt rescinded Executive Order 9066 in December 1944 and announced that Japanese Americans could begin returning to the West Coast the following month, many had already left camp, most for outside work or to attend college in the Midwest or East Coast. Beginning in January 1945, internees began to leave Heart Mountain for the West Coast, provided by administrators with $25 and a one-way train ticket to the location they had been picked up from three years earlier. However, even with the earlier group of resettlers, only 2,000 had left by June 1945, and the 7,000 still remaining within Heart Mountain for the most part represented those who were too young or too old to easily relocate. Many Japanese Americans, barred from owning their pre-war homes and farms by discriminatory legislation, had nothing to return to on the West Coast, but they were prohibited from homesteading in Wyoming by an alien land law passed by the state legislature in 1943 (a law that remained in place until 2001). Another Wyoming law excluding them from voting further discouraged Japanese Americans from staying in Wyoming. The last trainload of former inmates left Heart Mountain on November 10, 1945.

== Preservation and remembrance ==
After Heart Mountain closed, most of the land, barracks and agricultural equipment were sold to farmers and former servicemen, who established homesteads on and around the camp site. The Heart Mountain Irrigation Project continued after the war, and much of the camp's surrounding acreage was tilled for irrigation agriculture. Remnants of the hospital complex (including foundations and 3 buildings), a Heart Mountain High School storage shed, a root cellar, the Honor Roll World War II Memorial and a portion of a remodeled barrack are the only buildings still standing today.

The Heart Mountain Wyoming Foundation, established in 1996, has worked to preserve and memorialize the site and events, educate the general public about the Japanese American incarceration, and support research about the incarceration so that future generations can understand the lessons of the Japanese American incarceration experience. The Heart Mountain Wyoming Foundation is overseen by a 16-member Board of Directors and is led by the Chair, Shirley Ann Higuchi, a descendant of former internees. The board also includes former internees, scholars, and other professionals working on the local and national level. The Heart Mountain Wyoming Foundation gained National Historic Landmark status for the site in 2007 and on August 20, 2011, opened the Heart Mountain Interpretive Center. The Center features a permanent exhibit that provides an overview of the history of the wartime incarceration of Japanese Americans and the background of anti-Asian prejudice in America that led to it. Along with additional rotating exhibits, these photographs, artifacts and oral histories explore the incarceration experience, constitutional and civil rights issues, and the broader issues of race and social justice in America. Visitors can also participate in a walking tour of the site and its remaining structures. Former U.S. Secretary of Transportation Norman Y. Mineta and retired U.S. Senator Alan K. Simpson, who met as Boy Scouts on opposite sides of the barbed wire fence surrounding the Heart Mountain compound, were Honorary Advisors to the Foundation.

The Foundation hosts an annual pilgrimage at Heart Mountain, the first of which coincided with the Interpretive Center's 2011 opening.

== Terminology ==
Since the end of World War II, there has been debate over the terminology used to refer to Heart Mountain and the other camps in which Japanese Americans were incarcerated by the United States Government during the war. Heart Mountain has been referred to as a "War Relocation Center," "relocation camp," "relocation center," "internment camp," "incarceration camp," and "concentration camp," and the controversy over which term is the most accurate and appropriate continues to the present day. Scholars and activists have criticized "internment camp" for being a minimizing, misleading euphemism, as Japanese Americans were not there for protection, performed forced labor, and could not leave.

== Notable internees ==
- Hideo Date (1907–2005), a painter.
- Kathryn Doi (born 1942), Associate Justice of the California Second District Court of Appeals.
- Frank S. Emi (1916–2010), Heart Mountain Fair Play Committee leader and civil rights activist.
- Sadamitsu "S. Neil" Fujita (1921–2010), graphic designer who served in the 442nd Regimental Combat Team.
- Evelyn Nakano Glenn (born 1940), a professor of Gender & Women Studies and of Ethnic Studies at the University of California, Berkeley and founding director of the Center for Race and Gender (CRG). Also interned at Gila River.
- Mary Matsuda Gruenewald (1925–2021), memoirist. Also interned at Tule Lake.
- Joe Hayashi (1920–1945), 442nd RCT volunteer posthumously awarded Medal of Honor.
- Takashi Hoshizaki (born 1925), botanist, space biology researcher, and Japanese American civil rights advocate.
- Bill Hosokawa (1915–2007), author and journalist, editor of the camp newspaper "Heart Mountain Sentinel."
- Momoko Iko (1940–2020), an American playwright.
- Estelle Ishigo (née Peck) (1899–1990), an American artist married to a Nisei.
- George Igawa, leader of the George Igawa Orchestra, a jazz big band formed by musicians interned within the camp, which played for dances around the region.
- George Ishiyama (1914–2003), businessman and former president of Alaska Pulp Corporation. Also interned at Topaz.
- Hikaru Iwasaki (1923–2016), an American photographer.
- Lincoln Kanai (1908—1982), social worker and civil rights activist who brought a legal challenge to the eviction of Japanese Americans from the West Coast.
- Gyomay Kubose (1905–2000), a Buddhist teacher.
- Kiyoshi Kuromiya (1943–2000), an author and civil and social justice advocate.
- Yosh Kuromiya (1923–2018), Heart Mountain Fair Play Committee member who resisted the draft on constitutional grounds and promoted understanding of the Nisei draft resisters in film and public forums.
- Robert Kuwahara (1901–1964), animator.
- Bill Manbo (1908–1992), an amateur photographer.
- Sam Mihara (born 1933), an American author and history educator.
- Norman Mineta (1931–2022), United States Secretary of Transportation under George W. Bush and United States Secretary of Commerce under Bill Clinton.
- Lane Nakano (1925–2005), American soldier turned actor.
- Fusataro Nakaya (1886–1952), medical doctor (1916 graduate of University of Illinois Medical College), member of California Medical Association, Vice President of Los Angeles Japanese Association.
- Shigeki Oka (1878–1959), Issei newspaper publisher who was recruited by the British Armed Forces in World War II.
- Benji Okubo (1904–1975), an American painter, teacher, and landscape designer.
- James K. Okubo (1920–1967), 442nd RCT veteran posthumously awarded the Medal of Honor. Also interned at Tule Lake.
- Mary Oyama (1907–1994), a journalist and community organizer.
- Albert Saijo (1926–2011), poet.
- Doris Ota Saito (born 1933), illustrator.
- Nyogen Senzaki (1876–1958), Rinzai Zen monk who was one of the 20th century's leading proponents of Zen Buddhism in the United States.
- Louise Suski (1905–2003), first woman editor-in-chief and English-section editor-in-chief at Rafu Shimpo.
- Teiko Tomita (1896–1990), a tanka poet. Also interned at Tule Lake.
- Otto Yamaoka (1904–1967), an American actor and businessman who worked in Hollywood during the 1930s.

== See also ==
- Bibliography of the Japanese American Internment during World War II
- Outline of Japanese American Internment during World War II
- Densho: The Japanese American Legacy Project
- Japanese American internment
- Other camps:

- Gila River
- Granada (Amache)
- Jerome
- Manzanar
- Minidoka
- Poston
- Topaz
- Tule Lake
- Rohwer
