= Takashi Hoshizaki =

Japanese-American botanist

Takashi "Tak" Hoshizaki (born October 3, 1925) is a Japanese-American botanist, space biology researcher, and Japanese American civil rights advocate. During World War II, he was among 63 Japanese-American men prosecuted for resisting military conscription while incarcerated at the Heart Mountain War Relocation Center, one of the 10 concentration camps in the United States set up by Franklin D. Roosevelt.

After his release from federal prison and a presidential pardon, Hoshizaki served in the United States Army, earned a doctorate in botanical science, and pursued a research career that included work at NASA's Jet Propulsion Laboratory.

He received Japan's Foreign Minister's Commendation in 2024 and was named a recipient of the Order of the Rising Sun, Silver Rays, in 2025. He is a centenarian.

== Early life and concentration camp ==
Hoshizaki was born in Los Angeles, California, on October 3, 1925, the eldest of six children of Japanese immigrant parents. His father operated a grocery store in East Hollywood, in the area then known as J-Flats. Hoshizaki attended Belmont High School before his education was interrupted when President Franklin D. Roosevelt signed Executive Order 9066 to incarcerate Japanese Americans in concentration camps. The family was initially incarcerated at the Pomona Assembly Center in California and subsequently transferred to the Heart Mountain War Relocation Center near Cody, Wyoming. While incarcerated, Hoshizaki worked in the camp's mess hall and engineering department. He graduated from Heart Mountain High School in 1943.

== Draft resistance and imprisonment ==
In 1944, reinstated military conscription for Japanese American men, including those held in incarceration camps. Hoshizaki became associated with the Heart Mountain Fair Play Committee, whose members opposed conscription while they and their families remained deprived of their civil rights.

Hoshizaki refused to report for his pre-induction physical examination. On March 26, 1944, he was arrested by the Federal Bureau of Investigation. He was subsequently tried with 62 other Heart Mountain draft resisters in federal court in Cheyenne, Wyoming. The men were convicted of violating the Selective Service Act, and Hoshizaki received a three-year prison sentence. He was imprisoned at McNeil Island Penitentiary and released in 1946 after, approximately two years, when President Harry S. Truman pardoned Hoshizaki and other Japanese American wartime draft resisters on December 24, 1947.

While awaiting trial in 1944, Hoshizaki maintained a handwritten journal recording his experiences in detention and the legal proceedings. The journal was later preserved by the Heart Mountain Wyoming Foundation.

== Education and military service ==
Following his release, Hoshizaki returned to Los Angeles and attended Los Angeles City College, graduating in 1948. He continued his studies at the University of California, Los Angeles (UCLA), where he earned undergraduate and graduate degrees.

In 1953, after completing his master's, he was again drafted into the US Army. This time, he complied with the draft, explaining that the circumstances surrounding his imprisonment and the loss of his civil rights had changed. During his military service, Hoshizaki was assigned to duties at Camp Detrick, and later worked as a medical laboratory technician at Fort Hood. He received an honorable discharge. Using educational benefits provided through the G.I. Bill, he then returned to UCLA and earned a doctorate in botanical science in 1961.

== Scientific contributions ==
Hoshizaki's scientific research focused on plant physiology, biological rhythms, and the effects of environmental conditions on plant growth. In a 1962 article, Hoshizaki and botanist K. C. Hamner investigated the stem-bending response of Xanthium pensylvanicum to horizontal rotation. In 1969, the researchers published a study using computer analysis to examine rhythmic leaf movements in pinto bean plants. He later worked on space biology research related to plant growth under altered gravity conditions and in controlled environments such as spacecraft and other closed ecological systems. He worked as a research scientist at UCLA's Space Biology Laboratory and later at the Jet Propulsion Laboratory (JPL), operated by the California Institute of Technology. He retired from JPL in 1989. Hoshizaki also served as president of the Southern California Academy of Sciences.

== Remembrance of Japanese American Incarceration ==
In later life, Hoshizaki became involved in efforts to document and preserve the history of the incarceration of Japanese Americans during World War II by Franklin Delano Roosevelt, particularly the activities of the Heart Mountain draft resisters. He served on the board of directors of the Heart Mountain Wyoming Foundation, which operates the Heart Mountain Interpretive Center and works to preserve the history of the former incarceration site. In 2005, he was among former Japanese American students awarded belated high school diplomas in recognition of their interrupted education during World War II. He also addressed the graduation ceremony.

== Recognition ==
In April 2024, the Heart Mountain Foundation recognized Hoshizaki with its Douglas W. Nelson Lifetime Achievement Award for his contributions to the foundation and its historical preservation efforts.

On October 5, 2024, Hoshizaki received the Japanese Foreign Minister's Commendation at the Japanese American National Museum in Los Angeles. The commendation recognized his contributions to relations between Japan and the United States.

In November 2025, the Japanese government named Hoshizaki a recipient of the Order of the Rising Sun, Silver Rays, as part of its autumn decorations for foreign nationals. The government cited his contributions to the Japanese American community and to mutual understanding between Japan and the United States.

== Personal life ==
Hoshizaki married Barbara Joe Hoshizaki, a Chinese-American botanist and professor, in 1952. The couple had two children together and lived in Los Angeles. Barbara Hoshizaki died in 2012.
