= Bill Hosokawa =

American writer and journalist (1915–2007)

- Born: William Kunpei Hosokawa; January 30, 1915; Seattle, Washington, U.S.
- Died: November 9, 2007 (aged 92); Sequim, Washington, U.S.
- Occupations: Author; journalist; editor

William Kunpei Hosokawa (Japanese: 細川 勲平, January 30, 1915 – November 9, 2007) was an American writer and journalist.

Of Japanese descent, while interned at the Heart Mountain Relocation Center, he was the editor of the internment camp's newspaper, The Heart Mountain Sentinel. After being freed from the camp in 1943, Hosokawa worked as a columnist and editor at The Denver Post for 38 years. He retired from the newspaper industry in 1992, at the age of 77.

Hosokawa was also a prolific author. His best-selling book Nisei: The Quiet Americans (1969) chronicles the experiences of second-generation Japanese Americans, known as Nisei. Hosokawa published his final work, Colorado's Japanese Americans: From 1886 to the Present (2005), when he was 90 years old. His other books include Out of the Frying Pan (1998), Thirty-Five Years in the Frying Pan (1978), Thunder in the Rockies (1976), The Two Worlds of Jim Yoshida (1972), and The Uranium Age (1955).

Hosokawa was a recipient of the 2007 Civil Rights Award from the Anti-Defamation League.

== Early life ==
Bill Hosokawa was born on January 30, 1915, in Seattle, Washington. His parents were recent immigrants from Japan. His father, Setsugo Hosokawa, who immigrated from Hiroshima, Japan, in 1899 at the age of 15, worked as a migrant farm worker and a railroad section hand in Montana before running an employment agency for Japanese immigrants. His mother, Kimiyo (Omura) Hosokawa was an artist and worked as an elementary school teacher. Hosokawa's parents eventually settled in Seattle.

Hosokawa did not learn English until he began his education, and spoke Japanese at home. He also began going by the name William when he started school. In the summers, Hosokawa worked in Alaska at salmon canneries.

Hosokawa graduated from Garfield High School in Seattle, where his love of journalism was sparked by his time as a sports editor at his school paper. He enrolled at the University of Washington, where he earned his bachelor's degree in journalism in 1937. During his first year at UW, Hosokawa got his first job in journalism at the Seattle-based weekly, The Japanese-American Courier. In 1936, Hosokawa's professor and adviser strongly recommended that he abandon his journalism career goals, because no newsroom would hire a Japanese American.

== Career ==
After briefly working as a press secretary for the Japanese Consulate, Hosokawa and his new wife, Alice Miyake, moved to Singapore in 1938 because he was unable to land a job at any major metropolitan newspaper in the United States. He found a job working at an English-language newspaper, The Singapore Herald. At The Herald, Hosokawa reported on political turmoil around East Asia, travelling to China, Japan, and Manchukuo. Later, Hosokawa moved again to Shanghai, then under Japanese occupation, where he worked for Shanghai Times and The Far Eastern Review, which were both published in English and subject to Japanese scrutiny and censorship.

Hosokawa's wife returned to the U.S. in anticipation of the birth of their first child. Hosokawa did not see his son, Michael, until the baby was 14 months old. The family lived in Seattle in 1941, just before the Japanese attack on Pearl Harbor. Soon after the attack, President Franklin D. Roosevelt signed Executive Order 9066. As a result, Bill Hosokawa, his wife, and the couple's infant son were among 120,000 Japanese Americans on the West Coast who were sent to Japanese internment camps during World War II.

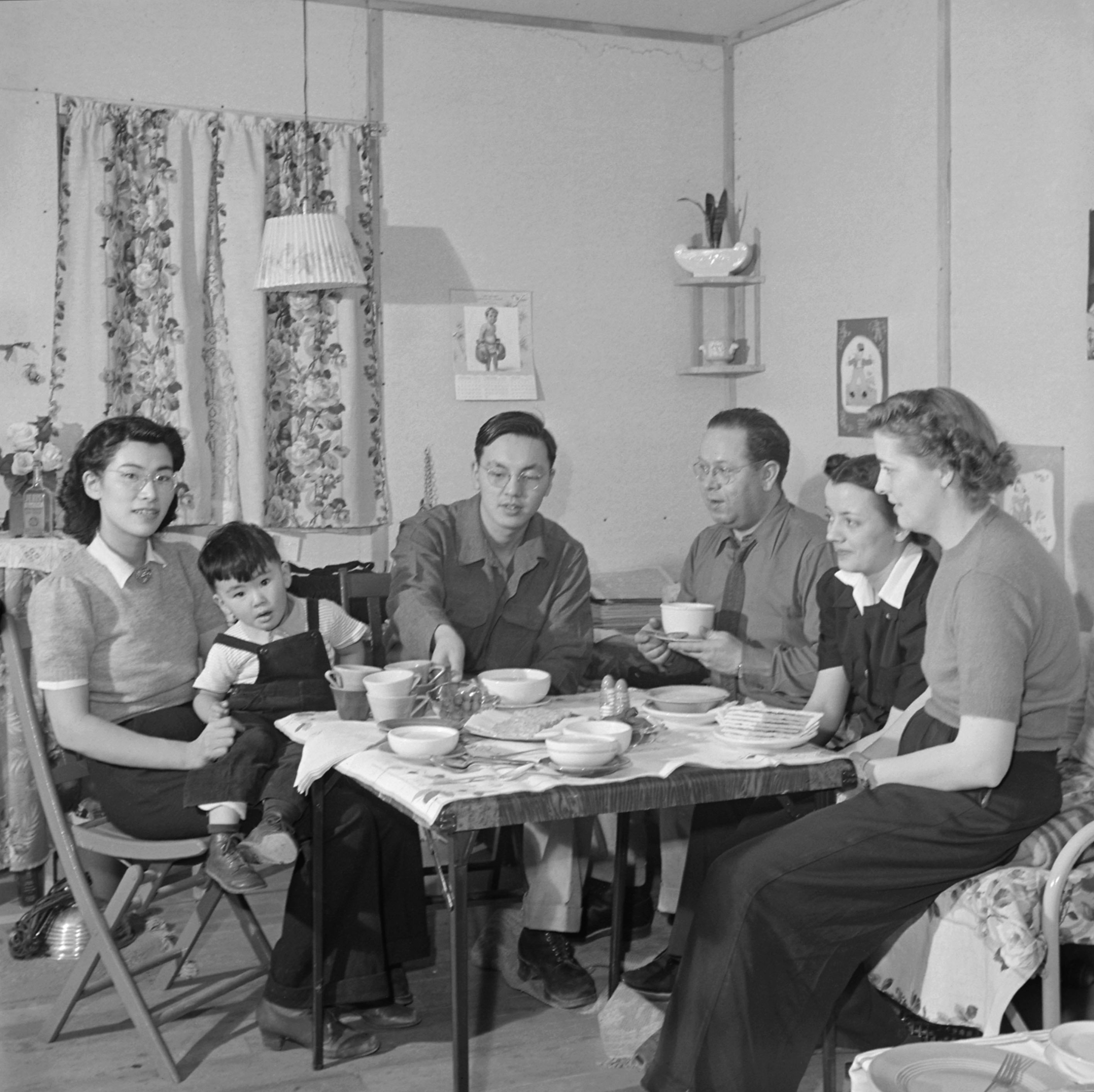
Hosokawa and his family (left) dine with three staff members, including mathematics teacher Julena Steinheider (far right), in his home at Heart Mountain

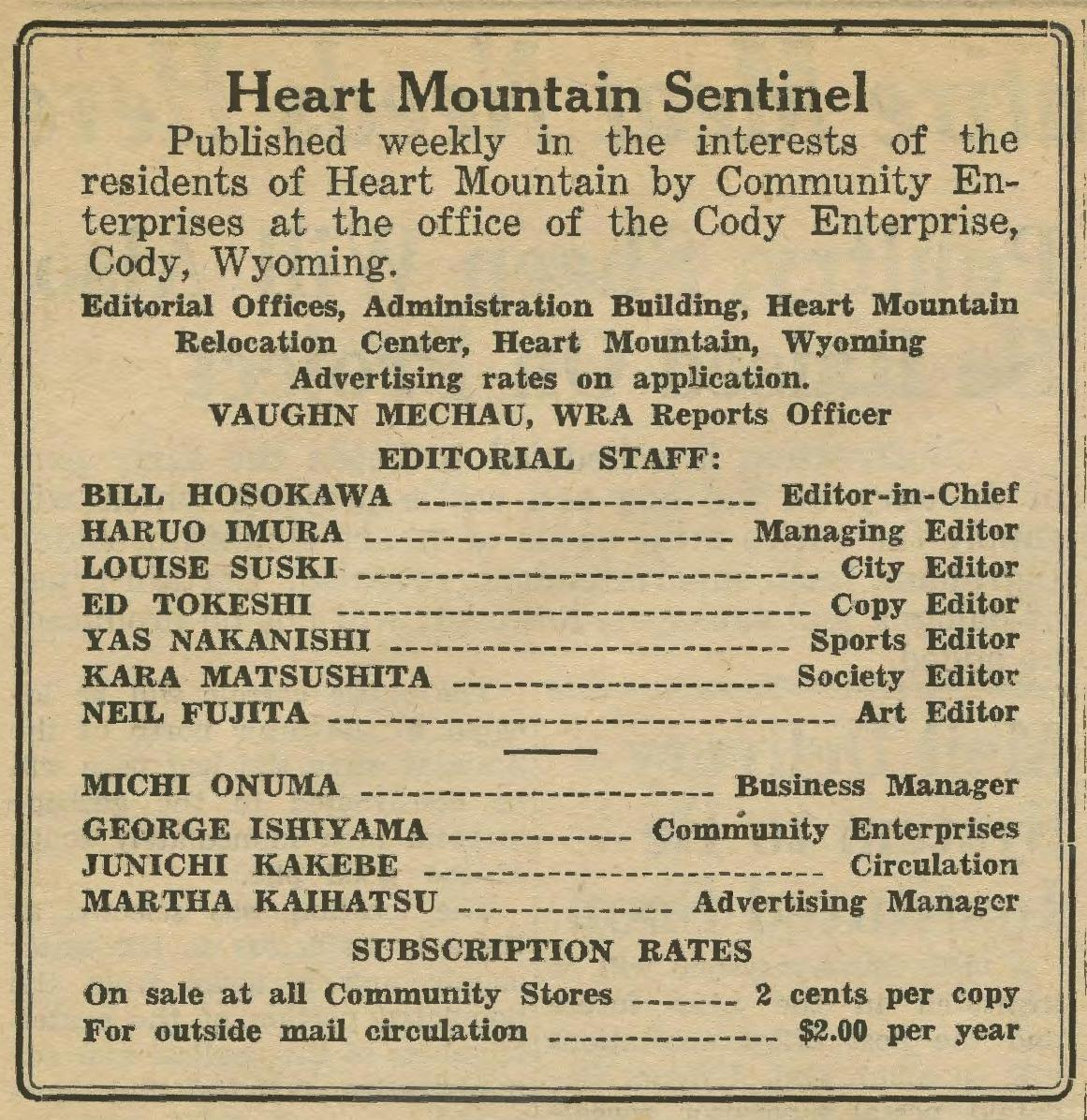
Heart Mountain Sentinel (Vol. 2, no. 1 – January 1, 1943)

The Hosokawa family was sent first to an assembly center at the Puyallup, Washington fairgrounds where the family, along with others from the Seattle area, lived in horse stalls while the camps were being built. The family was moved to the Heart Mountain Relocation Center in Wyoming when he was 27 years old. Hosokawa's later writings and news reports were influenced by his time spent interned with fellow second-generation Japanese Americans, who were known as Nisei, and their children, such as his son, who were known as Sansei. Since Hosokawa had journalism and writing experience, he was appointed the editor of the Heart Mountain Relocation Camp newspaper, The Heart Mountain Sentinel.

Hosokawa and his family were released from the internment camp in 1943, so he could work as a copy editor at The Des Moines Register. However, the experience of internment stayed with Hosokawa. For more than 40 years Hosokawa published a column in the Pacific Citizen entitled From The Frying Pan. His column offered his personal observations on the internment of Japanese Americans. His topics included bigotry and what he called "native fascism". His later entries sometimes focused on parenthood and travel, but he usually stayed on the topic of discrimination.

Hosokawa finally received a position with a major metropolitan newsroom after World War II, when he accepted a job with the Denver Post. The Post's new editor and publisher, Palmer Hoyt, used his new position to change the paper's image of being anti-Japanese. He employed Hosokawa, who served as a war correspondent for the Denver Post through the Korean War and Vietnam War. He also worked at the Post as a columnist, associate editor, and assistant managing editor at the paper. He also held the post of the editor of the Denver Post's Sunday magazine for 25 years. Hosokawa's time with The Post lasted nearly 40 years.

He left the Denver Post in 1984 and took a position as the reader ombudsman at the Rocky Mountain News, which was the arch-rival of the Denver Post. He remained with the Rocky Mountain News for eight years, until his retirement from the newspaper business in 1992.

For 58 years, from 1942 until 2000, Hosokawa published a regular column in the Japanese American Citizens League's (JACL) newspaper, The Pacific Citizen. Hosokawa also served as president of the JACL from 1958 to 1960. In his column, "Out of the Frying Pan," he wrote about topics including his own family life, civil rights, and Japanese American literature and culture including John Okada's 1957 novel No-No Boy, which told the story of a young adult Japanese American man throughout his life in Seattle following his internment.

Hosokawa worked to promote opportunities from Nisei and Sansei Japanese Americans during his career. Hosokawa wrote letters to President Franklin D. Roosevelt, First Lady Eleanor Roosevelt, and Secretary of State Cordell Hull in which he spoke about the loyalty of Japanese Americans in the midst of increased anti-Japanese sentiment. He defended and advocated for the Japanese American community during this time of distrust, convincing The Seattle Times to print a full page of photos depicting Japanese Americans engaged in everyday life to humanize them to readership, and to show that they were "peaceful, law-abiding," and "constructive" as told to Densho.

He often helped Japanese Americans, as well as recent immigrants, find jobs and counseling. According to the Rocky Mountain News, Hosokawa once even gave away his living room couch to a couple who needed it. He also worked to promote positive Japan–United States relations. He served as the Honorary Consul General of Japan for Colorado from 1976 until 1999. Even after he retired, Hosokawa was involved with organizations such as the Japan America Society of Colorado and the American Civil Liberties Union (ACLU).

== Career as a writer ==
Hosokawa's books and writings were deeply influenced by his experience as a Japanese American in the internment camps during World War II. His first major work, Nisei: The Quiet Americans, which explored this experience, became a national bestseller when it was published in 1969. Despite its commercial success, Nisei had an ambivalent reception. It was praised for reflecting the Japanese American community's spirit while also criticised for minimising the suffering of Japanese Americans during the war and perpetuated the model minority myth.

Hosokawa's writing also focused on his love of newspapers. His 1976 book, Thunder in the Rockies, chronicled the history of the Denver Post and Hoyt's leadership. His last book, Colorado's Japanese Americans: From 1886 to the Present, was published in 2005 when he was 90 years old and recorded the history of cities such as Denver in the context of Japanese resettlement after the war.

Some of his writings were inscribed onto the National Japanese American Memorial in Washington D.C. when the monument was dedicated in 2000.

=== Books written by Bill Hosokawa ===
- Nisei: The Quiet Americans (Paperback - April 2002)
- Old Man Thunder: Father of the Bullet Train (Hardcover - Dec 1997)
- Thunder in the Rockies: The Incredible Denver Post (Hardcover - 1976)
- Colorado's Japanese Americans: From 1886 to the Present (Hardcover - October 30, 2005)
- JACL: In Quest of Justice (Hardcover - Dec 1982)

=== Co-authored by Bill Hosokawa ===
- They Call Me Moses Masaoka: An American Saga by Mike Masaoka and Bill Hosokawa (Hardcover - Sep 1987)
- From Foe to Friend: One Man's Experience in Japanese/American Trade by Shinsaku Sogo and Bill Hosokawa (Hardcover - April 2002)
- East To America A History of the Japanese in the United States by Robert A. Wilson and Bill Hosokawa (Hardcover & Paperback - 1980)

== Honors ==
In 1987, Hosokawa received Japan's Order of the Rising Sun, Gold Rays with Neck Ribbon.

Hosokawa received on honorary Doctor of Humane Letters from the University of Denver in 1990 for his work in journalism and literature. In 2000, he was awarded the Whitehead Memorial prize for lifetime service advocating for victims of inequality. In 2003, the Asian American Journalists Association presented Hosokawa with its lifetime achievement award for his work. Hosokawa was a recipient of the 2007 Civil Rights Award from the Anti-Defamation League.

Additionally, the Japan Society of Colorado sponsors a fellowship in the name of Bill and Alice Hosokawa's name.

== Death ==
Bill Hosokawa died on November 9, 2007, at the age of 92 at the home of his daughter, Christie Harveson, in Sequim, Washington, where he had lived for the previous four months. Hosokawa's wife, Alice, died in 1998, while his youngest son, Peter, died in 2006. He was survived by his two daughters, Christie and Susan, his son, Michael, his brother, Robert Hosokawa, as well as eight grandchildren and seven great grandchildren. In a column published in the Denver Post on November 22, 2007, Hosokawa's colleague Fred Brown called him a "champion of civility, dignity and human rights".

A memorial service for Bill Hosokawa was held at the Gates Concert Hall at the University of Denver on February 17, 2008. The list of speakers honoring Hosokawa included Colorado Governor Bill Ritter and Ryozo Kato, the Ambassador of Japan to the United States.

== Ancestors ==
Ancestors of Bill Hosokawa

8. Yaohei Hosokawa
4. Zenshiro Hosokawa
2. Setsugo Hosokawa
5. Riu Shinkawa
1. William Kumpai Hosokawa
12. Bunemon Omura
6. Yosaku Omura
3. Kimiyo Omura
28. Yoshizaburo Kunihiro
14. Buhei Kunihiro
7. Uta Kunihiro
