= Bill Manbo =

Amateur photographer

Bill Manbo (1908–1992) was an amateur photographer who documented the incarceration of people of Japanese ancestry during World War II in Kodachrome photographs.

== Early life ==
Bill Manbo was born in Riverside, California in 1908. His parents were Kaichi and Tayo Manbo, Japanese immigrants originally from Hiroshima. As an adolescent, he lived in Hollywood and in Japan for nearly two years. He did not attend school in Japan and entered high school at the age of 17, graduating from Hollywood High School in 1929. After high school, he studied auto mechanics at Frank Wiggins Trade School. He met Mary Itaya, a dressmaking student, who would become his wife. After he and Mary married, Manbo opened a garage on Vine Street in Hollywood, where he painted and repaired cars. In 1940, Mary gave birth to their son Billy.

== Life during and after World War II ==
After Pearl Harbor was bombed, Mary's father Junzo Itaya was arrested by the FBI on March 13, 1942. He was taken to Tuna Canyon Detention Camp in Tujunga and then to an enemy alien internment camp run by the Justice Department in Santa Fe, NM. Bill, Mary and Billy were forced to leave their home on April 28, 1942. They went with Mary's mother and siblings to Santa Anita Assembly Center, although Junzo was still at Santa Fe. The family was then sent to the Heart Mountain Relocation Center. Manbo documented his family's experience at Heart Mountain through Kodachrome photography with a 35mm Zeiss Contax camera. He took approximately 192 photographs at Heart Mountain, which he sent back to Los Angeles for processing. He started working at the Heart Mountain motor pool in late October 1942. In November 1944, he and his wife and son, Bill Manbo Jr., moved to Cleveland, Ohio, where Manbo worked in a factory. They eventually returned to California and settled in Hollywood. Manbo died in 1992.

== Exhibitions and books ==
In 2012, Eric Muller published Manbo's photographs in Colors of Confinement. An exhibit of his photographs was on display at the Japanese American National Museum.
