= James K. Okubo =

United States Army Medal of Honor recipient

James Kazuo Okubo
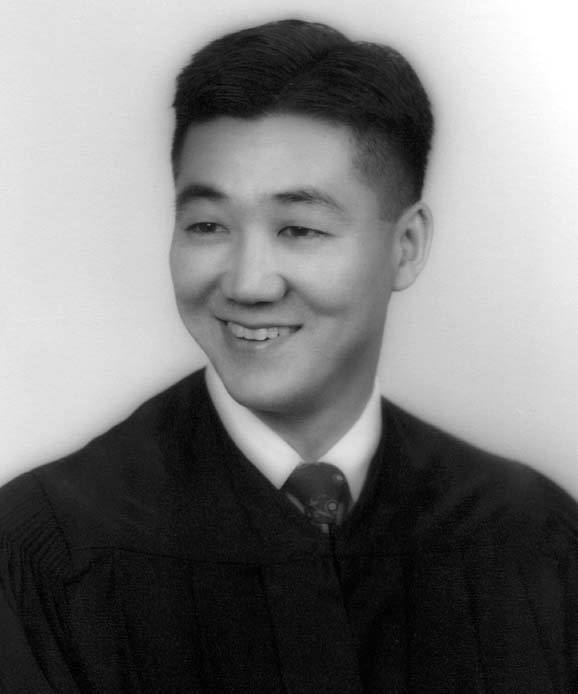
- Technician James Okubo
- Born: May 30, 1920; Anacortes, Washington
- Died: January 29, 1967 (aged 46); Detroit, Michigan
- Burial place: Woodlawn Cemetery, Detroit
- Military career
- Allegiance: United States of America
- Branch: United States Army
- Service years: 1943–1945
- Rank: Technician Fifth Grade
- Unit: 442nd Regimental Combat Team
- Conflicts: World War II
- Awards: Medal of Honor; Silver Star
- Other work: Dentist; Faculty, University of Detroit

James Kazuo Okubo (Japanese: 大久保 和男, May 30, 1920 – January 29, 1967) was a United States Army soldier. He was a posthumous recipient of the Medal of Honor for his actions in World War II.

== Early life ==
Okubo was born in Anacortes, Washington. and graduated from Bellingham High School. His parents were Japanese immigrant parents. He was a Nisei, which means that he was a second generation Japanese-American.

Following the signing of Executive Order 9066, the Okubo family was interned at the Tule Lake War Relocation Center in California; and then they relocated to the camp at Heart Mountain in Wyoming.

== Military service ==
Okubo joined the US Army in May 1943.

Okubo volunteered to be part of the all-Nisei 442nd Regimental Combat Team. This army unit was mostly made up of Japanese Americans from Hawaii and the mainland.

For his actions in October 1944, Okubo was awarded the Army's third-highest decoration, the Silver Star. After the war, he became a dentist in Detroit, and was killed in a car accident on January 29, 1967.

In the 1990s, there was a review of service records of Asian Americans who received the Silver Star during World War II. Okubo's award was one of those upgraded to the Medal of Honor and in a ceremony at the White House, on June 21, 2000, the formal presentation was made by President Bill Clinton. Twenty-one other Asian Americans also received the nation's highest military honor during the ceremony, but unfortunately, only seven were still alive to receive it.

Okubo's Medal of Honor recognized his conduct in frontline fighting in eastern France in 1944.

The words of Okubo's citation explain:

Technician Fifth Grade James K. Okubo distinguished himself by extraordinary heroism in action on 28 and 29 October and 4 November 1944, in the Foret Domaniale de Champ, near Biffontaine, eastern France. On 28 October, under strong enemy fire coming from behind mine fields and roadblocks, Technician Fifth Grade Okubo, a medic, crawled 150 yards to within 40 yards of the enemy lines. Two grenades were thrown at him while he left his last covered position to carry back wounded comrades. Under constant barrages of enemy small arms and machine gun fire, he treated 17 men on 28 October and 8 more men on 29 October. On 4 November, Technician Fifth Grade Okubo ran 75 yards under grazing machine gun fire and, while exposed to hostile fire directed at him, evacuated and treated a seriously wounded crewman from a burning tank, who otherwise would have died. Technician Fifth Grade James K. Okubo's extraordinary heroism and devotion to duty are in keeping with the highest traditions of military service and reflect great credit on him, his unit, and the United States Army.

== Personal life and education ==
After high school , Okubo attended Western Washington University, where he participated in the ski and press clubs.

After the war, Okubo relocated his family to Michigan. There, he received his undergraduate degree at Wayne State University and acquired his dentistry degree from the University of Detroit, where he became a professor after establishing his practice.

== Awards and decorations ==

Badge	Combat Medical Badge		
1st row	Medal of Honor Upgraded from Silver Star	Bronze Star Medal	Army Good Conduct Medal
2nd row	American Campaign Medal	European–African–Middle Eastern Campaign Medal with 1 Campaign star	World War II Victory Medal

== Namesake ==
Okubo is the namesake of the Okubo Family Health Clinic at Joint Base Lewis-McChord in Washington.

The Okubo Barracks at the Fort Sam Houston in Texas are named after the Nisei soldier. The barracks are now used for wounded soldiers.

== See also ==
- List of Medal of Honor recipients
- List of Medal of Honor recipients for World War II
