= Doris Ota Saito =

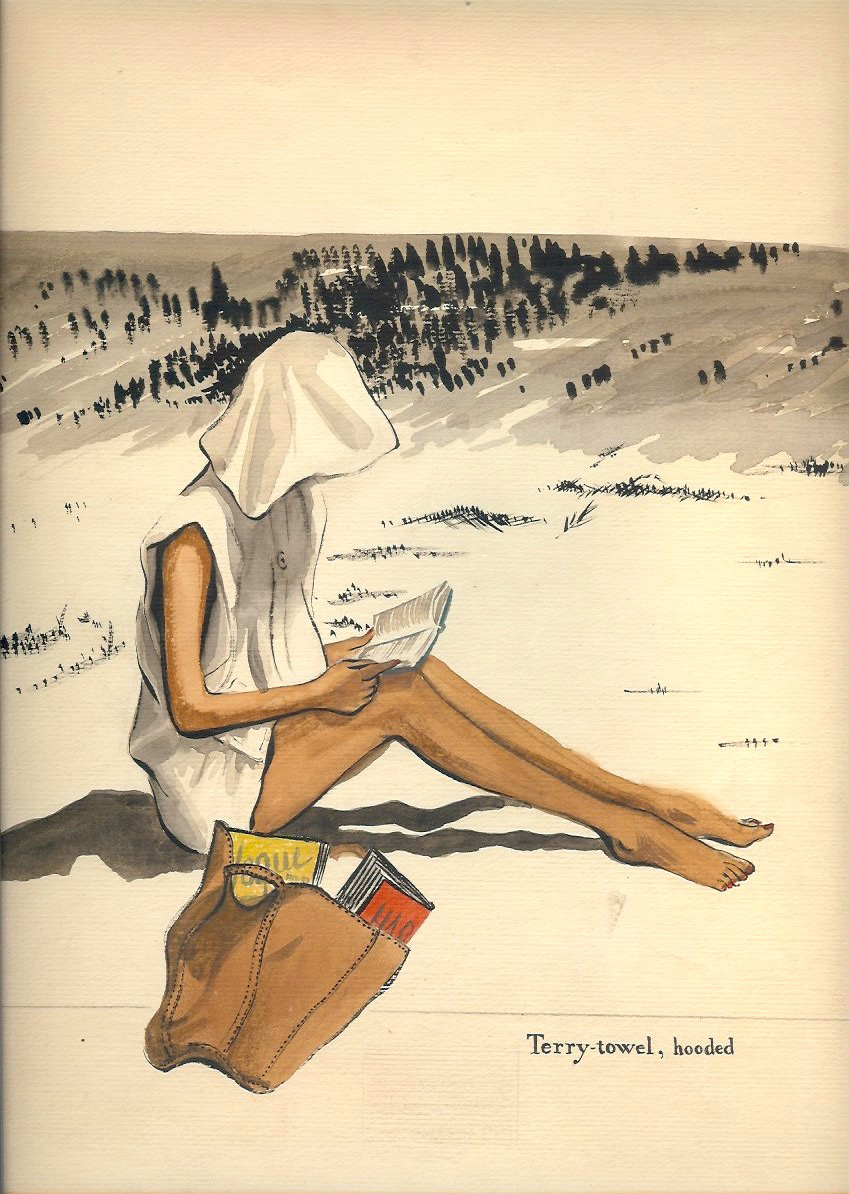
An illustration created by Saito during her time in Heart Mountain Relocation Center.

Doris Ota Saito (1923 – 2008) was a Japanese American artist. From 1942 to 1946, Saito created fashion illustrations featured in the Doris & Carl Saito Collection during her time spent at Heart Mountain Relocation Center. Her works show different styles of dress such as sportswear and formal attire in a multitude of mediums including chalk, paint, and pen.

After World War II, Ota married Carl Saito and resided in Arvada, Colorado until her death on November 17, 2008.
