= Joe Hayashi =

United States Army Medal of Honor recipient

Joe Ryo Hayashi
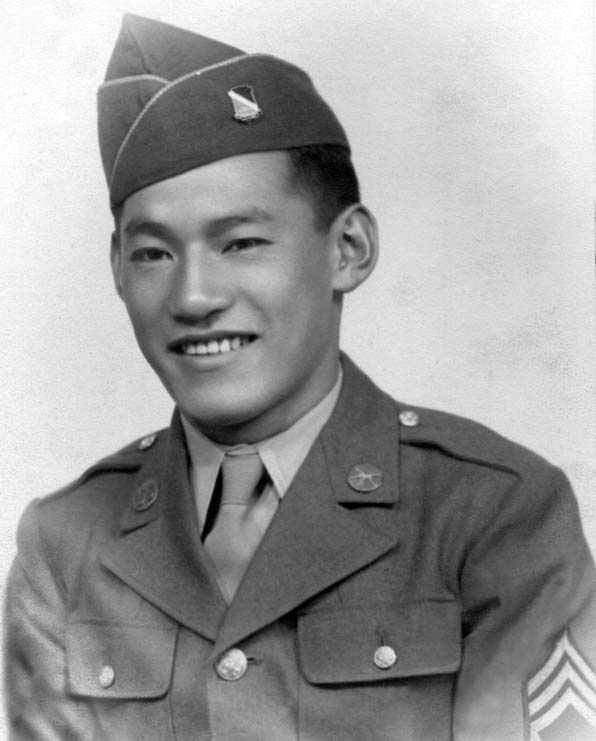
- Joe Hayashi, Medal of Honor recipient
- Born: August 14, 1920; Salinas, California
- Died: April 22, 1945 (aged 24) near Tendola, Italy
- Burial place: Evergreen Cemetery, Los Angeles, California
- Military career
- Allegiance: United States of America
- Branch: United States Army
- Service years: 1941 - 1945
- Rank: Staff Sergeant
- Unit: 442nd Regimental Combat Team
- Conflicts: World War II
- Awards: Medal of Honor

Joe Ryo Hayashi (Japanese: 林 良, August 14, 1920 – April 22, 1945) was a United States Army soldier. He is best known as a recipient of the United States military's highest decoration—the Medal of Honor—for his actions in World War II.

== Early life ==
Hayashi was born at Salinas, California. He was the son of immigrants who were born in Japan. He was a Nisei, which means that he was a second generation Japanese-American.

== Soldier ==
Working as a mechanic before the war, Hayashi enlisted in the Army from Los Angeles in May 1941.

Hayashi volunteered to be part of the all-Nisei 442nd Regimental Combat Team. This army unit was mostly made up of Japanese Americans from Hawaii and the mainland.

On April 20, 1945, near Tendola, Italy, Hayashi exposed himself to hostile fire in order to direct mortar fire onto enemy positions. Two days later, he single-handedly silenced three hostile machine guns but was killed while pursuing enemy soldiers.

For his actions during the battle, he was awarded the Army's second-highest decoration, the Distinguished Service Cross. A 1990s review of service records for Asian Americans who received the Distinguished Service Cross during World War II led to Hayashi's award being upgraded to the Medal of Honor. In a ceremony at the White House on June 21, 2000, his surviving family was presented with his Medal of Honor by President Bill Clinton. Twenty-one other Asian Americans also received the medal during the ceremony, all but seven of them posthumously.

Hayashi, aged 24 at his death, was buried in Evergreen Cemetery, Los Angeles, California. He was posthumously re-promoted to Sergeant.

== Medal of Honor citation ==
Hayashi's official Medal of Honor citation reads:

Private Joe Hayashi distinguished himself by extraordinary heroism in action on 20 and 22 April 1945, near Tendola, Italy. On 20 April 1945, ordered to attack a strongly defended hill that commanded all approaches to the village of Tendola, Private Hayashi skillfully led his men to a point within 75 yards of enemy positions before they were detected and fired upon. After dragging his wounded comrades to safety, he returned alone and exposed himself to small arms fire in order to direct and adjust mortar fire against hostile emplacements. Boldly attacking the hill with the remaining men of his squad, he attained his objective and discovered that the mortars had neutralized three machine guns, killed 27 men, and wounded many others. On 22 April 1945, attacking the village of Tendola, Private Hayashi maneuvered his squad up a steep, terraced hill to within 100 yards of the enemy. Crawling under intense fire to a hostile machine gun position, he threw a grenade, killing one enemy soldier and forcing the other members of the gun crew to surrender. Seeing four enemy machine guns delivering deadly fire upon other elements of his platoon, he threw another grenade, destroying a machine gun nest. He then crawled to the right flank of another machine gun position where he killed four enemy soldiers and forced the others to flee. Attempting to pursue the enemy, he was killed by a burst of machine pistol fire. The dauntless courage and exemplary leadership of Private Hayashi enabled his company to attain its objective. Private Hayashi's extraordinary heroism and devotion to duty are in keeping with the highest traditions of military service and reflect great credit on him, his unit, and the United States Army.

== Awards and Decorations ==

Badge	Combat Infantryman Badge		
1st row	Medal of Honor		Bronze Star Medal
2nd row	Purple Heart	Army Good Conduct Medal	American Defense Service Medal
3rd row	American Campaign Medal	European–African–Middle Eastern Campaign Medal with 1 campaign star	World War II Victory Medal

== See also ==
- List of Medal of Honor recipients
- List of Medal of Honor recipients for World War II
