= Heart Mountain (Wyoming) =

Mountain in Wyoming, United States

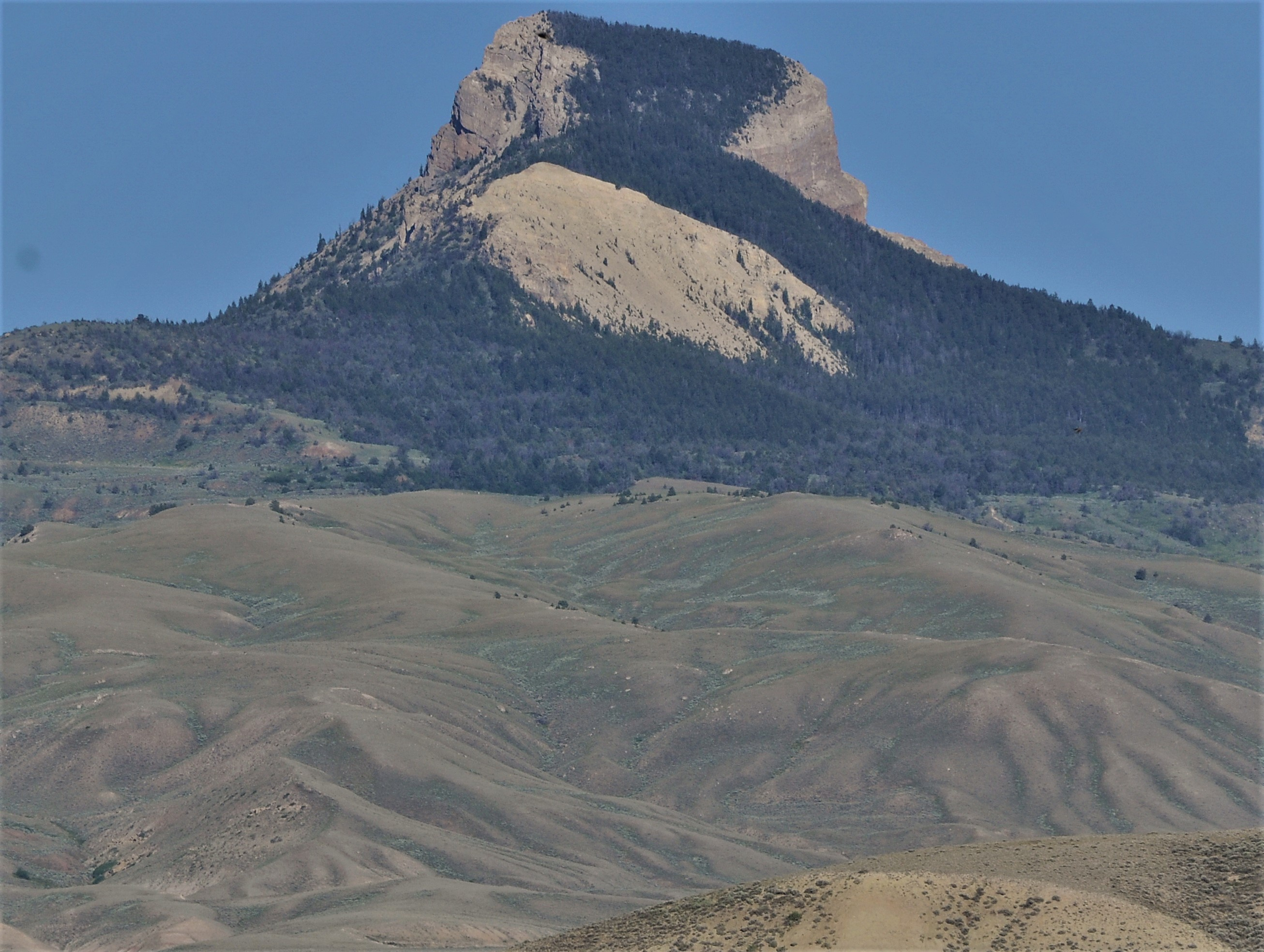

Highest point
- Elevation: 8,123 ft (2,476 m)
- Prominence: 2,163 ft (659 m)
- Coordinates: 44°39′56″N 109°07′09″W

Geography
- Location within Wyoming Location within the United States
- Location: Park County, Wyoming, U.S.
- Topo map: USGS Heart Mountain

Geology
- Mountain type: Limestone

Heart Mountain is an 8,123-foot (2,476 m) klippe just north of Cody in the U.S. state of Wyoming, rising from the floor of the Bighorn Basin.

== Name ==
The name Heart Mountain originates with the Lewis and Clark expedition. In the Crow language, its name translated as "Buffalo heart mountain". Local Indian legends noted the heart-like shape of the mountain. William Clark and one of the hunters and guides on the expedition, George Drouillard, drew on the Indian legend to name the mountain, but chose to refer to the mountain in English, rather than the corresponding Indian name.

Other sources give the Crow name as Ihkapíliish Iilapxe ("Foretops Father").

=== Hart Mountain ===
Heart Mountain is occasionally referred to as Hart Mountain. The name Hart Mountain originates with George Drouillard, who was a hunter and interpreter with the Lewis and Clark expedition. Both he and William Clark visited the upper Big Horn Basin and drew maps of the area. The very first map of the area was Clark’s 1805 map, which labelled it as "Heart Mountain" but mistakenly showed Heart Mountain on the south side of the Stinking Water River (Shoshone River). After seeing a published map of the mistake Clark corrected his map, based on information he received from George Drouillard. Drouillard's 1809 map identified the mountain in the correct location, and clearly labeled it "Hart Mountain". George Drouillard and William Clark were both on the same expedition, and have the same Indian legend for the name of Heart Mountain. "Hart Mountain" is not named after a person, but is a variant spelling of Heart Mountain, originating with and directly attributable to the 1809 map made by explorer, hunter and interpreter George Drouillard.

== Geology ==
The mountain is composed of limestone and dolomite of Ordovician through Mississippian age (about 500 to 350 million years old), but it rests on the Willwood Formation, rocks that are about 55 million years old—the rocks on the summit of Heart Mountain are almost 300 million years older than the rocks at the base.

The carbonate rocks that form Heart Mountain were deposited on a basement of ancient (more than 2.5 billion years old) granite when the area was covered by a large shallow tropical sea. Up until 50 million years ago, these rocks lay about 25 miles (40 kilometers) to the northwest, where the eastern Absaroka Range now stands.

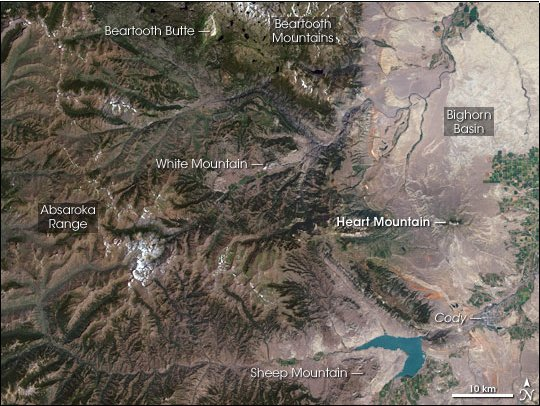
Satellite photo of Heart Mountain and the surrounding area

Between 75 and 50 million years ago, a period of mountain-building called the Laramide Orogeny caused uplift of the Beartooth Range and subsidence of the Bighorn and Absaroka Basins. Just south of the Beartooth Range, this orogeny uplifted an elongate, somewhat lower plateau which sloped gently to the southeast toward the Bighorn Basin and to the south toward the Absaroka Basin. Immediately following this period of mountain-building, volcanic eruptions began to form the now extinct volcanoes of the Absaroka Range that lie to the south of the Beartooths and extend into Yellowstone National Park. Between 50 and 48 million years ago, a sheet of rock about 500 square miles (1,300 square kilometers) in area detached from the plateau south of the Beartooths and slid tens of kilometers to the southeast and south into the Bighorn and Absaroka Basins. This sheet, consisting of Ordovician through Mississippian carbonate rocks and overlying Absaroka volcanic rocks, was probably originally about 2.5 to 3.1 miles (4 to 5 km) thick. Although the slope was less than two degrees, the front of the landslide traveled at least 25 miles (40 km). This is by far the largest rockslide known on land on the surface of the Earth and is comparable in scale to some of the largest known submarine landslides.

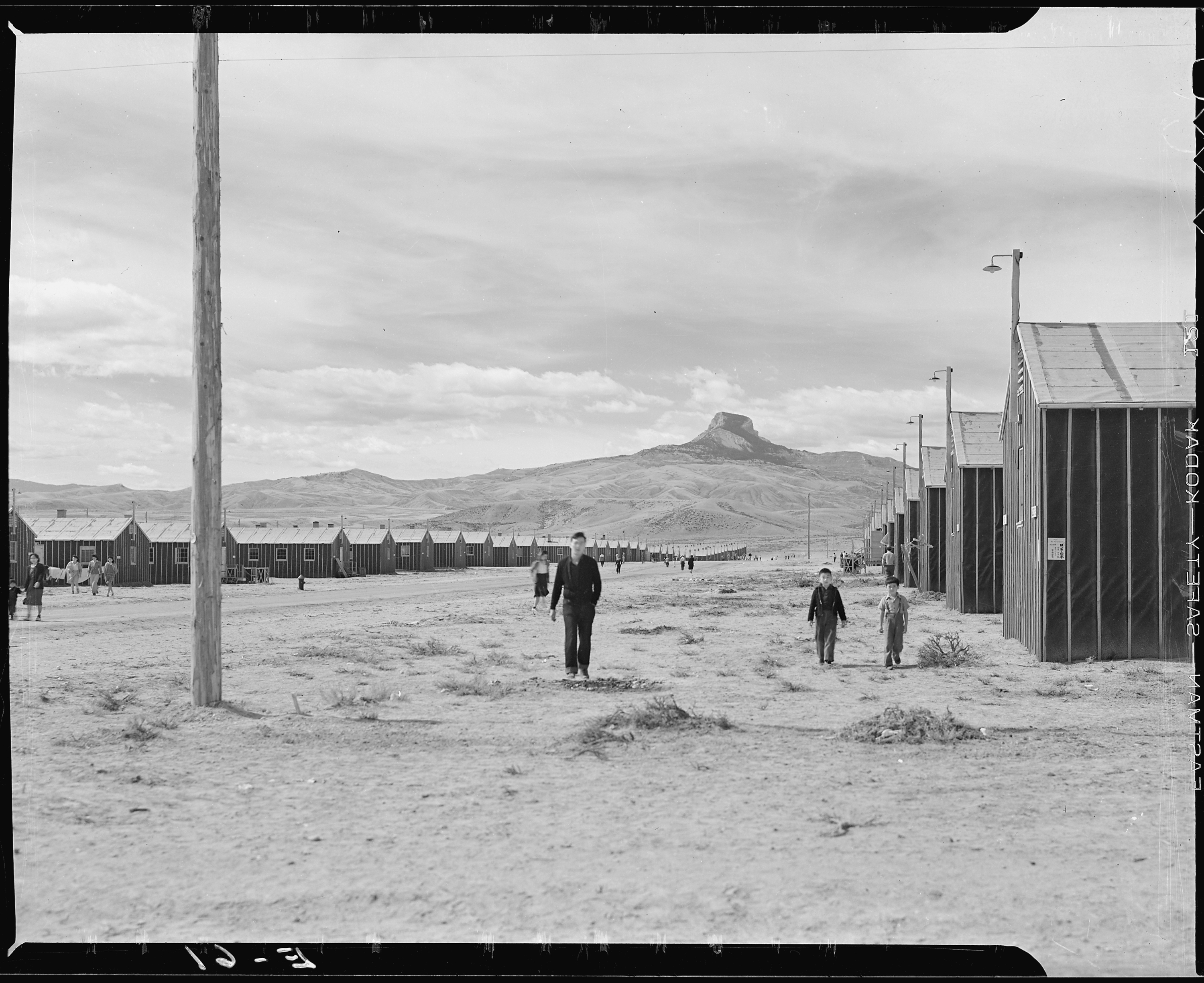
Heart Mountain towers at the end of "F" Street, the main thoroughfare of the Heart Mountain War Relocation Center (August 28, 1942).

Many models have been proposed to explain what caused this huge slab of rock to start sliding and what allowed it to slide so far on such a low slope, fragmenting, thinning and extending as it went. Most geologists who have worked in the area agree that Absaroka volcanism played a role in the sliding and many suggest that a major volcanic or steam explosion initiated the movement. Another model involves the injection of numerous igneous dikes, with the resulting heating of water within pores in the rocks causing an increase in pressure which then initiated the sliding. Some geologists have suggested that hot pressurized water (hydrothermal fluids) derived from a volcano which sat north of Cooke City, Montana lubricated the sliding surface. Another possibility is that once the slide was moving, friction heated the limestone along the sliding surface, creating pseudotachylite, which then further broke down into calcium oxide and carbon dioxide gas (or supercritical fluid). The gas supported the slide in the same way that air pressure supports a hovercraft, allowing the slide to move easily down the very low slope. When the rockslide stopped, the carbon dioxide cooled and recombined with calcium oxide to form the cement-like carbonate rock now found in the fault zone. The consensus favors catastrophic sliding and calculations suggest that the front of the sliding mass may have advanced at a speed of over 100 miles per hour (160 km/h), meaning that the mountain traveled to its present location in approximately 30 minutes. (Note: A 2025 installment of the xkcd webcomic derived its humor from the contrast between this improbable-sounding theory and the inability to develop a better one.)

In the 48 million years since the slide occurred, erosion has removed most of the portion of the slide sheet which moved out into the Bighorn Basin, leaving just one big block of carbonate rocks—Heart Mountain. Farther south, a large block of carbonate rock forms Sheep Mountain, which lies just south of the road that goes from Cody into Yellowstone Park. Some of the best views of the sliding surface, called the Heart Mountain fault, can be found along the Chief Joseph Highway (Wyoming Highway 296). The fault is particularly well exposed in Cathedral Cliffs, where it appears as a remarkably straight and nearly horizontal line just above a 7-to-10-foot (2 to 3 m) cliff.

== See also ==
- Storegga Slide – Prehistoric landslide off Norway
- Chief Mountain – Mountain in Montana, United States
- Heart Mountain Relocation Center, a nearby Japanese internment camp named after the mountain – Historic place in Wyoming, United States
