= List of American films of 1991 =

This is a list of American films released in 1991.

== Box office ==
The highest-grossing American films released in 1991, by domestic box office gross revenue, are as follows:

Highest-grossing films of 1991
Rank	Title	Distributor	Domestic gross
1	Terminator 2: Judgment Day	TriStar Pictures	$204,843,345
2	Robin Hood: Prince of Thieves	Warner Bros.	$165,493,908
3	Beauty and the Beast	Walt Disney Studios Motion Pictures	$145,863,363
4	The Silence of the Lambs	Orion	$130,742,922
5	City Slickers	Columbia Pictures	$124,033,791
6	Hook	TriStar Pictures	$119,654,823
7	The Addams Family	Paramount Pictures	$113,502,426
8	Sleeping with the Enemy	20th Century Fox	$101,599,005
9	Father of the Bride	Walt Disney Studios Motion Pictures	$89,325,780
10	The Naked Gun 2½: The Smell of Fear	Paramount Pictures	$86,930,411

== January–March ==
Opening		Title	Production company	Cast and crew	Ref.
J A N U A R Y	11	Lionheart	Universal Pictures	Sheldon Lettich (director/screenplay); S.N. Warren, Jean-Claude Van Damme (screenplay); Jean-Claude Van Damme, Harrison Page, Deborah Rennard, Brian Thompson, Lisa Pelikan, Ashley Johnson, Ash Adams, Voyo Goric, Michel Qissi, Tony Halme, Clement von Franckenstein, Abdel Qissi	
J A N U A R Y	11	Not Without My Daughter	Metro-Goldwyn-Mayer	Brian Gilbert (director); David W. Rintels (screenplay); Sally Field, Alfred Molina, Sheila Rosenthal, Roshan Seth, Sarah Badel, Mony Rey, Georges Corraface	
J A N U A R Y	11	Ski School	Moviestore Entertainment	Damian Lee (director); David Mitchell (screenplay); Dean Cameron, Tom Breznahan, Stuart Fratkin, Darlene Vogel, Ava Fabian, Patrick Labyorteaux, Mark Thomas Miller, Spencer Rochfort, John Pyper-Ferguson, Charlie Spradling, Gaetana Korbin, Mark Brandon, Johnny Askwith	
J A N U A R Y	11	Warlock	Trimark Pictures	Steve Miner (director); D.T. Twohy (screenplay); Julian Sands, Lori Singer, Richard E. Grant, Mary Woronov, Allan Miller, Anna Levine, Kay E. Kuter, Ian Abercrombie, Frank Renzulli, Rob Paulsen, Brandon Call, Kevin O'Brien, Richard Kuss	
J A N U A R Y	18	Cadence	New Line Cinema / Republic Pictures	Martin Sheen (director); Dennis Shryack (screenplay); Charlie Sheen, Martin Sheen, Laurence Fishburne, F. Murray Abraham, Blu Mankuma, Michael Beach, Harry Stewart, John Toles-Bey, James Marshall, Ramon Estevez, Jay Brazeau, Samantha Langevin, Ken Douglas, Weston McMillan, David Michael O'Neill, Allan Lysell, Don S. Davis, Roark Critchlow, Alec Burden, Steven Hilton, Joe Lowry, Lochlyn Munro, Jennifer Griffin, Brent Stait, Christopher Judge, Matt Clark	
J A N U A R Y	18	Eve of Destruction	Orion Pictures	Duncan Gibbins (director/screenplay); Yale Udoff (screenplay); Gregory Hines, Renée Soutendijk, Kurt Fuller, Michael Greene, John M. Jackson, Loren Haynes	
J A N U A R Y	18	Flight of the Intruder	Paramount Pictures	John Milius (director); Robert Dillon, David Shaber (screenplay); Danny Glover, Willem Dafoe, Brad Johnson, Rosanna Arquette, Tom Sizemore, J. Kenneth Campbell, Jared Chandler, Dann Florek, Madison Mason, Ving Rhames, Christopher Rich, Douglas Roberts, John Corbett, Scott N. Stevens, Justin Williams, Fred Dalton Thompson, David Schwimmer, David Wilson	
J A N U A R Y	18	Men of Respect	Columbia Pictures	William Reilly (director/screenplay); John Turturro, Katherine Borowitz, Dennis Farina, Peter Boyle, Rod Steiger, Stanley Tucci, Carl Capotorto, Michael Badalucco, Robert Modica, David Thornton, Dan Grimaldi, Joseph Carberry, Richard Petrocelli, Edward Gallardo, Joseph Ragno	
J A N U A R Y	18	Once Around	Universal Pictures	Lasse Hallström (director); Malia Scotch Marmo (screenplay); Richard Dreyfuss, Holly Hunter, Danny Aiello, Laura San Giacomo, Gena Rowlands, Roxanne Hart, Danton Stone, Tim Guinee, Greg Germann, Griffin Dunne	
J A N U A R Y	18	White Fang	Walt Disney Pictures	Randal Kleiser (director); Jeanne Rosenberg, Nick Thiel, David Fallon (screenplay); Ethan Hawke, Klaus Maria Brandauer, Seymour Cassel, Susan Hogan, James Remar, Pius Savage, Bill Moseley, Clint Youngreen, Suzanne Kent, Michael Davis Lally, Aaron Hotch, Diane E. Benson, Jed the Wolfdog, Bart the Bear	
J A N U A R Y	25	Too Much Sun	CineTel Films	Robert Downey Sr. (director/screenplay); Laura Ernst, Al Schwartz (screenplay); Allan Arbus, Robert Downey Jr., Howard Duff, Lara Harris, James Hong, Eric Idle, Jon Korkes, Ralph Macchio, Andrea Martin, Leo Rossi, Jennifer Rubin, Heidi Swedberg	
J A N U A R Y	26	Prison Stories: Women on the Inside	HBO Showcase	Donna Deitch, Joan Micklin Silver, Penelope Spheeris (directors); Dick Beebe, Martin Jones, Marlane Meyer, Jule Selbo (screenplay); Rae Dawn Chong, Lolita Davidovich, Annabella Sciorra, Talisa Soto, Rachel Ticotin, Leontine Guilliard, Debi Parker, Sharon Schaffer, Sandy Martin, Robert Wallach, Terri Hanauer, Edwin Maldonado Jr., Raymond Cruz, Lorraine Morin-Torre, Jennifer Rhodes, Kevin Duffis, Myra Turley, Edith Fields, Virginia Keehne, Elisabeth Moss, Daniel Riordan, Joel Swetow, Gillian Bagwell, Marlon Taylor, John Freeland, Mae E. Campbell, Lois DeBanzie, Paul Collins, Al White, Moe Bertran, Ken Butler, Silvana Gallardo, Francesca P. Roberts, Kimberly Scott, Grace Zabriskie	
F E B R U A R Y	1	Meet the Applegates	New World Pictures / Triton Pictures	Michael Lehmann (director/screenplay); Redbeard Simmons (screenplay); Ed Begley Jr., Stockard Channing, Dabney Coleman, Robert Jayne, Camille Cooper, Glenn Shadix, Susan Barnes, Roger Aaron Brown, Lee Garlington	
F E B R U A R Y	1	Popcorn	Studio Three Film Corporation	Mark Herrier (director); Alan Ormsby (screenplay); Jill Schoelen, Tom Villard, Dee Wallace, Derek Rydall, Malcolm Danare, Kelly Jo Minter, Tony Roberts, Ray Walston, Barry Jenner, Cindy Breakspeare, Ivette Soler, Elliott Hurst, Freddie Marie Simpson	
F E B R U A R Y	1	Queens Logic	New Visions Pictures	Steve Rash (director); Tony Spiridakis, Joseph W. Savino (screenplay); Kevin Bacon, Jamie Lee Curtis, Linda Fiorentino, John Malkovich, Joe Mantegna, Ken Olin, Tony Spiridakis, Tom Waits, Chloe Webb, Michael Zelniker, Kelly Bishop, Terry Kinney	
F E B R U A R Y	1	Run	Hollywood Pictures	Geoff Burrowes (director); Dennis Shryack, Michael Blodgett (screenplay); Patrick Dempsey, Kelly Preston, Ken Pogue, Alan C. Peterson	
F E B R U A R Y	8	L.A. Story	Tri-Star Pictures / Carolco Pictures	Mick Jackson (director); Steve Martin (screenplay); Steve Martin, Victoria Tennant, Richard E. Grant, Marilu Henner, Sarah Jessica Parker, Kevin Pollak, Sam McMurray, Patrick Stewart, Iman, Chevy Chase, Woody Harrelson, Paula Abdul, Martin Lawrence, Rick Moranis, Terry Jones	
F E B R U A R Y	8	The NeverEnding Story II: The Next Chapter	Warner Bros. Pictures	George T. Miller (director); Karin Howard (screenplay); Jonathan Brandis, Kenny Morrison, Clarissa Burt, John Wesley Shipp, Alexandra Johnes, Thomas Hill, Donald Arthur, Martin Umbach	
F E B R U A R Y	8	Rosencrantz & Guildenstern Are Dead	Cinecom Pictures / Brandenberg / WNET Channel 13 New York	Tom Stoppard (director/screenplay); Gary Oldman, Tim Roth, Richard Dreyfuss, Iain Glen, Ian Richardson, Donald Sumpter, Joanna Miles, Joanna Roth, John Burgess, Sven Medvešek	
F E B R U A R Y	8	Sleeping with the Enemy	20th Century Fox	Joseph Ruben (director); Ronald Bass (screenplay); Julia Roberts, Patrick Bergin, Kevin Anderson, Elizabeth Lawrence, Harley Venton, Sandi Shackelford, Bonnie Johnson	
F E B R U A R Y	14	The Silence of the Lambs	Orion Pictures	Jonathan Demme (director); Ted Tally (screenplay); Jodie Foster, Anthony Hopkins, Scott Glenn, Ted Levine, Anthony Heald, Brooke Smith, Diane Baker, Kasi Lemmons, Frankie Faison, Tracey Walter, Charles Napier, Dan Butler, Paul Lazar, Ron Vawter, Roger Corman, Chris Isaak, Harry Northup, Don Brockett, Kenneth Utt, Adelle Lutz, Obba Babatundé, George Michael, Cynthia Ettinger, Brent Hinkley, Andre Blake, Daniel von Bargen, Lauren Roselli, Robert W. Castle, Gary Goetzman, George A. Romero, Edward Saxon, Ted Tally	
F E B R U A R Y	15	King Ralph	Universal Pictures	David S. Ward (director/screenplay); John Goodman, Peter O'Toole, John Hurt, Camille Coduri, Ann Beach, Jack Smethurst, Richard Griffiths, Leslie Phillips, James Villiers, Joely Richardson, Niall O'Brien, Julian Glover, Judy Parfitt, Leo Jean, Ed Stobart, Rudolph Walker, Michael Johnson, Tim Seely	
F E B R U A R Y	15	Nothing but Trouble	Warner Bros. Pictures	Dan Aykroyd (director/screenplay); Chevy Chase, Dan Aykroyd, John Candy, Demi Moore, Valri Bromfield, Taylor Negron, Bertila Damas, Raymond J. Barry, Brian Doyle-Murray, John Wesley, Peter Aykroyd, Daniel Baldwin, Karla Tamburrelli, Earl Dixon, P.H. Aykroyd, Robert K. Weiss, Vera Sola, Roger Grimsby, Digital Underground	
F E B R U A R Y	22	Bride of Re-Animator	50th Street Films / Wild Street Pictures / Re-Animator II Productions	Brian Yuzna (director); Woody Keith, Rick Fry (screenplay); Jeffrey Combs, Bruce Abbott, Claude Earl Jones, Fabiana Udenio, David Gale, Kathleen Kinmont, Mel Stewart, Johnny Legend, Noble Craig, Irene Forrest, Michael Strasser, Mary Sheldon, Friday, Marge Turner, David Bynum, Kim Parker, Charles Schneider, Rebeca Recio, Jay Evans	
F E B R U A R Y	22	He Said, She Said	Paramount Pictures	Ken Kwapis, Marisa Silver (directors); Brian Hohlfeld (screenplay); Kevin Bacon, Elizabeth Perkins, Nathan Lane, Anthony LaPaglia, Sharon Stone, Stanley Anderson, Charlayne Woodard, Danton Stone, Phil Leeds, Rita Karin, Erika Alexander, Ashley Gardner, Damien Leake, Constance Shulman, Leon Russom, Steven Gilborn, Dana Andersen, Bruce MacVittie, George Martin, Tanya Berezin, David Cale, Mark Tymchyshyn, Van Dyke Parks, Leeza Gibbons, John Tesh, Paul Butler, M.K. Harris, Petie Perkins, Hope Miles, Maury Eframs, Claudia Silver	
F E B R U A R Y	22	Scenes from a Mall	Touchstone Pictures	Paul Mazursky (director/screenplay); Roger L. Simon (screenplay); Bette Midler, Woody Allen, Bill Irwin, Daren Firestone, Rebecca Nickels, Paul Mazursky, Marc Shaiman, Joan Delaney, Fabio, Dealin LaValley	
M A R C H	1	The Doors	Tri-Star Pictures / Carolco Pictures	Oliver Stone (director/screenplay); J. Randall Johnson (screenplay); Val Kilmer, Meg Ryan, Kyle MacLachlan, Frank Whaley, Kevin Dillon, Michael Wincott, Michael Madsen, Josh Evans, Dennis Burkley, Billy Idol, Kathleen Quinlan, John Densmore, Jerry Sturm, Sean Stone, Floyd Red Crow Westerman, Wes Studi, Steve Reevis, Bernard Telsey, Bruce MacVittie, Andy Lauer, Harmonica Fats, Kelly Hu, Josie Bissett, Fiona, Robert LuPone, Paul Rothchild, John Capodice, Eric Burdon, Debi Mazar, Mark Moses, Deborah Falconer, Will Jordan, Sam Whipple, Charlie Spradling, Lisa Edelstein, Erik Dellums, Mimi Rogers, Jennifer Rubin, Paul Williams, Costas Mandylor, Christina Fulton, Crispin Glover, Claire Stansfield, Karina Lombard, Christopher Lawford, Bill Graham, Titus Welliver, Eagle-Eye Cherry, Bonnie Bramlett, Rodney A. Grant, Brad Weston, Hawthorne James, Patricia Kennealy-Morrison, Keith Reddin, Billy Vera, Allan Graf, Jack McGee, Bill Kunstler, Peter Crombie, Annie McEnroe, Arthur Bremer, William Calley, Franco Columbu, Phil Fondacaro, Tim Guinee, Adolf Hitler, Ethel Kennedy, Robert F. Kennedy, Martin Luther King, Robby Krieger, Charles Manson, Richard Nixon, Oliver Stone, Julie Strain, Sky Saxon, Jennifer Tilly, John Trujillo, George Wallace	
M A R C H	1	My Heroes Have Always Been Cowboys	The Samuel Goldwyn Company	Stuart Rosenberg (director); Joel Don Humphreys (screenplay); Scott Glenn, Kate Capshaw, Ben Johnson, Gary Busey, Tess Harper, Balthazar Getty, Mickey Rooney, Clarence Williams III, Bill Clymer, Dub Taylor	
M A R C H	1	Shipwrecked	Walt Disney Pictures	Nils Gaup (director/screenplay); Bob Foss, Greg Dinner, Nick Thiel (screenplay); Stian Smestad, Gabriel Byrne, Trond Peter Stamsø Munch, Louisa Milwood-Haigh, Knut Walle, Harald Brenna	
M A R C H	6	Closet Land	Universal Pictures	Radha Bharadwaj (director/screenplay); Madeleine Stowe, Alan Rickman	
M A R C H	8	American Ninja 4: The Annihilation	Cannon Group	Cedric Sundstrom (director); David Geeves (screenplay); Michael Dudikoff, David Bradley, James Booth, Dwayne Alexandre, Ken Gampu, Robin Stille, Franz Dobrowsky, Ron Smerczak, Kely McClung, Jody Abrahams	
M A R C H	8	The Hard Way	Universal Pictures / The Badham/Cohen Group	John Badham (director); Daniel Pyne, Lem Dobbs (screenplay); Michael J. Fox, James Woods, Stephen Lang, Annabella Sciorra, John Capodice, Luis Guzmán, LL Cool J, Mary Mara, Delroy Lindo, Conrad Roberts, Christina Ricci, Penny Marshall, George Cheung, Lewis Black, Kathy Najimy, Dante Smith, Bill Cobbs, John Costelloe, Johnny Sanchez, Karen Lynn Gorney, Ed Setrakian, Michael Badalucco, Bryant Gumbel, Fabio	
M A R C H	8	La Femme Nikita	Gaumont	Luc Besson (director/screenplay); Anne Parillaud, Jean-Hugues Anglade, Tchéky Karyo, Jeanne Moreau, Jean Bouise, Jean Reno, Philippe Leroy, Roland Blanche, Jacques Boudet	
M A R C H	8	New Jack City	Warner Bros. Pictures	Mario Van Peebles (director); Thomas Lee Wright, Barry Michael Cooper (screenplay); Wesley Snipes, Ice-T, Mario Van Peebles, Judd Nelson, Allen Payne, Chris Rock, Michael Michele, Bill Nunn, Russell Wong, Bill Cobbs, Christopher Williams, Vanessa Williams, Tracy Camilla Johns, Anthony DeSando, Nick Ashford, Phyllis Yvonne Stickney, Thalmus Rasulala, John Aprea, Fab 5 Freddy, Flavor Flav, Keith Sweat, Marcella Lowery, Kelly Jo Minter, Tina Lifford, Erik Kilpatrick, Guy, Troop, LeVert, Akosua Busia, Vin Diesel, Toni Ann Johnson, Jake LaMotta, Vincent Pastore	
M A R C H	15	Class Action	20th Century Fox	Michael Apted (director); Carolyn Shelby, Christopher Ames, Samantha Shad (screenplay); Gene Hackman, Mary Elizabeth Mastrantonio, Colin Friels, Joanna Merlin, Larry Fishburne, Donald Moffat, Jan Rubeš, Matt Clark, Fred Dalton Thompson, Jonathan Silverman, Joan McMurtrey, Anne Ramsay, David Byron, Tim Hopper, Robert David Hall, Wood Moy, Ric Flair	
M A R C H	15	Guilty by Suspicion	Warner Bros. Pictures	Irwin Winkler (director/screenplay); Robert De Niro, Annette Bening, George Wendt, Patricia Wettig, Sam Wanamaker, Luke Edwards, Chris Cooper, Ben Piazza, Martin Scorsese, Barry Primus, Gailard Sartain, Robin Gammell, Brad Sullivan, Tom Sizemore, Roxann Biggs, Stuart Margolin, Barry Tubb, Gene Kirkwood, Margo Winkler, Allan Rich, Illeana Douglas, Al Ruscio, Bill Bailey, Adam Baldwin, Stephen Root, Jon Tenney, Tom Rosqui, Jonathan Ames, Brant von Hoffman, Dianne Reeves, Paul Collins, Kevin Page	
M A R C H	15	If Looks Could Kill	Warner Bros. Pictures	William Dear (director); Darren Star (screenplay); Richard Grieco, Linda Hunt, Roger Rees, Robin Bartlett, Gabrielle Anwar, Geraldine James, Michael Siberry, Tom Rack, Carole Davis, Frederick Coffin, Roger Daltrey, Oliver Dear, Cynthia Preston, Michael Sinelnikoff, Travis Swords, Gerry Mendicino, Fiona Reid, Michael Vinokur, David McIlwraith, Gene Mack, Jacques Tourangeau	
M A R C H	15	The Perfect Weapon	Paramount Pictures	Mark DiSalle (director); David C. Wilson (screenplay); Jeff Speakman, John Dye, Mako, James Hong, Mariska Hargitay, Dante Basco, Professor Toru Tanaka, Seth Sakai, Beau Starr, Clyde Kusatsu, Cary-Hiroyuki Tagawa	
M A R C H	15	True Colors	Paramount Pictures	Herbert Ross (director); Kevin Wade (screenplay); James Spader, John Cusack, Imogen Stubbs, Richard Widmark, Mandy Patinkin, Dina Merrill, Paul Guilfoyle, Philip Bosco, Brad Sullivan	
M A R C H	16	The Josephine Baker Story	HBO Pictures / Anglia Television / Sonar Entertainment	Brian Gibson (director); Ron Hutchinson (screenplay); Lynn Whitfield, Rubén Blades, David Dukes, Louis Gossett Jr., Craig T. Nelson, Kene Holliday, Vivian Bonnell, Pierre Magny, Franco Iiriti, George Faison, Robert Lesser, Luis Reyes, Vivienne Eytle, Zoltán Gera, Mayah McCoy, Ainslie Currie	
M A R C H	22	Defending Your Life	Geffen Pictures	Albert Brooks (director/screenplay); Albert Brooks, Meryl Streep, Rip Torn, Lee Grant, Julie Cobb, Gary Beach, Mary Pat Gleason, Maxine Elliott, Michael Durrell, Ernie Brown, George D. Wallace, Lillian Lehman, S. Scott Bullock, Ethan Randall, Ken Thorley, Bob Braun, Joey Miyashima, Susan Walters, Shirley MacLaine, Hal Landon Jr., Noley Thornton, Glen Chin, David Purdham, James Eckhouse, Peter Schuck, Time Winters, Sharlie Stuart, Marilyn Rockafellow, Art Frankel, Carol Bivins, Gary Ballard, Leonard O. Turner	
M A R C H	22	Mister Johnson	20th Century Fox	Bruce Beresford (director); William Boyd (screenplay); Pierce Brosnan, Edward Woodward, Maynard Eziashi, Beatie Edney, Denis Quilley, Nick Eiding, Bella Enahoro, Hubert Ogunde, Femi Fatoba, Kwabena Manso, Sola Adeyemi, Jerry Linus, George Menta	
M A R C H	22	Teenage Mutant Ninja Turtles II: The Secret of the Ooze	New Line Cinema	Michael Pressman (director); Todd W. Langen (screenplay); Paige Turco, David Warner, Ernie Reyes Jr., François Chau, Kevin Nash, Toshishiro Obata, Raymond Serra, Mark Doerr, Brian Tochi, Robbie Rist, Adam Carl, Laurie Faso, Kevin Clash, David McCharen, Michael McConnohie, Frank Welker, Mak Wilson, Michelan Sisti, Leif Tilden, Kenn Troum, Michael Pressman, Vanilla Ice, Michael Jai White, Steven Ho, Ho-Sung Pak, Rick Lyon, Mark Ginther, Kurt Bryant	
M A R C H	29	Career Opportunities	Universal Pictures / Hughes Entertainment	Bryan Gordon (director); John Hughes (screenplay); Frank Whaley, Jennifer Connelly, Dermot Mulroney, Kieran Mulroney, John M. Jackson, Jenny O'Hara, Noble Willingham, Barry Corbin, Wilbur Fitzgerald, William Forsythe, John Candy	
M A R C H	29	The Comfort of Strangers	Skouras Pictures	Paul Schrader (director); Harold Pinter (screenplay); Christopher Walken, Natasha Richardson, Rupert Everett, Helen Mirren	
M A R C H	29	The Five Heartbeats	20th Century Fox	Robert Townsend (director/screenplay); Keenen Ivory Wayans (screenplay); Robert Townsend, Michael Wright, Leon Robinson, Harry J. Lennix, Tico Wells, Harold Nicholas, Diahann Carroll, Hawthorne James, Chuck Patterson, John Canada Terrell, Roy Fegan, Troy Beyer, Theresa Randle, Lamont Johnson, Carla Brothers, Tressa Thomas	

== April–June ==
Opening		Title	Production company	Cast and crew	Ref.
A P R I L	5	Hangin' with the Homeboys	New Line Cinema	Joseph Vásquez (director/screenplay); Mario Joyner, Doug E. Doug, John Leguizamo, Nestor Serrano	
A P R I L	5	The Marrying Man	Hollywood Pictures	Jerry Rees (director); Neil Simon (screenplay); Alec Baldwin, Kim Basinger, Robert Loggia, Elisabeth Shue, Paul Reiser, Fisher Stevens, Peter Dobson, Armand Assante, Steve Hytner, Kristen Cloke, Kathryn Layng, Jeremy Roberts, Big John Studd	
A P R I L	12	Impromptu	Sovereign Pictures	James Lapine (director); Sarah Kernochan (screenplay); Judy Davis, Hugh Grant, Mandy Patinkin, Bernadette Peters, Julian Sands, Ralph Brown, Georges Corraface, Anton Rodgers, Emma Thompson, Anna Massey, David Birkin, John Savident, Lucy Speed, Elizabeth Spriggs	
A P R I L	12	Out for Justice	Warner Bros. Pictures	John Flynn (director); David Lee Henry (screenplay); Steven Seagal, William Forsythe, Jerry Orbach, Jo Champa, Shareen Mitchell, Sal Richards, Gina Gershon, Jay Acovone, Nick Corello, Robert LaSardo, John Toles-Bey, Joe Spataro, Ed Deacy, Ronald Maccone, Anthony DeSando, Dominic Chianese, Vera Lockwood, Julianna Margulies, Dan Inosanto, John Leguizamo, Jorge Gil, Shannon Whirry	
A P R I L	12	The Object of Beauty	Avenue Pictures	Michael Lindsay-Hogg (director / screenplay); John Malkovich, Andie MacDowell, Joss Ackland, Rudi Davies, Lolita Davidovich	
A P R I L	19	Drop Dead Fred	New Line Cinema	Ate de Jong (director); Carlos Davis, Anthony Fingleton (screenplay); Phoebe Cates, Rik Mayall, Marsha Mason, Tim Matheson, Carrie Fisher, Daniel Gerroll, Ron Eldard, Ashley Peldon, Keith Charles, Bridget Fonda, Eleanor Mondale, Bob Reid	
A P R I L	19	Mortal Thoughts	Columbia Pictures / New Visions Entertainment	Alan Rudolph (director); William Reilly, Claude Kerven (screenplay); Demi Moore, Glenne Headly, Bruce Willis, John Pankow, Harvey Keitel, Billie Neal, Frank Vincent, Doris McCarthy, Karen Shallo	
A P R I L	20	One Man's War	HBO Showcase	Sérgio Toledo (director/screenplay); Michael Carter (screenplay); Anthony Hopkins, Norma Aleandro, Fernanda Torres, Leonardo García Vale, Miah Michelle, Ana Ofelia Murguía, José Antonio Estrada, Rubén Blades, Sergio Bustamante, René Pereyra, Claudia Guzmán, Rufino Echegoyen, Salvador Sánchez, Malena Doria, Gerardo Quiroz, Farnesio de Bernal, Honorato Magaloni, Guillermo Ríos, Claudio Brook, Justo Martínez, Jon Kean	
A P R I L	20	Paris Trout	Showtime / Konigsberg/Sanitsky Productions / Viacom Pictures	Stephen Gyllenhaal (director); Pete Dexter (screenplay); Dennis Hopper, Barbara Hershey, Ed Harris, Ray McKinnon, Tina Lifford, RonReaco Lee, Gary Bullock, Jim Peck, Dan Biggers, Darnita Henry, Eric Ware, Sharlene Ross, Ernest Dixon, Wallace Wilkinson, Ron Leggett	
A P R I L	25	The Punisher	Live Entertainment / New World Pictures	Mark Goldblatt (director); Boaz Yakin (screenplay); Dolph Lundgren, Louis Gossett Jr., Jeroen Krabbé, Kim Miyori, Bryan Marshall, Nancy Everhard, Barry Otto, Brian Rooney, Larry McCormick, Todd Boyce, Lani John Tupu, Brooke Anderson, Char Fontane, Donal Gibson	
A P R I L	26	A Kiss Before Dying	Universal Pictures	James Dearden (director/screenplay); Matt Dillon, Sean Young, Max von Sydow, Diane Ladd, James Russo, Ben Browder, Martha Gehman, Jim Fyfe, Lachele Carl, Shane Rimmer, Adam Horovitz	
A P R I L	26	Oscar	Touchstone Pictures	John Landis (director); Michael Barrie, Jim Mulholland (screenplay); Sylvester Stallone, Marisa Tomei, Ornella Muti, Don Ameche, Peter Riegert, Tim Curry, Vincent Spano, Eddie Bracken, Linda Gray, Chazz Palminteri, Kurtwood Smith, Art LaFleur, Robert Lesser, Yvonne De Carlo, Martin Ferrero, Harry Shearer, Richard Romanus, Arleen Sorkin, Joey Travolta, Jim Mulholland, Kirk Douglas, Elizabeth Barondes, Joycelyn O'Brien	
A P R I L	26	Spartacus (restored version) (re-release)	Universal Pictures	Stanley Kubrick (director); Dalton Trumbo (screenplay); Kirk Douglas, Laurence Olivier, Jean Simmons, Charles Laughton, Peter Ustinov, John Gavin, Tony Curtis, John Dall, Nina Foch, John Ireland, Herbert Lom, Charles McGraw, Joanna Barnes, Harold J. Stone, Woody Strode, Peter Brocco, Paul Lambert, Robert J. Wilke, Nick Dennis, John Hoyt, Frederick Worlock, Gil Perkins, Cliff Lyons	
A P R I L	26	Talent for the Game	Paramount Pictures	Robert M. Young (director); David Himmelstein, Thomas Michael Donnelly, Larry Ferguson (screenplay); Edward James Olmos, Lorraine Bracco, Jamey Sheridan, Terry Kinney, Felton Perry, Tom Bower, Janet Carroll, Dennis Boutsikaris, Leslie Bevis	
A P R I L	26	Toy Soldiers	Tri-Star Pictures	Daniel Petrie Jr. (director); David Koepp, Daniel Petrie Jr. (screenplay); Sean Astin, Wil Wheaton, Keith Coogan, Andrew Divoff, Mason Adams, Denholm Elliott, Louis Gossett Jr., Jerry Orbach, George Perez, T. E. Russell, Shawn Phelan, Knowl Johnson, Michael Champion, R. Lee Ermey, Stan Kelly	
M A Y	1	Citizen Kane (re-release)	Warner Bros. Pictures / RKO Radio Pictures	Orson Welles (director/screenplay); Herman J. Mankiewicz (screenplay); Orson Welles, Joseph Cotten, Dorothy Comingore, Everett Sloane, Ray Collins, George Coulouris, Agnes Moorehead, Paul Stewart, Ruth Warrick, Erskine Sanford, William Alland, Fortunio Bonanova, Gus Schilling, Philip Van Zandt, Georgia Backus, Harry Shannon, Sonny Bupp, Buddy Swan, Charles Bennett, Gregg Toland, Alan Ladd	
M A Y	3	One Good Cop	Hollywood Pictures	Heywood Gould (director/screenplay); Michael Keaton, Rene Russo, Anthony LaPaglia, Benjamin Bratt, Rachel Ticotin, Kevin Conway, Tony Plana, Charlayne Woodard, Kevin Corrigan, Vondie Curtis-Hall, Lisa Arrindell, Rick Aiello, Michael G. Hagerty, J.E. Freeman, Thomas A. Carlin, Brigitte Bako, Penny Santon, Alicia Brandt, George Cheung, Frank Ferrara, Thomas Rosales Jr., Tierre Turner, Robby Robinson, Henry Kingi Jr., Grace Johnston, Rhea Silver-Smith, Blair Swanson, Victor Rivers, David Barry Gray, Tommy Kramer, Danny Kramer, Doug Barron, Vivien Straus, Andre Benita, Kristina Loggia	
M A Y	3	A Rage in Harlem	Miramax Films	Bill Duke (director); Bobby Crawford (screenplay); Forest Whitaker, Gregory Hines, Robin Givens, Zakes Mokae, Danny Glover, Badja Djola, John Toles-Bey, Tyler Collins, Ron Taylor, Samm-Art Williams, Stack Pierce, Willard E. Pugh, Helen Martin, Wendell Pierce, T.K. Carter, Leonard Jackson, Reynaldo Rey, Beatrice Winde, Arthur Burghardt, Jalacy Hawkins, Kiki Shepard, George Wallace, Michael Newman	
M A Y	3	Truly, Madly, Deeply	The Samuel Goldwyn Company	Anthony Minghella (director/screenplay); Juliet Stevenson, Alan Rickman, Bill Paterson, David Ryall, Deborah Findlay, Michael Maloney	
M A Y	10	F/X2	Orion Pictures	Richard Franklin (director); Bill Condon (screenplay); Bryan Brown, Brian Dennehy, Rachel Ticotin, Joanna Gleason, Philip Bosco, Kevin J. O'Connor, Tom Mason, Dominic Zamprogna, Josie de Guzman, John Walsh, Peter Boretski, Lisa Fallon, Lee Broker, Philip Akin, Tony De Santis, James Stacy	
M A Y	10	Madonna: Truth or Dare	Miramax Films	Alek Keshishian (director); Madonna, Warren Beatty, Sandra Bernhard, Antonio Banderas, Pedro Almodóvar, Donna De Lory, Luis Camacho, Kevin Stea, Carlton Wilborn, Manuel Bandera, Christopher Ciccone, Kevin Costner, Adam Curry, Freddy DeMann, Rossy de Palma, Matt Dillon, Jean-Paul Gaultier, Jack Larson, Loles León, Coati Mundi, Olivia Newton-John, Al Pacino, Vincent Paterson, Mandy Patinkin, Lionel Richie, Alan Wilder	
M A Y	10	Sweet Talker	New Line Cinema	Michael Jenkins (director); Tony Morphett (screenplay); Bryan Brown, Karen Allen, Chris Haywood, Bill Kerr, Bruce Spence, Bruce Myles, Paul Chubb, Peter Hehir, Justin Rosniak	
M A Y	10	Switch	HBO / Warner Bros. Pictures	Blake Edwards (director/screenplay); Ellen Barkin, Jimmy Smits, JoBeth Williams, Lorraine Bracco, Tony Roberts, Perry King, Bruce Martyn Payne, Lysette Anthony, Victoria Mahoney, Basil Hoffman, Catherine Keener, Kevin Kilner, David Wohl, James Harper, John Lafayette, Téa Leoni	
M A Y	11	Fever	HBO Pictures	Larry Elikann (director); Larry Brothers (screenplay); Armand Assante, Sam Neill, Marcia Gay Harden, Joe Spano, Gregg Henry, Vic Polizos, Tim Ransom, Jonathan Gries, Mark Boone Junior, Gordon Clapp, John Dennis Johnston, Steve Rankin, Jim Pirri, Francesca Buller, John Capodice, Rainbow Harvest, Dendrie Taylor, JD Cullum, Ron Taylor, Nada Despotovich, Raquel Gardner, Allan Graf, Teresa Gilmore, Joe Zimmerman	
M A Y	17	What About Bob?	Touchstone Pictures	Frank Oz (director); Tom Schulman (screenplay); Bill Murray, Richard Dreyfuss, Julie Hagerty, Charlie Korsmo, Kathryn Erbe, Tom Aldredge, Susan Willis, Roger Bowen, Fran Brill, Doris Belack, Melinda Mullins, Marcella Lowery, Aida Turturro, Lori Tan Chinn, Reg E. Cathey, Tom Stechschulte, Richard Fancy, Joan Lunden, Brian Reddy	
M A Y	17	Mannequin Two: On the Move	20th Century Fox / Gladden Entertainment	Stewart Raffill (director); Edward Rugoff, Michael Gottlieb, David Isaacs, Ken Levine, Betsy Israel (screenplay); Kristy Swanson, William Ragsdale, Meshach Taylor, Terry Kiser, Stuart Pankin, Cynthia Harris, Andrew Hill Newman	
M A Y	17	Stone Cold	Columbia Pictures	Craig R. Baxley (director); Walter Doniger (screenplay); Brian Bosworth, Lance Henriksen, William Forsythe, Arabella Holzbog, Sam McMurray, Richard Gant, David Tress, Illana Diamant	
M A Y	24	Backdraft	Universal Pictures / Imagine Entertainment	Ron Howard (director); Gregory Widen (screenplay); Kurt Russell, William Baldwin, Scott Glenn, Jennifer Jason Leigh, Rebecca De Mornay, Donald Sutherland, Robert De Niro, Jason Gedrick, J.T. Walsh, Jack McGee, John Duda, Robert Swan, Clint Howard, Carlos Sanz, Harry Hutchinson, Jane Jenkins, David Crosby, W. Earl Brown, Gregory Widen, Irma P. Hall, Hollis Resnik, Tony Mockus Sr., Cedric Young, Juan Ramírez, Kevin Casey, Mark Wheeler, Richard Lexsee, Beep Iams, Ron West, Tony Mockus Jr.	
M A Y	24	Hudson Hawk	Tri-Star Pictures	Michael Lehmann (director); Steven E. de Souza, Daniel Waters (screenplay); Bruce Willis, Danny Aiello, Andie MacDowell, James Coburn, Richard E. Grant, Sandra Bernhard, Donald Burton, Andrew Bryniarski, David Caruso, Lorraine Toussaint, Don Harvey, Doug Martin, Steven M. Martin, Leonardo Cimino, Frank Stallone, Carmine Zozzara, Enrico Lo Verso, Courtenay Semel, Frank Welker, William Conrad	
M A Y	24	Only the Lonely	20th Century Fox / Hughes Entertainment	Chris Columbus (director/screenplay); John Candy, Maureen O'Hara, Ally Sheedy, Kevin Dunn, Milo O'Shea, Bert Remsen, Anthony Quinn, James Belushi, Macaulay Culkin, Kieran Culkin, Allen Hamilton, John Chandler, James Deuter, John M. Watson Sr., Doyle Devereux, Joe Greco, Marvin J. McIntyre, Teri McEvoy, Bernie Landis, Les Podewell	
M A Y	24	Thelma & Louise	Metro-Goldwyn-Mayer	Ridley Scott (director); Callie Khouri (screenplay); Susan Sarandon, Geena Davis, Harvey Keitel, Michael Madsen, Christopher McDonald, Stephen Tobolowsky, Brad Pitt, Timothy Carhart, Jason Beghe, Lucinda Jenney, Marco St. John	
M A Y	24	Wild Hearts Can't Be Broken	Walt Disney Pictures	Steve Miner (director); Matt Williams, Oley Sassone (screenplay); Gabrielle Anwar, Michael Schoeffling, Cliff Robertson, Dylan Kussman, Kathleen York, Frank Renzulli, Ed Grady	
M A Y	31	Ambition	Miramax Films / Spirit Films	Scott D. Goldstein (director); Lou Diamond Phillips (screenplay); Lou Diamond Phillips, Clancy Brown, Cecilia Peck, Richard Bradford, Willard E. Pugh, Grace Zabriskie, Katherine Armstrong, JD Cullum, Haing S. Ngor	
M A Y	31	Soapdish	Paramount Pictures	Michael Hoffman (director); Robert Harling, Andrew Bergman (screenplay); Sally Field, Kevin Kline, Robert Downey Jr., Cathy Moriarty, Whoopi Goldberg, Elisabeth Shue, Carrie Fisher, Garry Marshall, Teri Hatcher, Kathy Najimy, Paul Johansson, Sheila Kelley, Arne Nannestad, Tim Choate, Costas Mandylor, Marianne Muellerleile, Mary Pat Gleason, Ben Stein, Barry Kivel, Willie Garson, Wai Ching Ho, Phil Leeds, Herta Ware, Leeza Gibbons, John Tesh, Stephen Nichols, Finola Hughes	
J U N E	7	City Slickers	Columbia Pictures / Castle Rock Entertainment	Ron Underwood (director); Lowell Ganz, Babaloo Mandel (screenplay); Billy Crystal, Daniel Stern, Bruno Kirby, Patricia Wettig, Helen Slater, Jack Palance, Noble Willingham, Tracey Walter, Jeffrey Tambor, Josh Mostel, David Paymer, Bill Henderson, Phill Lewis, Kyle Secor, Dean Hallo, Karla Tamburrelli, Yeardley Smith, Robert Costanzo, Walker Brandt, Molly McClure, Jane Alden, Lindsay Crystal, Jake Gyllenhaal, Danielle Harris, Jayne Meadows, Alan Charof	
J U N E	7	Dark Obsession	Circle Films	Nick Broomfield (director/screenplay); Tim Rose Price (screenplay); Gabriel Byrne, Amanda Donohoe, Michael Hordern, Judy Parfitt, Struan Rodger, Douglas Hodge, Ralph Brown, Ian Carmichael, Matthew Marsh, Sadie Frost, Edward Burnham, Jay Benedict, Peter Sands, David Delve, Alexander Clempson, Catherine Livesey, Phyllida Hewat, Patrick Field, Eiji Kusuhara, Robin Summers, William Hoyland	
J U N E	7	Don't Tell Mom the Babysitter's Dead	Warner Bros. Pictures	Stephen Herek (director); Neil Landau, Tara Ison (screenplay); Christina Applegate, Joanna Cassidy, John Getz, Keith Coogan, Josh Charles, Concetta Tomei, David Duchovny, Kimmy Robertson, Jayne Brook, Eda Reiss Merin, Robert Hy Gorman, Danielle Harris, Christopher Pettiet, Jeff Bollow, Michael Kopelow, Dan Castellaneta	
J U N E	7	Jungle Fever	Universal Pictures / 40 Acres and a Mule Filmworks	Spike Lee (director/screenplay); Wesley Snipes, Annabella Sciorra, Spike Lee, Ossie Davis, Ruby Dee, Samuel L. Jackson, Lonette McKee, John Turturro, Frank Vincent, Anthony Quinn, Halle Berry, Tyra Ferrell, Veronica Webb, David Dundara, Michael Imperioli, Nicholas Turturro, Michael Badalucco, Debi Mazar, Gina Mastrogiacomo, Tim Robbins, Brad Dourif, Phyllis Yvonne Stickney, Theresa Randle, Pamala Tyson, Rick Aiello, Miguel Sandoval, Charlie Murphy, Doug E. Doug, Queen Latifah, Giancarlo Esposito	
J U N E	13	Straight Out of Brooklyn	The Samuel Goldwyn Company	Matty Rich (director/screenplay); Larry Gilliard Jr., George T. Odom, Matty Rich, Mark Malone, Ann D. Sanders, Barbara Sanon, Reana E. Drummond, Ali Shahid Abdul Wahhab	
J U N E	14	Bright Angel	Hemdale Film Corporation	Michael Fields (director); Richard Ford (screenplay); Dermot Mulroney, Lili Taylor, Valerie Perrine, Bill Pullman, Mary Kay Place, Burt Young, Sam Shepard, Benjamin Bratt, Delroy Lindo, Kevin Tighe, Sheila McCarthy, Will Patton	
J U N E	14	Robin Hood: Prince of Thieves	Warner Bros. Pictures / Morgan Creek Productions	Kevin Reynolds (director); Pen Densham, John Watson (screenplay); Kevin Costner, Morgan Freeman, Christian Slater, Alan Rickman, Mary Elizabeth Mastrantonio, Geraldine McEwan, Michael McShane, Brian Blessed, Michael Wincott, Nick Brimble, Harold Innocent, Walter Sparrow, Daniel Newman, Daniel Peacock	
J U N E	16	Without Warning: The James Brady Story	HBO Pictures / Enigma Productions	Michael Toshiyuki Uno (director); Robert Bolt (screenplay); Beau Bridges, Joan Allen, David Strathairn, Bryan Clark, Steven Flynn, Gary Grubbs, Susan Brown, Christine Healy, Timothy Landfield, Alan Ackles, Jack Adams, Tyrees Allen, Rosemary Baxter, Gerry Becker, James Belcher, Rutherford Cravens, Eric Glenn, Nik Hagler, Melanie Haynes, Gloria Hocking, James Jeter, Kim Kilway, James McQueen, Paul Menzel, Diane Perella, Tonie Perensky, James Prince, Spencer Prokop, Brenda Redmond, Steve Ruge, Robert Strane, Woody Watson, Patti Yasutake, James Brady, Sarah Brady, Ted Kennedy	
J U N E	21	Dying Young	20th Century Fox	Joel Schumacher (director); Marti Leimbach, Richard Friedenberg (screenplay); Julia Roberts, Campbell Scott, Vincent D'Onofrio, Colleen Dewhurst, Ellen Burstyn, David Selby, George Martin, A.J. Johnson	
J U N E	21	The Rocketeer	Walt Disney Pictures	Joe Johnston (director); Danny Bilson, Paul De Meo (screenplay); Billy Campbell, Jennifer Connelly, Alan Arkin, Timothy Dalton, Paul Sorvino, Terry O'Quinn, Ed Lauter, James Handy, Jon Polito, William Sanderson, Margo Martindale, John Lavachielli, Clint Howard, Melora Hardin, Rick Overton, Max Grodénchik, Tiny Ron Taylor, Eddie Jones, America Martin, Michael Milhoan, Pat Crawford Brown	
J U N E	21	Where Angels Fear to Tread	Fine Line Features	Charles Sturridge (director/screenplay); Tim Sullivan, Derek Granger (screenplay); Rupert Graves, Helena Bonham Carter, Judy Davis, Helen Mirren, Barbara Jefford	
J U N E	28	The Naked Gun 2½: The Smell of Fear	Paramount Pictures	David Zucker (director/screenplay); Pat Proft (screenplay); Leslie Nielsen, Priscilla Presley, George Kennedy, O. J. Simpson, Robert Goulet, Richard Griffiths, Jacqueline Brookes, Anthony James, Lloyd Bochner, Tim O'Connor, Peter Mark Richman, Ed Williams, Colleen Fitzpatrick, Larry McCormick, Mel Tormé, Zsa Zsa Gabor, "Weird Al" Yankovic, Manny Perry, Raynor Scheine, David Zucker, Robert K. Weiss	

== July–September ==
Opening		Title	Production company	Cast and crew	Ref.
J U L Y	3	Problem Child 2	Universal Pictures / Imagine Entertainment	Brian Levant (director); Scott Alexander, Larry Karaszewski (screenplay); John Ritter, Michael Oliver, Jack Warden, Laraine Newman, Amy Yasbeck, Ivyann Schwan, Gilbert Gottfried, Paul Willson, Bob Smith, Alan Blumenfeld, Krystle Mataras, Tiffany Mataras, Charlene Tilton, Kristina Simonds, Eric Edwards, Aaron Vaughn, James Tolkan, Martha Quinn, Zach Grenier, June Foray	
J U L Y	3	Terminator 2: Judgment Day	Tri-Star Pictures / Carolco Pictures	James Cameron (director/screenplay); William Wisher Jr. (screenplay); Arnold Schwarzenegger, Linda Hamilton, Robert Patrick, Edward Furlong, Earl Boen, Joe Morton, S. Epatha Merkerson, Castulo Guerra, Danny Cooksey, Jenette Goldstein, Xander Berkeley, Leslie Hamilton Gearren, Pete Schrum, Michael Edwards, Don Lake, Nikki Cox, DeVaughn Nixon, Ron Young, Mike Muscat, Dean Norris, Mark Christopher Lawrence, Sven-Ole Thorsen, William Wisher, Don Stanton, Dan Stanton, Abdul Salaam El Razzac, Ken Gibbel, Robert Winley, Charles Robert Brown	
J U L Y	5	Slacker	Orion Classics	Richard Linklater (director/screenplay); Richard Linklater, Teresa Taylor, Abra Moore, Louis Black, Lee Daniel, Louis Mackey, Kim Krizan, Athina Rachel Tsangari, Kalman Spelletich, Rudy Basquez, Mark James, Bob Boyd, Terrence Kirk, Stella Weir, Mark Harris, Frank Orrall, Sarah Harmon, John Slate, Charles Gunning, Scott Rhodes	
J U L Y	12	101 Dalmatians (re-release)	Walt Disney Pictures	Wolfgang Reitherman, Hamilton Luske, Clyde Geronimi (directors); Bill Peet (screenplay); Rod Taylor, Cate Bauer, Betty Lou Gerson, Ben Wright, Bill Lee, Lisa Davis, Martha Wentworth, Frederick Worlock, J. Pat O'Malley, Thurl Ravenscroft, David Frankham, Mimi Gibson, Barbara Beaird, Mickey Maga, Sandra Abbott, Mary Wickes, Tudor Owen, George Pelling, Queenie Leonard, Marjorie Bennett, Barbara Luddy, Rickie Sorensen, Tom Conway, Ramsay Hill, Paul Wexler, Basil Ruysdael, Paul Frees, Lucille Bliss, Junius Matthews	
J U L Y	12	Boyz n the Hood	Columbia Pictures	John Singleton (director/screenplay); Ice Cube, Cuba Gooding Jr., Morris Chestnut, Laurence Fishburne, Angela Bassett, Nia Long, Tyra Ferrell, Redge Green, Dedrick D. Gobert, Baldwin C. Sykes, Tracey Lewis-Sinclair, Alysia Rogers, Regina King, Lexie Bigham, Raymond Turner, Lloyd Avery II, Jessie Lawrence Ferguson	
J U L Y	12	Point Break	20th Century Fox / Largo Entertainment	Kathryn Bigelow (director); W. Peter Iliff (screenplay); Patrick Swayze, Keanu Reeves, Gary Busey, Lori Petty, John C. McGinley, James LeGros, John Philbin, Lee Tergesen, Bojesse Christopher, Vincent Klyn, Chris Pedersen, Anthony Kiedis, Christopher Pettiet, Sydney Walsh, Peter Phelps	
J U L Y	12	Regarding Henry	Paramount Pictures	Mike Nichols (director); J. J. Abrams (screenplay); Harrison Ford, Annette Bening, Bill Nunn, Rebecca Miller, Bruce Altman, Elizabeth Wilson, Donald Moffat, Robin Bartlett, James Rebhorn, Mikki Allen, Peter Appel, Harsh Nayyar, John Leguizamo, Marjorie Monaghan, Emily Wachtel, Jeffrey Abrams, Benjamin Hendrickson, Nancy Marchand, Doris McCarthy	
J U L Y	19	Bill & Ted's Bogus Journey	Orion Pictures / Nelson Entertainment	Pete Hewitt (director); Chris Matheson, Ed Solomon (screenplay); Keanu Reeves, Alex Winter, William Sadler, Joss Ackland, George Carlin, Chelcie Ross, Pam Grier, Annette Azcuy, Sarah Trigger, Hal Landon Jr., Amy Stock-Poynton, Ed Gale, Arturo Gil, Tom Allard, Michael "Boogaloo Shrimp" Chambers, Bruno "Taco" Falcon, Frank Welker, Primus	
J U L Y	19	Dutch	20th Century Fox / Hughes Entertainment	Peter Faiman (director); John Hughes (screenplay); Ed O'Neill, Ethan Embry, JoBeth Williams, Christopher McDonald, Ari Meyers, E.G. Daily, L. Scott Caldwell, Kathleen Freeman, Will Estes, Patrika Darbo, Mickey Jones, J.C. MacKenzie, Ann Hearn, Jack Murdock, Diana Chesney	
J U L Y	20	Doublecrossed	HBO Pictures	Roger Young (director/screenplay); Dennis Hopper, Robert Carradine, Richard Jenkins, Adrienne Barbeau, Don Hood, G.W. Bailey, Danny Trejo, Salvador Levy, Danny Kamin, John McConnell, Eliott Keener, Ed Amatrudo, Jerry Leggio, Brooks Read, Kevin Quigley, John Wilmot, Richard Folmer, Edward Edwards, Thomas Uskali, James Borders, Luigi Rivera, William Agosto, Casey Sander, Jim Gleason, David Dahlgren, Dennis Platt	
J U L Y	24	The Doctor	Touchstone Pictures	Randa Haines (director); Robert Caswell (screenplay); William Hurt, Christine Lahti, Elizabeth Perkins, Mandy Patinkin, Adam Arkin, Charlie Korsmo, Wendy Crewson, Bill Macy, J.E. Freeman, Kyle Secor, Ping Wu, Tony Fields, Brian Markinson, Ken Lerner, Bruce Jarchow, Richard McKenzie, Nancy Parsons, John Marshall Jones, Adam Wylie, Renée Victor, Fran Bennett, Lillian Hurst, Jeris Lee Poindexter, Lily Mariye, Zakes Mokae	
J U L Y	26	Another You	Tri-Star Pictures	Maurice Phillips (director); Ziggy Steinberg (screenplay); Gene Wilder, Richard Pryor, Mercedes Ruehl, Stephen Lang, Vanessa Williams, Vincent Schiavelli, Craig Richard Nelson, Kevin Pollak	
J U L Y	26	Life Stinks	Metro-Goldwyn-Mayer	Mel Brooks (director/screenplay); Ron Clark, Rudy De Luca, Steve Haberman (screenplay); Mel Brooks, Lesley Ann Warren, Jeffrey Tambor, Stuart Pankin, Howard Morris, Rudy De Luca, Theodore Wilson, Michael Ensign, Matthew Faison, Billy Barty, Brian Thompson, Raymond O'Connor, Carmine Caridi, Sammy Shore, Robert Ridgely, John Welsh, Stanley Brock, Michael Pniewski, Marianne Muellerleile, Danny Wells, Larry Cedar, Paul Brinegar, Ralph Ahn, Stu Gilliam, Ralph Mauro, Danny Dayton, Christopher Weeks, S. Scott Bullock, Carmen Filpi, Ronny Graham, Jennifer Warren	
J U L Y	26	Mobsters	Universal Pictures	Michael Karbelnikoff (director); Michael Mahern, Nicholas Kazan (screenplay); Christian Slater, Patrick Dempsey, Richard Grieco, Costas Mandylor, F. Murray Abraham, Lara Flynn Boyle, Michael Gambon, Anthony Quinn, Chris Penn, Nicholas Sadler, Andy Romano, Robert Z'Dar, Frank Collison, Rodney Eastman, Joe Viterelli, Titus Welliver, Leslie Bega, Seymour Cassel, Leonard Termo, Fyvush Finkel, Russell Curry, Carmen Twillie, Don Brockett, Anna Berger, Sharmagne Leland-St. John, Ava Fabian, Willie Garson, Nick Dimitri	
J U L Y	26	V.I. Warshawski	Hollywood Pictures	Jeff Kanew (director); Edward Taylor, David Aaron Cohen, Nick Thiel (screenplay); Kathleen Turner, Jay O. Sanders, Charles Durning, Angela Goethals, Frederick Coffin, Charles McCaughan, Stephen Meadows, Wayne Knight, Lynnie Godfrey, Anne Pitoniak, Stephen Root, Robert Clotworthy, Michael G. Hagerty, Lee Arenberg, John Beasley, Gary Epper, John Fujioka, Nancy Paul, Tom Allard, Everett Smith, Herb Muller, Geof Prysirr, Gene Hartline	
J U L Y	27	A Brighter Summer Day	Cine Qua Non Films	Edward Yang (director/screenplay); Hung Hung, Lai Mingtang, Alex Yang (screenplay); Chang Chen, Lisa Yang, Chang Kuo-Chu, Elaine Jin	
J U L Y	31	Fast Getaway	New Line Cinema / CineTel Films	Spiro Razatos (director); James Dixon (screenplay); Corey Haim, Cynthia Rothrock, Leo Rossi, Ken Lerner, Marcia Strassman, Bernie Pock, Shelli Lether, Tabitha Thompson, Jack North, Kim Peach, Jeff Olson, Richard Jewkes, Corky Edgar, Kelly Ausland, Patrick Redford	
J U L Y	31	Hot Shots!	20th Century Fox	Jim Abrahams (director/screenplay); Pat Proft (screenplay); Charlie Sheen, Cary Elwes, Valeria Golino, Lloyd Bridges, Kevin Dunn, Jon Cryer, William O'Leary, Kristy Swanson, Efrem Zimbalist Jr., Bill Irwin, Heidi Swedberg, Bruce A. Young, Ryan Stiles, Rino Thunder, Mark Arnott, Ryan Cutrona, Don Lake, Kelly Connell, Judith Kahan, Pat Proft, Marc Shaiman, Cylk Cozart, Charles Barkley, Bill Laimbeer, Gene Greytak, Jerry Haleva, Sean Kanan	
A U G U S T	2	Body Parts	Paramount Pictures	Eric Red (director/screenplay); Norman Snider (screenplay); Jeff Fahey, Kim Delaney, Brad Dourif, Zakes Mokae, Lindsay Duncan, Paul Ben-Victor, Peter Murnik, John Walsh, Nathaniel Moreau, Peter MacNeill, Arlene Duncan, Lindsay G. Merrithew, Andy Humphrey, Sarah Campbell, James Kidnie	
A U G U S T	2	Doc Hollywood	Warner Bros. Pictures	Michael Caton-Jones (director); Jeffrey Price, Peter S. Seaman, Daniel Pyne (screenplay); Michael J. Fox, Julie Warner, Woody Harrelson, Bridget Fonda, Barnard Hughes, David Ogden Stiers, Frances Sternhagen, Roberts Blossom, Mel Winkler, George Hamilton, Helen Martin, Macon McCalman, Raye Birk, Amzie Strickland, Jordan Lund, Barry Sobel, Cristi Conaway, Kelly Jo Minter, Michael Caton-Jones, Michael Chapman, Jimmy Star, Eyde Byrde, Tom Lacy, William Cowart, Time Winters, K.T. Vogt	
A U G U S T	2	Paris Is Burning	Off-White Productions / Prestige Pictures / Academy Entertainment	Jennie Livingston (director); Dorian Corey, Pepper LaBeija, Venus Xtravaganza, Octavia St. Laurent, Willi Ninja, Angie Xtravaganza, Freddie Pendavis, Andre Christian, Paris Dupree, Anji Xtravaganza, Danny Xtravaganza, Eileen Ford, Jose Gutierez Xtravaganza, Shari Headley, Geoffrey Holder, Fran Lebowitz, Gwen Verdon, Carmen Xtravaganza, Brooke Xtravaganza, Junior LaBeija, Sandy Ninja, Kim Pendavis, Sol Pendavis, Avis Pendavis, Stevie St. Laurent, Bianca Xtravaganza, David Xtravaganza, David Ian Xtravaganza, David the Father Xtravaganza	
A U G U S T	2	Rover Dangerfield	Warner Bros. Pictures	James L. George, Bob Seeley (director); Rodney Dangerfield (screenplay); Rodney Dangerfield, Ronnie Schell, Ned Luke, Bert Kramer, Robert Pine, Dana Hill, Eddie Barth, Dennis Blair, Don Stewart, Gregg Berger, Paxton Whitehead, Chris Collins, Bernard Erhard, Danny Mann, Robert Bergen, Tress MacNeille, Bill Farmer, Barbara Goodson, Patricia Parris, Ron Taylor, Owen Bush, Mary Kay Bergman, Mel Blanc, Susan Boyd, Shawn Southwick, Sal Landi, Louise Chamis, Lara Cody, Burton Sharp, Ross Taylor, Tom Williams, Ralph Monaco, Michael Sheehan, Kenneth White	
A U G U S T	2	Return to the Blue Lagoon	Columbia Pictures	William A. Graham (director); Leslie Stevens (screenplay); Milla Jovovich, Brian Krause, Lisa Pelikan, Garette Ratliff Henson, Brian Blain, Peter Hehir, Wayne Pygram, John Dicks	
A U G U S T	9	Bingo	Tri-Star Pictures	Matthew Robbins (director); Jim Strain (screenplay); Cindy Williams, David Rasche, Robert J. Steinmiller Jr., David French, Kurt Fuller, Joe Guzaldo, Robert Thurston, Sheelah Megill, Chelan Simmons, Kimberley Warnat, Glenn Shadix, Janet Wright, Wayne Robson, Suzie Plakson, Simon Webb, Tamsin Kelsey, Betty Linde, Blu Mankuma, Jackson Davies, Antony Holland, Gloria Macarenko, Frank Welker	
A U G U S T	9	Delirious	Metro-Goldwyn-Mayer	Tom Mankiewicz (director); Fred Freeman, Lawrence J. Cohen (screenplay); John Candy, Mariel Hemingway, Emma Samms, Raymond Burr, David Rasche, Charles Rocket, Dylan Baker, Jerry Orbach, Renée Taylor, Andrea Thompson, Zach Grenier, Marvin Kaplan, Milt Oberman, Mark Boone Junior, Robert Wagner, Margot Kidder	
A U G U S T	9	Double Impact	Columbia Pictures	Sheldon Lettich (director/screenplay); Jean-Claude Van Damme (screenplay); Jean-Claude Van Damme, Geoffrey Lewis, Alan Scarfe, Philip Chan, Bolo Yeung, Corinna Everson, Alonna Shaw	
A U G U S T	9	Pure Luck	Universal Pictures	Nadia Tass (director); Francis Veber, Herschel Weingrod, Timothy Harris (screenplay); Martin Short, Danny Glover, Sheila Kelly, Sam Wanamaker, Scott Wilson, Harry Shearer	
A U G U S T	14	The Commitments	20th Century Fox / Beacon Pictures	Alan Parker (director); Dick Clement, Ian La Frenais, Roddy Doyle (screenplay); Robert Arkins, Michael Aherne, Angeline Ball, Maria Doyle, Dave Finnegan, Bronagh Gallagher, Félim Gormley, Glen Hansard, Dick Massey, Johnny Murphy, Kenneth McCluskey, Andrew Strong, Colm Meaney, Anne Kent, Andrea Corr, Gerard Cassoni, Ruth and Lindsay Fairclough, Sean Hughes, Maura O'Malley, Jim Corr, Sharon Corr, Caroline Corr, Alan Parker	
A U G U S T	16	Mystery Date	Orion Pictures	Jonathan Wacks (director); Parker Bennett, Terry Runte (screenplay); Ethan Hawke, Teri Polo, Brian McNamara, Fisher Stevens, BD Wong, Tony Rosato, Don S. Davis, James Hong, Victor Wong, Ping Wu, Jerry Wasserman, Terry David Mulligan, Merrilyn Gann, Michele Little, Dave "Squatch" Ward, Peter Williams	
A U G U S T	18	Women & Men 2	HBO Showcase	Walter Bernstein, Mike Figgis, Kristi Zea (directors/screenplay); Carson McCullers, Henry Miller, Irwin Shaw (screenplay); Matt Dillon, Kyra Sedgwick, Ray Liotta, Andie MacDowell, Scott Glenn, Juliette Binoche	
A U G U S T	21	Barton Fink	20th Century Fox	Joel Coen, Ethan Coen (directors/screenplay); John Turturro, John Goodman, Michael Lerner, Judy Davis, John Mahoney, Tony Shalhoub, Jon Polito, Steve Buscemi, David Warrilow, Richard Portnow, Christopher Murney, Meagen Fay, Harry Bugin, Max Grodénchik, Jana Marie Hupp, William H. Macy, Frances McDormand, Barry Sonnenfeld	
A U G U S T	23	Dead Again	Paramount Pictures	Kenneth Branagh (director); Scott Frank (screenplay); Kenneth Branagh, Emma Thompson, Andy García, Derek Jacobi, Wayne Knight, Robin Williams, Hanna Schygulla, Campbell Scott, Jo Anderson, Lois Hall, Richard Easton, Gregor Hesse, Vasek Simek, Christine Ebersole, Raymond Cruz	
A U G U S T	23	Defenseless	New Visions Pictures / Seven Arts	Martin Campbell (director); James Hicks (screenplay); Barbara Hershey, Sam Shepard, Mary Beth Hurt, J.T. Walsh, Kellie Overbey, Jay O. Sanders, John Kapelos, Sheree North, Randy Brooks, George P. Wilbur, Christine Elise, Steve Zettler, Caine Richards, Peter Allas, Sandy Martin	
A U G U S T	23	Harley Davidson and the Marlboro Man	Metro-Goldwyn-Mayer	Simon Wincer (director); Don Michael Paul (screenplay); Mickey Rourke, Don Johnson, Chelsea Field, Daniel Baldwin, Giancarlo Esposito, Vanessa Williams, Tom Sizemore, Robert Ginty, Tia Carrere, Big John Studd, Julius Harris, Eloy Casados, Kelly Hu, Branscombe Richmond, Sven-Ole Thorsen, Sean "Hollywood" Hamilton	
A U G U S T	23	High Heels	El Deseo	Pedro Almodóvar (director/screenplay); Victoria Abril, Marisa Paredes, Miguel Bosé	
A U G U S T	23	Showdown in Little Tokyo	Warner Bros. Pictures	Mark L. Lester (director); Stephen Glantz, Caliope Brattlestreet (screenplay); Dolph Lundgren, Brandon Lee, Cary-Hiroyuki Tagawa, Tia Carrere, Toshirô Obata, Philip Tan, Rodney Kageyama, Ernie Lively, James Taenaka, Renee Griffin, Reid Asato, Takayo Fischer, Simon Rhee, Vernee Watson-Johnson, Professor Toru Tanaka, Lenny Imamura, Roger Yuan, Nathan Jung	
A U G U S T	23	Naked Tango	New Line Cinema	Leonard Schrader (director/screenplay); Vincent D'Onofrio, Mathilda May, Esai Morales	
A U G U S T	29	Hider in the House	Vestron Pictures / Image Entertainment / Live Distributing Inc.	Matthew Patrick (director); Lem Dobbs (screenplay); Gary Busey, Mimi Rogers, Michael McKean, Candace Hutson, Bruce Glover, Leonard Termo, Carole King, Jake Busey, Rebekka Armstrong, Kurt Christopher Kinder, Elizabeth Ruscio, Chuck Lafont, John Green Jr., Bob Neill, Ryan Sheridan	
A U G U S T	30	Beastmaster 2: Through the Portal of Time	New Line Cinema / Republic Pictures	Sylvio Tabet (director/screenplay); Jim Wynorski, R.J. Robertson, Ken Hauser, Doug Miles (screenplay); Marc Singer, Kari Wührer, Sarah Douglas, Wings Hauser, James Avery, Robert Fieldsteel, Arthur Malet, Robert Z'Dar, Michael Berryman, Carl Ciarfalio, Lawrence Dobkin, Wayne Pére, Mark Roberts, Dick Warlock, Frank Welker, Dan Woren, Doug Franklin, Paul Goodman, Gordon Greene	
A U G U S T	30	Child's Play 3	Universal Pictures	Jack Bender (director); Don Mancini (screenplay); Justin Whalin, Perrey Reeves, Travis Fine, Brad Dourif, Peter Haskell, Dakin Matthews, Andrew Robinson, Burke Byrnes, Matthew Walker, Edan Gross, Henry G. Sanders, Lois Foraker, Mark Christopher Lawrence, Catherine Hicks, James Murray, Alex Vincent, Jeremy Sylvers, Dean Jacobsen, Donna Eskra, Ron Fassler, David Ellzey	
S E P T E M B E R	2	The Pope Must Die	Miramax Films	Peter Richardson (director/screenplay); Pete Richens (screenplay); Robbie Coltrane, Beverly D'Angelo, Herbert Lom, Paul Bartel, Salvatore Cascio, Balthazar Getty, Alex Rocco, Adrian Edmondson, Peter Richardson, Annette Crosbie, John Sessions, Khedija Sassi, Mirta Zecevic, Janez Vajevec, Tibor Belicza	
S E P T E M B E R	6	Company Business	Metro-Goldwyn-Mayer	Nicholas Meyer (director/screenplay); Gene Hackman, Mikhail Baryshnikov, Kurtwood Smith, Terry O'Quinn, Daniel von Bargen, Oleg Rudnik, Geraldine Danon, Nadim Sawalha, Michael Tomlinson, Howard McGillin, Louis Eppolito, Shane Rimmer	
S E P T E M B E R	6	Crooked Hearts	Metro-Goldwyn-Mayer	Michael Bortman (director / screenplay); Vincent D'Onofrio, Jennifer Jason Leigh, Peter Berg, Cindy Pickett, Juliette Lewis, Noah Wyle, Peter Coyote, Wendy Gazelle, Marg Helgenberger, Deanna Milligan, Joshua Jackson, Ian Tracey, Vincent Gale, Ryan Jorgensen, Sasha Moisewitsch	
S E P T E M B E R	7	Cast a Deadly Spell	HBO Pictures / Pacific Western	Martin Campbell (director); Joseph Dougherty (screenplay); Fred Ward, Julianne Moore, David Warner, Clancy Brown, Alexandra Powers, Charles Hallahan, Arnetia Walker, Raymond O'Connor, Peter Allas, Lee Tergesen, Ritch Brinkley, Jaime Cardriche, David Downing, Bradley James, Curt Sobel, Ken Thorley, George P. Wilbur, Jenny O'Hara	
S E P T E M B E R	13	Dogfight	Warner Bros. Pictures	Nancy Savoca (director); Bob Comfort (screenplay); River Phoenix, Lili Taylor, E. G. Daily, Richard Panebianco, Anthony Clark, Mitchell Whitfield, Holly Near, Brendan Fraser	
S E P T E M B E R	13	Freddy's Dead: The Final Nightmare	New Line Cinema	Rachel Talalay (director); Michael De Luca (screenplay); Robert Englund, Lisa Zane, Yaphet Kotto, Lezlie Deane, Shon Greenblatt, Breckin Meyer, Ricky Dean Logan, Lindsey Fields, Johnny Depp, Tom Arnold, Roseanne Barr, Alice Cooper, Elinor Donahue	
S E P T E M B E R	13	Liebestraum	Metro-Goldwyn-Mayer	Mike Figgis (director/screenplay); Kevin Anderson, Pamela Gidley, Bill Pullman, Kim Novak, Graham Beckel, Zach Grenier, Thomas Kopache, Jack Wallace, Max Perlich, Catherine Hicks, Roger Howarth, Alicia Roanne Witt, Taina Elg, Hugh Hurd, Karen Sillas	
S E P T E M B E R	18	Mississippi Masala	Metro-Goldwyn-Mayer	Mira Nair (director); Sooni Taraporevala (screenplay); Denzel Washington, Sarita Choudhury, Roshan Seth, Sharmila Tagore, Charles S. Dutton, Joe Seneca, Ranjit Chowdhry, Joseph Olita, Mohan Gokhale, Mohan Agashe, Tico Wells, Yvette Hawkins, Aanjjan Srivastav, Mira Nair	
S E P T E M B E R	18	Paradise	Touchstone Pictures	Mary Agnes Donoghue (director/screenplay); Melanie Griffith, Don Johnson, Elijah Wood, Thora Birch, Sheila McCarthy, Eve Gordon, Louise Latham, Greg Travis	
S E P T E M B E R	20	The Fisher King	Tri-Star Pictures	Terry Gilliam (director); Richard LaGravenese (screenplay); Robin Williams, Jeff Bridges, Mercedes Ruehl, Amanda Plummer, Michael Jeter, David Hyde Pierce, Lara Harris, Harry Shearer, Kathy Najimy, John de Lancie, Tom Waits, Melinda Culea, Ted Ross, Dan Futterman, Bradley Gregg, John Heffernan, Richard LaGravenese, Christian Clemenson, Carlos Carrasco, Patrick Fraley, Craig Castaldo, Jack Mulcahy	
S E P T E M B E R	20	The Indian Runner	Metro-Goldwyn-Mayer	Sean Penn (director/screenplay); David Morse, Viggo Mortensen, Valeria Golino, Patricia Arquette, Jordan Rhodes, Dennis Hopper, Sandy Dennis, Charles Bronson, Benicio del Toro, Harry Crews, Eileen Ryan	
S E P T E M B E R	20	Late for Dinner	Columbia Pictures / Castle Rock Entertainment / New Line Cinema	W.D. Richter (director); Mark Andrus (screenplay); Brian Wimmer, Peter Berg, Marcia Gay Harden, Peter Gallagher, Colleen Flynn, Richard Steinmetz, Ross Malinger, John Prosky, Bo Brundin, Kyle Secor, Billy Vera, Janeane Garofalo, Cassy Friel, Luce Rains, Donald Hotton, Jeremy Roberts	
S E P T E M B E R	20	McBain	Marble Hall / Shapiro-Glickenhaus Entertainment	James Glickenhaus (director/screenplay); Christopher Walken, Michael Ironside, María Conchita Alonso, Steve James, Victor Argo, Thomas G. Waites, Chick Vennera, Jay Patterson, Forrest Compton, Luis Guzmán, Constance Shulman, Karen Duffy, James Glickenhaus, Dick Boccelli, Hechter Ubarry, Russell Dennis Baker	
S E P T E M B E R	20	Rambling Rose	Carolco Pictures	Martha Coolidge (director); Calder Willingham (screenplay); Laura Dern, Robert Duvall, Diane Ladd, Lukas Haas, John Heard, Lisa Jakub, Evan Lockwood, Kevin Conway, Robert John Burke	
S E P T E M B E R	25	Eyes of an Angel	Live Home Video	Robert Harmon (director); Robert Stitzel (screenplay); John Travolta, Ellie Raab, Tito Larriva, Richard Edson, Vincent Guastaferro, Jeffrey DeMunn, Rudd Weatherwax, John Duda	
S E P T E M B E R	27	Deceived	Touchstone Pictures	Damian Harris (director); Mary Agnes Donoghue, Bruce Joel Rubin (screenplay); Goldie Hawn, John Heard, Robin Bartlett, Ashley Peldon, Beatrice Straight, George R. Robertson, Tom Irwin, Jan Rubeš, Anais Granofsky, Heidi Von Palleske, Stanley Anderson, Francesca Butler, Amy Wright, Kate Reid	
S E P T E M B E R	27	Necessary Roughness	Paramount Pictures	Stan Dragoti (director); Rick Natkin, David Fuller (screenplay); Scott Bakula, Héctor Elizondo, Robert Loggia, Harley Jane Kozak, Kathy Ireland, Sinbad, Jason Bateman, Andrew Bryniarski, Duane Davis, Michael Dolan, Marcus Giamatti, Andrew Lauer, Louis Mandylor, Peter "Navy" Tuiasosopo, Larry Miller, Fred Dalton Thompson, Rob Schneider, Garrett Schenck, Rodger Boyce	
S E P T E M B E R	28	Wedlock	HBO Pictures / Spectacor Films	Lewis Teague (director); Broderick Miller (screenplay); Rutger Hauer, Mimi Rogers, Joan Chen, James Remar, Stephen Tobolowsky, Basil Wallace, Grand L. Bush, Denis Forest, Glenn Plummer, Belle Avery, Ismael 'East' Carlo, O-Lan Jones, Tina Lifford, Preston Maybank, Rob Moran, Sherri Paysinger, Albert Stratton, Danny Trejo, Charles Walker, Marcie Jo Warren	

== October–December ==
Opening		Title	Production company	Cast and crew	Ref.
O C T O B E R	4	The Man in the Moon	Metro-Goldwyn-Mayer	Robert Mulligan (director); Jenny Wingfield (screenplay); Reese Witherspoon, Jason London, Sam Waterston, Tess Harper, Gail Strickland, Emily Warfield, Bentley Mitchum, Ernie Lively, Dennis Letts, Earleen Bergeron, Anna Chappell, Brandi and Sandi Smith, Derek and Spencer Ball	
O C T O B E R	4	Ricochet	Warner Bros. Pictures / HBO Pictures / Silver Pictures	Russell Mulcahy (director); Fred Dekker, Menno Meyjes, Steven E. de Souza (screenplay); Denzel Washington, John Lithgow, Ice-T, Kevin Pollak, Lindsay Wagner, Josh Evans, Mary Ellen Trainor, Victoria Dillard, John Amos, John Cothran Jr., Thomas Rosales Jr., Jesse Ventura, Linda Dona	
O C T O B E R	4	Shout	Universal Pictures	Jeffrey Hornaday (director); Joe Gayton (screenplay); John Travolta, James Walters, Heather Graham, Richard Jordan, Linda Fiorentino, Scott Coffey, Glenn Quinn, Sam Hennings, Michael Bacall, Frank von Zerneck, Gwyneth Paltrow, Charles Taylor	
O C T O B E R	4	Suburban Commando	New Line Cinema	Burt Kennedy (director); Frank Cappello (screenplay); Hulk Hogan, Christopher Lloyd, Shelley Duvall, Michael Faustino, Laura Mooney, Larry Miller, Dennis Burkley, Branscombe Richmond, William Ball, Jack Elam, Jo Ann Dearing, Roy Dotrice, Tony Longo, Mark Calaway	
O C T O B E R	4	The Super	20th Century Fox / Largo Entertainment	Rod Daniel (director); Sam Simon (screenplay); Joe Pesci, Vincent Gardenia, Rubén Blades, Madolyn Smith, Stacey Travis, Carole Shelley, Kenny Blank, Steven Rodriguez, Beatrice Winde, Eileen Galindo	
O C T O B E R	9	Homicide	Triumph Films	David Mamet (director/screenplay); Joe Mantegna, William H. Macy, Ving Rhames, Natalia Nogulich, Vincent Guastaferro, J. J. Johnston, Lionel Mark Smith, Rebecca Pidgeon, Roberta Custer, Charles Stransky, Bernard Gray, Paul Butler	
O C T O B E R	11	City of Hope	The Samuel Goldwyn Company	John Sayles (director/screenplay); Vincent Spano, Tony Lo Bianco, Joe Morton, Todd Graff, David Strathairn, Tony Denison, Barbara Williams, Angela Bassett, Gloria Foster, Lawrence Tierney, Stephen Mendillo, Chris Cooper, Jace Alexander, John Sayles, Frankie Faison, Tom Wright, Gina Gershon, Maggie Renzi	
O C T O B E R	11	Ernest Scared Stupid	Touchstone Pictures	John Cherry (director); Coke Sams, Charlie Gale (screenplay); Jim Varney, Eartha Kitt, Austin Nagler, Shay Astar, Alec Klapper, John Cadenhead, Bill Byrge, Richard Woolf, Nick Victory, Jonas Moscartolo, Ernie Fosselius, Daniel Butler, Esther Hudson, Larry Black, Denice Hicks, Jackie Welch, Barkleuy	
O C T O B E R	11	Frankie & Johnny	Paramount Pictures	Garry Marshall (director); Terrence McNally (screenplay); Al Pacino, Michelle Pfeiffer, Héctor Elizondo, Nathan Lane, Kate Nelligan, Jane Morris, Greg Lewis, Al Fann, Ele Keats, Fernando Lopez	
O C T O B E R	11	Shattered	Metro-Goldwyn-Mayer	Wolfgang Petersen (director/screenplay); Tom Berenger, Bob Hoskins, Greta Scacchi, Joanne Whalley, Corbin Bernsen, Scott Getlin, Judi Maddison, Bert Rosario, Jedda Jones, Kellye Nakahara, Dierk Torsek, Theodore Bikel	
O C T O B E R	11	Stepping Out	Paramount Pictures	Lewis Gilbert (director); Richard Harris (screenplay); Liza Minnelli, Shelley Winters, Julie Walters, Robyn Stevan, Bill Irwin, Ellen Greene, Jane Krakowski, Sheila McCarthy, Andrea Martin, Nora Dunn, Eugene Robert Glazer, Carol Woods, Luke Reilly, Geza Kovacs, Raymond Rickman	
O C T O B E R	11	The Taking of Beverly Hills	Columbia Pictures / Nelson Entertainment	Sidney J. Furie (director); Rick Natkin, David Fuller, David J. Burke (screenplay); Ken Wahl, Matt Frewer, Harley Jane Kozak, Robert Davi, Lee Ving, Branscombe Richmond, Lyman Ward, George Wyner, William Prince, Michael Bowen, Tony Ganios, Michael Alldredge, Raymond Singer, Pamela Anderson	
O C T O B E R	18	Cool as Ice	Universal Pictures	David Kellogg (director); David Stenn (screenplay); Vanilla Ice, Kristin Minter, Michael Gross, Deezer D, John Haymes Newton, Candy Clark, Victor DiMattia, Naomi Campbell, Kathryn Morris, Jack McGee, S.A. Griffin, Sydney Lassick, Dody Goodman, Bobbie Brown	
O C T O B E R	18	Little Man Tate	Orion Pictures	Jodie Foster (director); Scott Frank (screenplay); Jodie Foster, Dianne Wiest, Adam Hann-Byrd, Harry Connick Jr., David Hyde Pierce, Debi Mazar, P. J. Ochlan, Michael Shulman, Carolyn Lawrence, Celia Weston, Danitra Vance, Bob Balaban	
O C T O B E R	18	My Own Private Idaho	Fine Line Features	Gus Van Sant (director/screenplay); River Phoenix, Keanu Reeves, James Russo, William Richert, Chiara Caselli, Udo Kier, Rodney Harvey, Grace Zabriskie, Flea, Tom Troupe, Jim Caviezel	
O C T O B E R	18	Other People's Money	Warner Bros. Pictures	Norman Jewison (director); Alvin Sargent (screenplay); Danny DeVito, Gregory Peck, Penelope Ann Miller, Piper Laurie, Dean Jones, R. D. Call, Mo Gaffney, Tom Aldredge	
O C T O B E R	21	Whore	Trimark Pictures	Ken Russell (director/screenplay); Deborah Dalton (screenplay); Theresa Russell, Benjamin Mouton, Antonio Fargas, Jack Nance, John Diehl, Danny Trejo, Ken Russell	
O C T O B E R	23	House Party 2	New Line Cinema	Doug McHenry, George Jackson (directors); Daryl G. Nickens, Rusty Cundieff (screenplay); Christopher "Kid" Reid, Christopher "Play" Martin, Martin Lawrence, Full Force, Tisha Campbell, Kamron, Iman, Queen Latifah, Georg Stanford Brown, Louie Louie, Helen Martin, William Schallert, Tony Burton, Christopher Judge, Whoopi Goldberg	
O C T O B E R	25	The Butcher's Wife	Paramount Pictures	Terry Hughes (director); Ezra Litwak, Marjorie Schwartz (screenplay); Demi Moore, Jeff Daniels, George Dzundza, Frances McDormand, Margaret Colin, Mary Steenburgen, Max Perlich, Miriam Margolyes, Christopher Durang, Luis Ávalos, Helen Hanft, Elizabeth Lawrence, Diane Salinger	
O C T O B E R	25	Curly Sue	Warner Bros. Pictures / Hughes Entertainment	John Hughes (director/screenplay); Jim Belushi, Kelly Lynch, Alisan Porter, John Getz, Fred Dalton Thompson, Branscombe Richmond, Gail Boggs, Viveka Davis, Barbara Tarbuck, John Ashton, Cameron Thor, Edie McClurg, Steve Carell, Burke Byrnes	
O C T O B E R	25	The Hitman	The Cannon Group, Inc.	Aaron Norris (director); Don Carmody, Robert Geoffrion, Galen Thompson (screenplay); Chuck Norris, Michael Parks, Alberta Watson, Al Waxman, Salim Grant, Marcel Sabourin	
O C T O B E R	25	Life Is Sweet	Palace Pictures / Thin Man Films	Mike Leigh (director/screenplay); Alison Steadman, Jim Broadbent, Timothy Spall, Claire Skinner, Jane Horrocks, Stephen Rea, David Thewlis, Moya Brady, David Neilson, Harriet Thorpe, Jack Thorpe Baker	
O C T O B E R	25	Two Evil Eyes	Taurus Entertainment Company	Dario Argento, George A. Romero (directors/screenplay); Franco Ferrini (screenplay); Adrienne Barbeau, E. G. Marshall, Tom Atkins, Harvey Keitel, Madeleine Potter, John Amos, Sally Kirkland, Kim Hunter, Holter Graham, Martin Balsam, Jonathan Adams, Julie Benz, Barbara Bryne, Tom Savini	
N O V E M B E R	1	29th Street	20th Century Fox / Largo Entertainment	George Gallo (director/screenplay); Frank Pesce (screenplay); Danny Aiello, Anthony LaPaglia, Lainie Kazan, Robert Forster, Ron Karabatsos, Frank Pesce, Rick Aiello, Vic Manni, Paul Lazar, Pete Antico, Donna Magnani	
N O V E M B E R	1	Billy Bathgate	Touchstone Pictures	Robert Benton (director); Tom Stoppard (screenplay); Dustin Hoffman, Nicole Kidman, Steven Hill, Loren Dean, Bruce Willis, Stanley Tucci, Mike Starr, Steve Buscemi, Frances Conroy, Moira Kelly, Jack Mulcahy, John Costelloe, Robert F. Colesberry, Kevin Corrigan, Xander Berkeley, Barry McGovern, Paul Herman, Billy Jaye, Timothy Jerome, Stephen Joyce, Terry Loughlin	
N O V E M B E R	1	Highlander II: The Quickening	Entertainment Film Distributors	Russell Mulcahy (director); Peter Bellwood (screenplay); Christopher Lambert, Sean Connery, Virginia Madsen, Michael Ironside, Allan Rich, John C. McGinley, Rusty Schwimmer, Ed Trucco, Steven Grives, Jimmy Murray, Pete Antico, Peter Bucossi	
N O V E M B E R	1	The People Under the Stairs	Universal Pictures	Wes Craven (director/screenplay); Brandon Adams, Everett McGill, Wendy Robie, A. J. Langer, Ving Rhames, Bill Cobbs, Kelly Jo Minter, Sean Whalen, Jeremy Roberts, Conni Marie Brazelton, John Hostetter	
N O V E M B E R	1	Year of the Gun	Triumph Films	John Frankenheimer (director); David Ambrose (screenplay); Andrew McCarthy, Sharon Stone, Valeria Golino, John Pankow, George Murcell, Mattia Sbragia, Roberto Posse, Thomas Elliot, Lou Castel	
N O V E M B E R	2	Prisoner of Honor	HBO Pictures / Warner Bros. Television	Ken Russell (director); Ron Hutchinson (screenplay); Richard Dreyfuss, Oliver Reed, Peter Firth, Jeremy Kemp, Brian Blessed, Peter Vaughan, Kenneth Colley, Catherine Neilson, Lindsay Anderson, Shauna Baird, Duncan Bell, John Bennett, John Cater, Vernon Dobtcheff, Martin Friend, Christopher Logue, Mac McDonald, Michelle McKenna, Murray Melvin, Norman Mitchell, Nick Musker, Anthony Newlands, Carsten Norgaard, Andrew Norman, Judith Paris, Patrick Ryecart, Sean Scanlan, Stephen Simms, Albert Welling, Stephen Houghton, Simon Shelton	
N O V E M B E R	8	All I Want for Christmas	Paramount Pictures	Robert Lieberman (director); Thom Eberhardt, Richard Kramer (screenplay); Thora Birch, Ethan Randall, Harley Jane Kozak, Jamey Sheridan, Lauren Bacall, Leslie Nielsen, Kevin Nealon, Andrea Martin, Amy Oberer, Renée Taylor, Felicity LaFortune, Camille Saviola, Michael Alaimo, Josh Keaton, Elizabeth Cherney	
N O V E M B E R	8	Strictly Business	Warner Bros. Pictures	Kevin Hooks (director); Pam Gibson, Nelson George (screenplay); Tommy Davidson, Joseph C. Phillips, Halle Berry, Anne-Marie Johnson, David Marshall Grant, Jon Cypher, Samuel L. Jackson, Kim Coles, Sam Rockwell, Annie Golden	
N O V E M B E R	13	Cape Fear	Universal Pictures / Amblin Entertainment	Martin Scorsese (director); Wesley Strick (screenplay); Robert De Niro, Nick Nolte, Jessica Lange, Juliette Lewis, Joe Don Baker, Illeana Douglas, Robert Mitchum, Gregory Peck, Fred Dalton Thompson, Martin Balsam, Zully Montero, Domenica Cameron-Scorsese	
N O V E M B E R	15	And You Thought Your Parents Were Weird	Trimark Pictures / Panorama	Tony Cookson (director/screenplay); Marcia Strassman, Joshua John Miller, Edan Gross, John Quade, Sam Behrens, Alan Thicke, Susan Gibney, A.J. Langer, Robert Clotworthy, Armin Shimerman, Gustav Vintas, Eric Walker, Bill Smillie, Allan Wasserman, Susan Brecht	
N O V E M B E R	15	Kafka	Miramax Films	Steven Soderbergh (director); Lem Dobbs (screenplay); Jeremy Irons, Theresa Russell, Joel Grey, Ian Holm, Jeroen Krabbé, Armin Mueller-Stahl, Alec Guinness, Brian Glover, Keith Allen, Simon McBurney, Robert Flemyng, Ion Caramitru, Josef Abrhám, Guy Fithen, Ondřej Havelka, Jerome Flynn, Ewan Stewart, Petr Jákl	
N O V E M B E R	15	Meeting Venus	Warner Bros. Pictures	István Szabó (director/screenplay); Michael Hirst (screenplay); Glenn Close, Niels Arestrup, Marián Labuda, Maïté Nahyr, Victor Poletti, Andre Champeau, Jay O. Sanders, Johanna ter Steege, Maria de Medeiros, Étienne Chicot, Dorottya Udvaros, Macha Méril, Erland Josephson, Roberto Pollak, Francois Delaive, Ildiko Bansagi, Brigitte Sy	
N O V E M B E R	15	Prospero's Books	Miramax Films	Peter Greenaway (director/screenplay); John Gielgud, Michael Clark, Isabelle Pasco, Tom Bell, Kenneth Cranham, Mark Rylance, Jim van der Woude, Gerard Thoolen, Pierre Bokma, Michel Blanc, Erland Josephson, Michiel Romeyn, Paul Russell, James Thiérrée	
N O V E M B E R	22	The Addams Family	Paramount Pictures	Barry Sonnenfeld (director); Caroline Thompson, Larry Wilson (screenplay); Anjelica Huston, Raúl Juliá, Christopher Lloyd, Dan Hedaya, Elizabeth Wilson, Christina Ricci, Paul Benedict, Jimmy Workman, Judith Malina, Carel Struycken, Christopher Hart, Dana Ivey, John Franklin, Mercedes McNab, Sally Jessy Raphael, Tony Azito, Douglas Brian Martin, Steven M. Martin, Allegra Kent, Patty Maloney, Barry Sonnenfeld, Whitby Hertford, Marc Shaiman, S. Scott Bullock, Zelda Rubinstein	
N O V E M B E R	22	An American Tail: Fievel Goes West	Universal Pictures / Amblimation	Phil Nibbelink, Simon Wells (directors); Flint Dille (screenplay); Phillip Glasser, James Stewart, Erica Yohn, Cathy Cavadini, Nehemiah Persoff, Dom DeLuise, Amy Irving, John Cleese, Jon Lovitz, Jack Angel, Vanna Bonta, Philip L. Clarke, Jennifer Darling, Sherry Lynn, Patrick Pinney, Robert Watts, Phil Nibbelink, Simon Wells, Fausto Bara, Annie Holliday, Lev Mailer, Mickie McGowan, Larry Moss, Nigel Pegram, Lisa Raggio, Lawrence Steffan, David Tate	
N O V E M B E R	22	Beauty and the Beast	Walt Disney Pictures	Gary Trousdale, Kirk Wise (directors); Linda Woolverton (screenplay); Paige O'Hara, Robby Benson, Richard White, Jerry Orbach, David Ogden Stiers, Angela Lansbury, Bradley Pierce, Rex Everhart, Jesse Corti, Jo Anne Worley, Hal Smith, Mary Kay Bergman, Brian Cummings, Alvin Epstein, Tony Jay, Kimmy Robertson, Kath Soucie, Frank Welker, Jack Angel, Bruce Adler, Vanna Bonta, Liz Callaway, Philip L. Clarke, Jennifer Darling, George Dvorsky, Bill Farmer, Sherry Lynn, Larry Moss, Caroline Peyton, Patrick Pinney, Phil Proctor, Gordon Stanley, Linda Gary, Joe Ranft, Sheb Wooley, Alec Murphy, Mickie McGowan, Scott Barnes, Maureen Brennan, Margery Daley	
N O V E M B E R	22	The Double Life of Veronique	Miramax Films / Sidéral Productions / Zespól Filmowy "X" / Norsk Film / Canal +	Krzysztof Kieślowski (director/screenplay); Krzysztof Piesiewicz (screenplay); Irène Jacob, Philippe Volter, Sandrine Dumas, Aleksander Bardini, Louis Ducreux, Claude Duneton, Halina Gryglaszewska, Kalina Jędrusik, Guillaume De Tonquédec, Chantal Neuwirth, Władysław Kowalski, Jerzy Gudejko, Janusz Sterninski, Lorraine Evanoff, Gilles Gaston-Dreyfus, Alain Frérot, Youssef Hamid, Thierry de Carbonnières, Nausicaa Rampony, Boguslawa Schubert, Jacques Potin	
N O V E M B E R	22	For the Boys	20th Century Fox	Mark Rydell (director); Marshall Brickman, Neal Jimenez, Lindy Laub (screenplay); Bette Midler, James Caan, Arye Gross, George Segal, Patrick O'Neal, Christopher Rydell, Brandon Call, Norman Fell, Rosemary Murphy, Bud Yorkin, Dori Brenner, Jack Sheldon, Michael Greene, Melissa Manchester, Steven Kampmann	
N O V E M B E R	27	Hearts of Darkness: A Filmmaker's Apocalypse	American Zoetrope / Triton Pictures	Eleanor Coppola (director); Fax Bahr, George Hickenlooper (directors/screenplay); Eleanor Coppola, Francis Ford Coppola, Robert Duvall, Dennis Hopper, George Lucas, John Milius, Martin Sheen	
N O V E M B E R	27	My Girl	Columbia Pictures / Imagine Entertainment	Howard Zieff (director); Laurice Elehwany (screenplay); Dan Aykroyd, Jamie Lee Curtis, Macaulay Culkin, Anna Chlumsky, Griffin Dunne, Richard Masur, Peter Michael Goetz, Ann Nelson	
D E C E M B E R	6	At Play in the Fields of the Lord	Universal Pictures	Héctor Babenco (director); Jean-Claude Carrière, Vincent Patrick (screenplay); Tom Berenger, John Lithgow, Daryl Hannah, Aidan Quinn, Kathy Bates, Tom Waits, Stênio Garcia, Nelson Xavier, José Dumont, Niilo Kivirinta	
D E C E M B E R	6	Star Trek VI: The Undiscovered Country	Paramount Pictures	Nicholas Meyer (director/screenplay); Denny Martin Flinn (screenplay); William Shatner, Leonard Nimoy, DeForest Kelley, James Doohan, George Takei, Walter Koenig, Nichelle Nichols, Kim Cattrall, Christopher Plummer, David Warner, Rosanna DeSoto, Iman, Brock Peters, Kurtwood Smith, René Auberjonois, Michael Dorn, Mark Lenard, Grace Lee Whitney, Leon Russom, John Schuck, Robert Easton, W. Morgan Sheppard, Brett Porter, Christian Slater, Tom Morga, John Bloom, Darryl Henriques	
D E C E M B E R	6	December	IRS Media	Gabe Torres (director/written); Balthazar Getty, Jason London, Brian Krause, Wil Wheaton, Chris Young	
D E C E M B E R	11	Hook	TriStar Pictures / Amblin Entertainment	Steven Spielberg (director); James V. Hart, Malia Scotch Marmo (screenplay); Robin Williams, Dustin Hoffman, Julia Roberts, Bob Hoskins, Maggie Smith, Charlie Korsmo, Caroline Goodall, Dante Basco, Jasen Fisher, Laurel Cronin, Phil Collins, Arthur Malet, James Madio, David Crosby, Jimmy Buffett, Glenn Close, Tony Burton, George Lucas, Carrie Fisher, Amber Scott, Isaiah Robinson, Raushan Hammond, Thomas Tulak, Alex Zuckerman, Ahmad Stoner, Jake Hart	
D E C E M B E R	13	The Last Boy Scout	Geffen Pictures / Silver Pictures	Tony Scott (director); Shane Black (screenplay); Bruce Willis, Damon Wayans, Chelsea Field, Noble Willingham, Taylor Negron, Danielle Harris, Halle Berry, Bruce McGill, Kim Coates, Chelcie Ross, Joe Santos, Clarence Felder, Tony Longo, Frank Collison, Eddie Griffin, Billy Blanks, Rick Ducommun, Badja Djola, Colby Kline, Bill Medley, Verne Lundquist, Dick Butkus, Lynn Swann, Morris Chestnut, Ryan Cutrona, Michael Papajohn, James Keane, Jack Kehler, Manny Perry, James Gandolfini, Anne Lockhart	
D E C E M B E R	20	Bugsy	TriStar Pictures / Mulholland Productions / Baltimore Pictures	Barry Levinson (director); James Toback (screenplay); Warren Beatty, Annette Bening, Harvey Keitel, Ben Kingsley, Elliott Gould, Joe Mantegna, Bebe Neuwirth, Bill Graham, Lewis Van Bergen, Wendy Phillips, Richard C. Sarafian, Carmine Caridi, Andy Romano, Wendie Malick, Kimberly McCullough, Don Calfa, Ray McKinnon, Joseph Roman, James Toback, Robert Glaudini, Eric Christmas, Robert Beltran, Traci Lind, Debrah Farentino, Stefanie Mason, Joe Baker, Ksenia Prohaska, Gian-Carlo Scandiuzzi, Don Carrara, Bryan Smith	
D E C E M B E R	20	Father of the Bride	Touchstone Pictures	Charles Shyer (director); Nancy Meyers, Frances Goodrich, Albert Hackett (screenplay); Steve Martin, Diane Keaton, Kimberly Williams, Martin Short, George Newbern, Kieran Culkin, Peter Michael Goetz, Kate McGregor-Stewart, B.D. Wong, Richard Portnow, David Pasquesi, Chauncey Leopardi, Eugene Levy, Sarah Rose Karr, Ira Heiden, Britt Leach	
D E C E M B E R	20	JFK	Warner Bros. Pictures	Oliver Stone (director/screenplay); Zachary Sklar (screenplay); Kevin Costner, Kevin Bacon, Tommy Lee Jones, Laurie Metcalf, Gary Oldman, Michael Rooker, Jay O. Sanders, Sissy Spacek, Jack Lemmon, Walter Matthau, Donald Sutherland, John Candy, Joe Pesci, Beata Pozniak, Edward Asner, Brian Doyle-Murray, Sally Kirkland, Wayne Knight, Pruitt Taylor Vince, Tony Plana, Vincent D'Onofrio, Dale Dye, Lolita Davidovich, John Larroquette, Willem Oltmans, Tomas Milian, Gary Grubbs, Ron Rifkin, Peter Maloney, John Finnegan, Wayne Tippit, Bob Gunton, Frank Whaley, Jim Garrison, Sean Stone, Gail Cronauer, James N. Harrell, Ellen McElduff, Jo Anderson, Marco Perella, Edwin Neal, Darryl Cox, J.J. Johnston, R. Bruce Elliott, Jerry Douglas, George R. Robertson, Bill Bolender, Hale Boggs, Jeff Bornstein, Willy Brandt, Charles Brehm, Leonid Brezhnev, Charles Cabell, Earle Cabell, Fidel Castro, John Connally, Nellie Connally, Walter Cronkite, Charles de Gaulle, Ngo Dinh Diem, Dwight D. Eisenhower, Ludwig Erhard, Sam Giancana, Roswell Gilpatric, William Greer, Andrei Gromyko, Clint Hill, Jimmy Hoffa, J. Edgar Hoover, Hubert H. Humphrey, Jesse Jackson, Lady Bird Johnson, Lyndon B. Johnson, Roy Kellerman, John Kennedy Jr., Caroline Kennedy, Ethel Kennedy, John F. Kennedy Jr., Joseph P. Kennedy, Robert F. Kennedy, Rose Kennedy, Ted Kennedy, Nikita Khrushchev, Martin Luther King, Peter Lawford, Curtis LeMay, Henry Cabot Lodge Jr., Patrice Lumumba, James MacArthur, Malcolm X, Eugene McCarthy, John J. McCloy, Robert McNamara, Mary Moorman, Mohammed Mossadegh, Pat Nixon, Richard Nixon, Jacqueline Kennedy Onassis, Mohammad Reza Pahlavi, David F. Powers, Francis Gary Powers, Nelson Rockefeller, Roman Rudenko, Richard B. Russell, Haile Selassie, Martin Sheen, David M. Shoup, Adlai Stevenson, Maxwell Taylor, Henry M. Wade, Earl Warren, John B. Wells	
D E C E M B E R	22	Rush	Metro-Goldwyn-Mayer / The Zanuck Company	Lili Fini Zanuck (director); Pete Dexter (screenplay); Jason Patric, Jennifer Jason Leigh, Sam Elliott, Max Perlich, Gregg Allman, Tony Frank, William Sadler, Dennis Letts, Dennis Burkley	
D E C E M B E R	25	Grand Canyon	20th Century Fox	Lawrence Kasdan (director/screenplay); Meg Kasdan (screenplay); Danny Glover, Kevin Kline, Steve Martin, Mary McDonnell, Mary-Louise Parker, Alfre Woodard, Jeremy Sisto, Tina Lifford, Randle Mell	
D E C E M B E R	25	The Prince of Tides	Columbia Pictures	Barbra Streisand (director); Pat Conroy, Becky Johnston (screenplay); Nick Nolte, Barbra Streisand, Blythe Danner, Jason Gould, Melinda Dillon, Kate Nelligan, Jeroen Krabbé, George Carlin, Brad Sullivan	
D E C E M B E R	25	Until the End of the World	Warner Bros. Pictures	Wim Wenders (director/screenplay); Peter Carey (screenplay); William Hurt, Solveig Dommartin, Sam Neill, Max von Sydow, Rüdiger Vogler, Ernie Dingo, Jeanne Moreau, Eddy Mitchell, Adelle Lutz, David Gulpilil, Jimmy Little, Chick Ortega, Elena Smirnova, Chishū Ryū, Allen Garfield, Lois Chiles, Kuniko Miyake	
D E C E M B E R	27	Fried Green Tomatoes	Universal Pictures	Jon Avnet (director); Fannie Flagg, Carol Sobieski (screenplay); Kathy Bates, Jessica Tandy, Mary Stuart Masterson, Mary-Louise Parker, Cicely Tyson, Chris O'Donnell, Stan Shaw, Gailard Sartain, Tim Scott, Gary Basaraba, Lois Smith, Jo Harvey Allen, Macon McCalman, Richard Riehle, Raynor Scheine, Grace Zabriskie, Nick Searcy, Constance Shulman	
D E C E M B E R	27	Hear My Song	Miramax Films	Peter Chelsom (director/screenplay); Adrian Dunbar (screenplay); Adrian Dunbar, Tara Fitzgerald, Ned Beatty, David McCallum, Shirley Anne Field, William Hootkins, James Nesbitt, John Dair, Stephen Marcus, Joe Cuddy, Vernon Midgley	
D E C E M B E R	27	Naked Lunch	20th Century Fox	David Cronenberg (director/screenplay); Peter Weller, Judy Davis, Ian Holm, Roy Scheider, Joseph Scorsiani, Julian Sands, Monique Mercure, Michael Zelniker, Nicholas Campbell, Robert A. Silverman, John Friesen, Sean McCann	

== See also ==
- List of 1991 box office number-one films in the United States
- 1991 in the United States
