= The Man from Saigon =

2009 novel by Marti Leimbach

- First UK edition
- Author: Marti Leimbach
- Language: English
- Genre: Fiction
- Published: 2009
- Media type: Print
- Pages: 342 pages
- ISBN: 9780385529860
- OCLC: 368020800

The Man From Saigon is 2009 novel by Marti Leimbach.

It was published in the United Kingdom by Fourth Estate in 2009 and in the United States by Nan A. Talese/Random House in 2010.

== Plot ==
In 1967, during the Vietnam War, half-American and half-English war correspondent Susan Gifford finds herself falling in love with Marc Davies, her fellow correspondent who was married to another woman, and who made friends with Hoang Van Son, a photographer. The three agree to cover the war before finding themselves hostages of the Vietcong who suspected Son to be a spy. Susan struggles in her relationship with Marc while Son is put at risk.

== Characters ==
- Susan Gifford is a wartime journalist born to a British mother and American father. She has an affair with Marc Davies, a fellow correspondent whom she met her during the Vietnam War, and made friends with Hoang Van Son.
- Hoang Van Son is a Vientnamese photographer hired by American press and a friend of Susan. He is a kind-hearted and calm man.
- Marc Davies is a married correspondent with whom Susan has an affair with while his wife was pregnant. He dislikes Son very much.
- Donna A is a nurse and a hostage of the Vietcong.
- Anh/Long Hair is a Vietcong soldier and leader who kidnaps Susan and Son. He is so nicknamed because he has long hair.
- Hien/Thin One is another Vietcong soldier who tried to kill Susan before Son saved her. He and Minh have a close relationship as brothers.
- Minh/Gap Tooth is another Vietcong soldier who took Marc and Don hostage.
- Don Locke is Marc's friend who is also kidnapped by the Vietcong.
- Jonas is a German driver.
