= Ox-Tales =

Anthology series

- Ox-Tales: Earth; Ox-Tales: Fire; Ox-Tales: Air; Ox-Tales: Water
- Edited by: Peter Florence; Mark Ellingham
- Language: English
- Publisher: Green Profile
- Published: 2 July 2009
- No. of books: 4

Ox-Tales refers to four anthologies of short stories written by 38 of the UK's best-known authors. All donated their stories to Oxfam. The books and stories are loosely based on the four elements: Earth, Fire, Air and Water.

The Ox-Tales books were published in partnership with Green Profile to raise revenue for Oxfam projects tackling poverty around the world. Oxfam receives a percentage of the cover price of each book sold (£3.50 per book if bought directly from an Oxfam shop or Oxfam's website and 50p if the books are purchased through other retailers).

== Themes ==
The themes of the collections are intended to represent four aspects of Oxfam's work:

- Earth — land rights and farming
- Fire — campaigning for arms control
- Air — combating climate change
- Water — safe water and sanitation

Each book contains a poem by Vikram Seth and an afterword written by Oxfam, detailing their work in that area.

== Authors ==
38 British and Irish based authors contributed to this project.

- Earth: Rose Tremain, Jonathan Coe, Marti Leimbach, Kate Atkinson, Ian Rankin, Marina Lewycka, Hanif Kureishi, Jonathan Buckley, Nicholas Shakespeare, Vikram Seth.
- Fire: Mark Haddon, Geoff Dyer, Victoria Hislop, Sebastian Faulks, John le Carré, Xiaolu Guo, William Sutcliffe, Ali Smith, Lionel Shriver, Jeanette Winterson, Vikram Seth.
- Air: Alexander McCall Smith, Helen Simpson, DBC Pierre, A. L. Kennedy, Kamila Shamsie, Beryl Bainbridge, Louise Welsh, Diran Adebayo, Helen Fielding, Vikram Seth.
- Water: Esther Freud, David Park, Hari Kunzru, Zoë Heller, Michel Faber, William Boyd, Giles Foden, Joanna Trollope, Michael Morpurgo, Vikram Seth.

== Publication details ==
Ox-Tales were published by Green Profile (owned by Profile Books) on 2 July 2009. They were originally published to mark the start of Oxfam's first annual book festival, Bookfest (4–18 July 2009).

== Reception ==
In Autumn 2009, the National Association for the Teaching of English (NATE) recommended Ox-Tales to its readers as "enjoyable, thought-provoking reading for you and also for older students — well worth a place in the secondary school stock cupboard for KS4 of KS5."

NATE reprinted Marina Lewycka's story "The Importance of Having Warm Feet" from the Ox-Tales: Earth collection in the October 2009 edition of their magazine, Classroom.
