= JD Cullum =

American actor (born 1966)

- Born: John David Cullum; March 1, 1966 (age 60); New York City, U.S.
- Occupation: Actor
- Years active: 1983–present
- Parent(s): John Cullum; Emily Frankel

John David Cullum (born March 1, 1966) is an American actor who made his film debut in the CBS Afternoon Playhouse Special Revenge of the Nerd in 1983, playing a jock.

== Early life and family ==
Cullum was born in New York City, the son of John Cullum, a noted Broadway actor, and Emily Frankel, a novelist, playwright, choreographer, and dancer. He grew up in Manhattan and currently resides in Los Angeles where he is a longstanding member of the Antaeus Theater Company.

== Filmography ==
=== Television ===
| Year | Title | Role | Notes |
|---|---|---|---|
| 1983 | CBS Afternoon Playhouse | Jock Guy | 1 episode |
| 1985 | Young People's Specials | Digby 'The Hawk' Hummer | 1 episode |
| 1991 | Star Trek: The Next Generation | Toral | 2 episodes |
| 1991 | Pink Lightning | | TV movie |
| 1992 | Mattie's Waltz | Young Clyde | TV movie |
| 1993 | Bodies of Evidence | Travis | 1 episode |
| 1993 | Return to Lonesome Dove | 1st Deputy | TV miniseries |
| 1994 | Lois & Clark: The New Adventures of Superman | Randall Loomis | 1 episode |
| 1995–1996 | Campus Cops | Raskin | 9 episodes |
| 1995 | Married... with Children | Dr Kessler | 1 episode |
| 1995 | Can't Hurry Love | Blake | 1 episode |
| 1997 | Liberty! The American Revolution | Nicholas Cresswell | 4 episodes |
| 1998 | Tracey Takes On... | Usher | 1 episode |
| 1998 | L.A. Doctors | Second Year Resident | 1 episode |
| 1999 | Sliders | Arlo Higgins | 1 episode |
| 1999 | Ladies Man | | 1 episode |
| 2000 | Chicago Hope | Glen Rafkin | 1 episode |
| 2000–2005 | Judging Amy | AAG Redfield | 3 episodes |
| 2001 | NYPD Blue | Jimmy Ceisler | 1 episode |
| 2001 | Dead Last | Ted | 1 episode |
| 2001 | 61* | Gabe Pressman | TV movie; credited as J.D. Cullum |
| 2002 | Frasier | Donald | 1 episode |
| 2004 | 24 | Bruce Margolis | 1 episode |
| 2006 | Charmed | Demon | 1 episode |
| 2007 | ER | Munchausen patient | 1 episode |
| 2008 | Medium | Optometrist | 1 episode |
| 2008 | Weeds | Lawson | 1 episode |
| 2008 | Law & Order | Bob | Episode: "Knock Off" |
| 2008 | Lie to Me | Dr Dembeck | 1 episode |
| 2009 | Wizards of Waverly Place | Alucard Van Heusen | 2 episodes |
| 2010 | Mad Men | George Casey | Episode: "Hands and Knees" |
| 2014 | Bones | Glen Durant | 3 episodes |
| 2016 | Aquarius | H.R. Haldeman | 2 episodes |
| 2024 | Ted | Lloyd | 1 episode |

=== Film ===
| Year | Title | Role | Notes |
|---|---|---|---|
| 1986 | The Manhattan Project | Eccles | Credited as John David Cullum |
| 1986 | Willy/Milly | Tom | Credited as John David Cullum |
| 1987 | Morgan Stewart's Coming Home | Garrett | Credited as John David Cullum |
| 1989 | Glory | Henry Sturgis Russel | Credited as John David Cullum |
| 1990 | Reversal of Fortune | John | Credited as John David Cullum |
| 1991 | Providence | | |
| 1991 | Ambition | Jack | |
| 1991 | Fever | Denny | |
| 1992 | Roadside Prophets | Mr Andrews | Credited as J.D. Cullum |
| 1992 | Forever Young | Frank | Credited as J.D. Cullum |
| 1999 | Making Contact | Lans | |
| 2000 | Shafted! | Laurence St. Lawrence | Credited as John David Cullum |
| 2002 | Luster | Ned Smythe | Credited as J.D. Cullum |
| 2005 | Good Night, and Good Luck | Stage Manager | |
| 2008 | Leatherheads | Leonard | Credited as J.D. Cullum |
| 2013 | The Lone Ranger | Wendell | |
| 2020 | The Man with the Golden Gun: The Radio Play | Nicholson (voice) | Video |

=== Video games ===
| Year | Title | Role | Notes | Source |
|---|---|---|---|---|
| 2002 | Law & Order: Dead on the Money | Lucas Allen | Credited as J.D. Cullum | |
| 2004 | Full Spectrum Warrior | Shedadi, NATO British Officer | Credited as J.D. Cullum | |
| 2007 | Universe at War: Earth Assault | Novus Founder, Novus Science Officer, Male Civilian #1 | | |
| 2009 | Dissidia Final Fantasy | Kuja | | |
| 2011 | Dissidia 012 Final Fantasy | Kuja | | |
| 2011 | L.A. Noire | Ray Pinker | | |
| 2011 | Resistance 3 | Dale, Warden #4 | | |
| 2018 | Dissidia Final Fantasy NT | Kuja | | |
