= Theremin: An Electronic Odyssey =

1993 documentary film

- Directed by: Steven M. Martin
- Written by: Steven M. Martin
- Produced by: Steven M. Martin
- Starring: Léon Theremin; Clara Rockmore; Robert Moog; Lydia Kavina; Nicolas Slonimsky; Brian Wilson; Todd Rundgren
- Cinematography: Frank De Marco; Robert Stone; Cris Lombardi; Ed Lachman
- Edited by: David Greenwald
- Music by: Hal Willner
- Production companies: Kaga Bay; Channel Four Films
- Distributed by: Orion Classics
- Release dates: November 2, 1993 (Channel 4); January 24, 1994 (Sundance)
- Running time: 84 minutes
- Countries: United Kingdom; United States
- Languages: English; Russian
- Box office: $253,311

Theremin: An Electronic Odyssey is a 1993 documentary film directed, written and produced by Steven M. Martin about the life of Léon Theremin and his invention, the theremin, a pioneering electronic musical instrument.

== Synopsis ==
The film follows Theremin's life, including being imprisoned in a Soviet Gulag, and the influence of his instrument, which came to define the sound of eerie in 20th-century films, and influenced popular music as it searched for and celebrated electronic music in the 1960s.

== Release ==
It was first broadcast on November 2, 1993 (coincidentally, one day before Theremin's death) as a special edition of Channel 4's Without Walls arts strand.

== Reception ==
Theremin set a record for the longest question and answer period at the National Gallery in Washington, and was shown by invitation of the Russian Ministry of Culture to top scientists in St. Petersburg.

Janet Maslin of The New York Times called the film a "fascinating, offbeat documentary that stands as a fine job of detective work".

Emanuel Levy wrote in Variety: "Considering the flamboyant life that the handsome Theremin lived, the intellectual circles he belonged to and his invention of the world's first electronic security system (for Sing Sing prison), Theremin: An Electronic Odyssey suffers from too many information gaps and an awkward structure. Despite all the problems, the man that Theremin celebrates lived such an outlandish life that it's always absorbing to watch his near-century-long odyssey. Here is a documentary that should have been longer – and fuller."

In a December 1995 review, Roger Ebert wrote: "Watching Theremin: An Electronic Odyssey is a curious experience. You begin with interest, and then you pass through the stages of curiosity, fascination and disbelief, until in the last 20 minutes, you arrive at a state of dumbfounded wonder. It is the kind of movie that requires a musical score only the Theremin possibly could supply."

== Accolades ==
Theremin: An Electronic Odyssey won the Documentary Filmmakers Trophy at the 1994 Sundance Film Festival. It was nominated for an International Emmy, and the Huw Wheldon Award for the Best Arts Programme at the 1994 British Academy Television Awards.

== Home media ==
Theremin: An Electronic Odyssey was released on DVD by MGM Home Video on April 1, 2003.

== See also ==
- Moog
