= Sweet Nothing (film) =

- Theatrical release poster
- Directed by: Gary Winick
- Written by: Lee Drysdale
- Produced by: Rick Bowman; Gary Winick
- Starring: Michael Imperioli; Mira Sorvino; Paul Calderón
- Cinematography: Makoto Watanabe
- Edited by: Niels Mueller
- Music by: Steven M. Stern
- Distributed by: Warner Bros.
- Release dates: June 8, 1995 (Seattle International Film Festival); September 6, 1996 (United States)
- Running time: 89 minutes
- Country: United States
- Language: English
- Box office: $102,350

Sweet Nothing is a 1995 American drama film directed by Gary Winick and starring Michael Imperioli, Mira Sorvino and Paul Calderón. The film was inspired from real-life diary pages found by the filmmakers in a Bronx apartment.

== Plot ==
After his wife Monika gives birth to his second child, Angelo goes out to celebrate. Angelo's friend Ray offers him his first hit of crack cocaine and he gets hooked on the drug. With the hesitant support of Monika, Angelo decides to deal drugs for a short period to get the family out of debt and afford nice things for them. However, as Angelo's addiction grows, his involvement in dealing increases, with his family taking the toll.

== Cast ==
- Michael Imperioli as Angelo
- Mira Sorvino as Monika
- Paul Calderón as Ray
- Lisa Langford as Edna (as Lisa Langford)
- Patrick Breen as Greg
- Maria Tucci as Monika's Mother
- Christopher Marquette as Richie
  - Sean Marquette as young Richie
- Michele Casey as Annie
- Carlos Yensi as Jose
- Brian Tarantina as Dee Dee
- Jean La Marre as Beany
- Bruce Smolanoff as Mal
- William Rothlein as Rodriguez
- Anibal O. Lleras as Georgy
- Billie Neal as Rio
- George T. Odom as Spanky (as George Odom)
- Richard Bright as Jack the Cop
- Chuck Cooper as Mark the Cop
- Michael Sorvino as Waiting Customer
- John Imperioli as Waiting Customer
- John E. O'Keefe as Howard
- Joyce Phillips as Nurse (voice)

== Reception ==
Though critics were divided by the film's story, with some calling it a "darkly filmed anti-drug public service announcement", the performances of Imperioli and Sorvino were praised. Michael Wilmington of the Chicago Tribune commented Imperioli gives "one of the best balanced, most intelligent pieces of acting in any American film this year."

Roger Ebert gave a positive review and wrote, "In Sweet Nothing [Imperioli] shows a new maturity and command in his acting, maybe because he is given a key role that runs all the way through. He doesn't fall for the actor's temptation of making too many emotional choices; he understands that many of Angel's [sic] problems are very simple: He wants to use more drugs than he can afford. For Mira Sorvino, this is a new kind of role, and she is very good in it, as a woman who wants to hold her marriage and family together, who is willing to give her husband the benefit of the doubt, who believes more than she should, stays longer than she should, and finally finds the strength to act for herself."
