= Willard E. Pugh =

American actor

- Born: Willard Earl Pugh; June 16, 1959 (age 66); Memphis, Tennessee, U.S.
- Occupations: Actor; probation officer
- Years active: 1982–present Graduated from the University of South Dakota with a B.F.A. in Theatre & Drama 1981 Also attended Memphis State University and Webster College Conservatory.

Willard Earl Pugh (born June 16, 1959) is an American actor with numerous film and television credits. He has appeared in notable mainstream Hollywood films such as The Color Purple and Air Force One as well as genre films such as RoboCop 2 and Mil Mascaras vs. the Aztec Mummy. In the latter film his excellence as an ensemble actor was specifically cited by PopMatters film critic Bill Gibron. Pugh was a voice actor for one of the California Raisins, and appeared in an episode of the cult-classic The Super Mario Bros. Super Show!.

Pugh taught broadcasting and film classes at Chaffey College for 11 years in Rancho Cucamonga in the early 1990s.

Pugh was born in Memphis, Tennessee, the son of Pearlie (née Harris) and Henry Minor Pugh and graduated from Hamilton High School.

== Films ==
- 1982: Divided We Fall - Runaway Slave
- 1984: The Hills Have Eyes Part II - Foster
- 1984: Toy Soldiers - Ace
- 1985: Moving Violations - Jeff Roth
- 1985: Stand Alone - Macombers
- 1985: The Color Purple - Harpo Johnson
- 1986: Blue City - Leroy
- 1986: Native Son - Gus
- 1987: Amazon Women on the Moon - Speaking Cop (segment "Video Date")
- 1987: Made in Heaven - Guy Blanchard / Brian Dalton
- 1988: Traxx - Deeter
- 1990: RoboCop 2 - Mayor Kuzak
- 1991: Guyver - Col. Castle
- 1991: A Rage in Harlem - Claude X
- 1991: Ambition - Freddie
- 1991: Pretty Hattie's Baby
- 1992: Eddie Presley - Nick
- 1993: CB4 - Trustus
- 1994: Puppet Master 5: The Final Chapter - Jason
- 1995: Under the Hula Moon - Duane
- 1997: Air Force One - White House Communications Officer
- 1998: Spoiler - Bounty #2
- 1998: Progeny .... Eric Davidson
- 1998: High Freakquency - Dale
- 2000: Up Against Amanda - Officer Wharton
- 2000: Today's Life - The PR Man
- 2001: The Big Leaf Tobacco Company - Mr. Franklin
- 2007: Mil Mascaras vs. the Aztec Mummy - Police Chief
- 2008: Kings of the Evening - Henry Nicholson
- 2008: Loved Ones - Captain Strader
- 2012: Making Change - Manager
- 2014: McTaggart's Fortune - Sgt. Leonard Forte
