= Straight Out of Brooklyn =

1991 film directed by Matty Rich

- Theatrical release poster
- Directed by: Matty Rich
- Written by: Matty Rich
- Produced by: Matty Rich
- Starring: George T. Odom; Ann D. Sanders; Lawrence Gilliard Jr.; Mark Malone
- Cinematography: John Rosnell
- Edited by: Jack Haigis
- Music by: Harold Wheeler
- Distributed by: The Samuel Goldwyn Company
- Release date: June 13, 1991 (United States)
- Running time: 91 minutes
- Country: United States
- Language: English
- Budget: $450,720
- Box office: $2.7 million

Straight Out of Brooklyn is a 1991 independent film directed by Matty Rich in his directorial debut. The film is a story about Dennis (played by Larry Gilliard Jr.), an African-American teen living in a housing project with his sister, mother and abusive, alcoholic father. Fed up with his family's seemingly hopeless future, he plans with his friends to rob a drug dealer.

== Plot ==
Dennis, living in a Red Hook housing project in Brooklyn, New York has had enough of poverty, and witnessing his alcoholic father beat his mother. His father is depressed and troubled from working hard for "the white man" for so many years, yet having nothing to show for it.

Dennis and two friends come up with a plan to rob a local drug dealer and split the money. One of the friends asks his uncle to borrow his car, and then a connection he has, gives him a shotgun for the operation.

Dennis keeps telling his girlfriend that they will soon have money and be able to move out of Brooklyn, but he does not actually tell her of the plan. When he does eventually explain what he is about to do, she leaves him and tells him the relationship is over. Meanwhile, his mother loses her job due to the bruises on her face from the ongoing domestic violence.

On the day of the robbery, Dennis and his friends wait in the car for the dealer to come out with a briefcase full of cash. As they drive up to him, Dennis points the gun in his face and tells him to hand over the bag, yet he doesn't actually shoot him as his friends were discussing in the car. The dealer complies, and they speed off. The dealer has now seen their faces, and after being ordered by the gangster he works for to get the money back, he goes out looking for the three.

When Dennis and his friends take the briefcase back home and realise that it contains much more than they expected, the other two get scared and realize they will be targeted for stealing the bag in the first place. After an argument with Dennis, they leave all the money with him and say they want nothing to do with it.

The same night, Dennis brings the money home to show his family and tells them they can move out of the projects, but his father is less than happy about what his son has done. This causes an argument in the house which leads to more violence and Dennis' mother having to go to the hospital.

The next day at the hospital, Dennis' father goes out for some air when the drug dealer who was robbed sees him and recognizes who he is. The dealer and his accomplices chase him and he is blocked on both sides and shot dead. At the same time, in the hospital, Dennis' mother dies with her son and daughter by her side. The movie ends with the bloodied father lying still in death, against a fence.

== Cast ==
- Larry Gilliard, Jr. as Dennis Brown
- George T. Odom as Ray Brown
- Ann D. Sanders as Frankie Brown
- Barbara Sanon as Carolyn Brown
- Reana E. Drummond as Shirley
- Matty Rich as Larry Love
- Mark Malone as Kevin
- Ali Shahid Abdul Wahhab as Luther

== Production ==
Rich wrote the screenplay when he was 17. It began as a short story and 8-minute clip, which (he explains in the outtakes for the film) he made for himself and for high school kids. He made the film over a period of two years with an amateur cast working for free. Rich himself plays Dennis' friend, Larry. He financed much of the budget with credit cards and donations from family members. Rich also raised money by going on a New York City drive time radio show and asking listeners for donations; listeners donated a total of $77,000. The total budget was $450,000. Upon release, the film was critically acclaimed and grossed $2.7 million at the box office. He was just 19 years old when the film was released.

The mother and father were based on Rich's great aunt and great uncle, respectively. Dennis is patterned after Rich's cousin. Other scenarios and characters are based on his experiences and observations in the neighborhood where Rich grew up.

The film uses original music by Harold Wheeler.

== Reception ==
Roger Ebert called Straight Out of Brooklyn "a strong, good film": "It all adds up to a convincing portrait of a big city black teen-ager who feels that if he does not take some sort of conclusive action, life will clamp him into poverty and discouragement."

On the review aggregator website Rotten Tomatoes, 80% of 10 critics' reviews are positive, with an average rating of 6.3/10.

=== Accolades ===
At the 1992 Independent Spirit Awards, Rich won the award for Best First Feature. George T. Odom was nominated for Best Supporting Male for his portrayal of the father. Composer Harold Wheeler was nominated for Best Film Music.

The film won a Special Jury Prize at the 1991 Sundance Film Festival.

== See also ==
- List of hood films
