= Dying Young =

1991 film

- Theatrical release poster
- Directed by: Joel Schumacher
- Written by: Richard Friedenberg
- Based on: Dying Young by Marti Leimbach
- Produced by: Sally Field; Kevin McCormick
- Starring: Julia Roberts; Campbell Scott; Vincent D'Onofrio; Colleen Dewhurst; David Selby
- Cinematography: Juan Ruiz Anchía
- Edited by: Robert Brown; Jim Prior
- Music by: James Newton Howard
- Production company: Fogwood Films
- Distributed by: 20th Century Fox
- Release date: June 21, 1991
- Running time: 111 minutes
- Country: United States
- Language: English
- Budget: $18 million
- Box office: $82.3 million

Dying Young is a 1991 American romantic drama film directed by Joel Schumacher. It is based on a novel of the same name by Marti Leimbach, and stars Julia Roberts and Campbell Scott with Vincent D'Onofrio, Colleen Dewhurst, David Selby, and Ellen Burstyn. The original music score was composed by James Newton Howard, with the main song "Theme from Dying Young" performed by American saxophonist Kenny G.

Dying Young was released by 20th Century Fox on June 21, 1991. The film received negative reviews from critics and grossed $82.3 million against an $18 million budget.

== Plot ==
Hilary O'Neil is a beautiful, outgoing yet cautious young woman with little luck in work or love. Having recently parted ways with her boyfriend when she caught him cheating, Hilary lives with her eccentric mother. One day, Hilary answers an ad in a newspaper for a beautiful, young nurse only to find herself being escorted out before the interview starts.

Victor Geddes is a well-educated, rich, and shy 28-year-old battling leukemia. As his health worsens progressively, and despite his father's protests, he hires Hilary to be his live-in caretaker while undergoing a traumatic chemotherapy course. She becomes insecure about her ability to care for Victor after her first exposure to the side effects of his chemotherapy treatment. Hilary researches leukemia and stocks healthier food in the kitchen.

Victor is "finished" with his chemotherapy and suggests a vacation to the coast. They rent a house and Hilary begins to feel that she is no longer needed to care for him. They fall in love and continue living on the coast. Victor hides his use of morphine to kill the pain.

During dinner with one of the friends they made at the coast, Victor has some whiskey and starts acting aggressively and irrationally. He collapses and is helped to bed. Hilary searches the garbage and discovers Victor's used syringes. She confronts him and he admits he was not finished with his chemotherapy.

Victor explains that he wants quality in his life and Hilary says he has lied to her. She calls his father, who comes to take him home, but Victor wants to stay for one last Christmas party. Hilary and he reconnect at the party and he tells her that he is leaving with his father to go back to the hospital in the morning.

After speaking with Victor's father, who says Victor wants to spend one night alone before leaving, Hilary returns to the house they rented. However, she finds him packing clothes, ready to run away and not go with his father to the hospital. Hilary confronts Victor about running away and he admits he is afraid of hoping.

At this confession, Hilary finally tells Victor she loves him and they then decide to go back to the hospital, where he will fight for his life with Hilary. The film's last scene shows Victor and Hilary leaving the house, which has a small picture of Gustav Klimt's Adam and Eve (the first painting he had showed Hilary) in the window.

== Cast ==
- Julia Roberts as Hilary O'Neil
- Campbell Scott as Victor Geddes
- Vincent D'Onofrio as Gordon
- Colleen Dewhurst as Estelle Whittier
- Ellen Burstyn as Mrs. O'Neil
- Dion Anderson as Cappy
- David Selby as Richard Geddes
- George Martin as Malachi
- A.J. Johnson as Shauna

== Music ==
The original music score was composed by James Newton Howard, with the main song "Theme from Dying Young" performed by American saxophonist Kenny G, it was nominated for a Best Pop Instrumental Performance. The soundtrack was released on July 2, 1991, by Arista Records.

No.	Title	Performer(s)	Length
1.	"Theme from Dying Young"	Kenny G	4:00
2.	"Driving North/Moving In"	James Newton Howard / Kenny G	4:15
3.	"The Clock"	James Newton Howard	1:23
4.	"Love Montage"	James Newton Howard	2:56
5.	"The Maze"	James Newton Howard	2:38
6.	"All the Way"	Jeffrey Osborne	3:30
7.	"Hillary's Theme"	James Newton Howard / Kenny G	3:08
8.	"Victor Teaches Art"	James Newton Howard	1:22
9.	"The Bluff"	James Newton Howard	0:59
10.	"San Francisco"	James Newton Howard	2:03
11.	"Victor"	James Newton Howard	1:39
12.	"All the Way"	King Curtis	5:29
13.	"I'll Never Leave You (Love Theme)"	James Newton Howard / Kenny G	2:55
Total length:			36:17

== Reception ==
Prior to its original 1991 release, Premiere predicted the film to be the highest-grossing movie that summer.

Dying Young grossed $33.6 million domestically and $48.6 million internationally, with a worldwide total of $82.2 million.

=== Critical response ===
Dying Young received generally negative reviews from critics. On Rotten Tomatoes, the film has an approval rating of 25% based on 40 reviews with the following consensus: "Dying's easy; it's making audiences care about the romance at the heart of this inert drama that proves difficult". Audiences surveyed by CinemaScore gave the film a grade of "B+" on a scale of A+ to F.

Roger Ebert gave the film two out of four stars, and wrote: "Dying Young is a long, slow slog of a movie, up to its knees in drippy self-pity as it marches wearily toward its inevitable ending". Variety wrote: "Julia's hot; Dying Young is lukewarm".

The film was nominated for three MTV Movie Awards at the 1992 MTV Movie Awards: Best Female Performance and Most Desirable Female for Julia Roberts, and Best Breakthrough Performance for Campbell Scott.
