= George T. Odom =

American actor

- Born: August 21, 1950; The Bronx, New York
- Died: September 17, 2016 (aged 66); Kannapolis, North Carolina
- Occupation: Actor
- Children: Two

George T. Odom (August 21, 1950 – c. September 21, 2016) was an American character actor, known for roles in film and television. Odom received an Independent Spirit Awards nomination for Best Supporting Male for his portrayal of Ray Brown in the 1991 independent film, Straight Out of Brooklyn.

== Biography ==
Odom was born in The Bronx, New York City, on August 21, 1950, to parents, Mary Ruth (née Brown) and Furman Odom. He was one of four siblings.His Mother Mary Ruth Brown's Great Grandfather Deacon Benjamin Brown Sr was the younger brother of Entertainer James Browns Grandfather Henry Brown( 1873-1918) both born in Barnwelll South Carolina. This information can e found on Find a grave.

In 1991, Odom made his film debut in Straight Out of Brooklyn, portraying Ray Brown, the troubled father of Dennis, played by Lawrence Gilliard Jr. Odom received a nomination for Independent Spirit Award for Best Supporting Male for his performance, but lost to David Strathairn at the 1992 ceremony. Odom's and Strathairn's fellow nominees in that category were William H. Macy, John Malkovich and Glenn Plummer.

Odom's additional films included Malcolm X in 1992 and The Hurricane in 1999 film. His television credits included guest appearances on New York Undercover, The Sopranos, Third Watch and Law & Order: Special Victims Unit. Odom appeared on eight episodes of Law & Order between 1991 and 2008.

== Death ==
George T. Odom died on September 21, 2016, in Kannapolis, North Carolina, at the age of 66. He was survived by his children, Lisa Odom and David Odom; his grandson; and his sister, Doris Odom; and predeceased by his two brothers, James Odom and Furman Odom, Jr. His funeral was held at the Greater Providence Baptist Church in Charlotte.

== Filmography ==
=== Film ===
Year	Title	Role	Notes
1991	Straight Out of Brooklyn	Ray Brown	
1992	Malcolm X	Barber #4	
1993	Who's the Man?	Albert	
1995	Sweet Nothing	Spanky	
1995	Let It Be Me	Food Line People	
1996	Gotti	The Zulu Chief	
1997	Kicked in the Head	Doorperson	
1997	White Lies	Cop at Party	
1999	Rudy Blue	Jordon Tate	
1999	The Hurricane	Big Ed	
2002	Pipe Dream	Maintenance Guy	
2007	The Speed of Life	Forrest	

=== Television ===
Year	Title	Role	Notes
1991–2008	Law & Order	Louis / Reginald Rice / Bobby Williams	8 episodes
1995	New York Undercover	Black Uni	Episode: "Eliminate the Middleman"
1999–2001	Third Watch	Rig Driver / Dwayne	2 episodes
2001	Law & Order: Special Victims Unit	Foreman	Episode: "Scourge"
2001	Law & Order: Criminal Intent	Redcap	Episode: "One"
2004	The Sopranos	Nelson	Episode: "Where's Johnny"
2005	Jonny Zero	Dada	Episode: "To Serve and to Protect"

=== Music videos ===
Year	Song	Artist	Notes
1992	"Money Don't Matter 2 Night"	Prince	
