= Richard Bradford (actor) =

American actor (1934–2016)

- Born: Richard Edwin Bradford Jr. November 10, 1934; Tyler, Texas, U.S.
- Died: March 22, 2016 (aged 81); Los Angeles, California, U.S.
- Other names: Dick Bradford
- Occupation: Actor
- Years active: 1963–2005
- Spouse: Eileen Elliott (m. 1965; div. 1984)
- Partner: Millie Perkins
- Children: 1

Richard Edwin Bradford Jr. (November 10, 1934 – March 22, 2016) was an American actor. He is best known for his leading role in the television series Man in a Suitcase (1967–1968) and supporting role in the film The Untouchables (1987).

== Early life and education ==
Richard Edwin Bradford Jr was born on November 10, 1934 in Tyler, Texas, the son of Richard Edwin Bradford and Rose Flaxman. His stepfather was a wholesale grocer. Raised by his grandparents in Conroe, Bradford received his schooling in San Antonio, Texas, then attended Texas A&M on a football scholarship.

When an injury short-circuited his budding athletic career, and a switch to baseball at Texas State University was stymied due to insufficient semester hours, Bradford, who had long admired the work of actors Marlon Brando and James Dean, finally decided to seriously pursue a long-contemplated career in acting. To this end, he made his way to New York.

== Career ==
Supporting himself by waiting tables, Bradford studied acting, first with Frank Corsaro, and finally, in 1962, was admitted to the Actors Studio, where he studied for two years, leading to roles in Studio productions such as Mother Courage (1963), June Havoc's Marathon '33 (1963), and Blues for Mister Charlie (1964). Also, he understudied Rod Steiger in the touring production of A.E. Hotchner's A Short, Happy Life (1961), an ostensibly Broadway-bound show which folded out of town.

Bradford's work caught the eye of another Actors Studio member, director Arthur Penn, who cast Bradford in The Chase (1966),. This work, in turn, attracted the attention of media impresario Lew Grade, who brought Bradford to Great Britain in 1967 for Man in a Suitcase.

In addition to his numerous TV appearances Bradford featured in many films, such as The Missouri Breaks (1976), An Enemy of the People (1978), Goin' South (1978), Badge of the Assassin (1985), The Trip to Bountiful (1985), The Untouchables (1987), and The Milagro Beanfield War (1988), but arguably his best known film role is the corrupt police captain in the 1997 film Hoodlum. Bradford appeared in the 1989 film Heart of Dixie and had notable turns in Costa-Gavras' Missing (1982), The Mean Season (1985) and The Crossing Guard (1995).

In the 1960s he appeared in the Sanctuary episode of the television series Gunsmoke and guest-starred in an episode of The High Chaparral. In the 1970s he played Lutie Bascomb in one episode of The Waltons. He guest-starred (series 2 episode 21) in an episode of Kojak, "The Goodluck Bomber", in 1975. He guest-starred in an episode of Murder, She Wrote in the 1980s. He also appeared in a guest-starring role in Hart to Hart Season 3 episode 23, To Coin a Hart. He also guest-starred in an episode in the first season of Viper. In 1987, he starred in the miniseries Amerika. In the mid-1980s he was a semi-regular cast member of the series Cagney & Lacey.

== Personal life ==
Bradford was married to ballet dancer Eileen Elliott from 1965 to 1984. He had a son, Richard Bradford III.

== Miscellaneous ==
In 1986, the Smiths used a photograph of Bradford on the cover of their single "Panic".

In 2004, Bradford gave a series of interviews and commentaries for a DVD release of Man in a Suitcase, expressing mild surprise at the ongoing popularity of the series today.

== Selected filmography ==
- 1966 The Chase as Damon Fuller
- 1967 To Chase a Million as McGill
- 1969 Operation Heartbeat (TV movie) as Dr. Joseph Gannon
- 1970 The High Chaparral ("It Takes a Smart Man") as "Tulsa Red"
- 1973 Mannix ("The Danford File") as Barney Edmonds
- 1976 The Missouri Breaks as Pete Marker
- 1978 An Enemy of the People as Captain Forster
- 1978 Goin' South as Sheriff Andrew Kyle
- 1979 More American Graffiti as Major Creech
- 1980 A Rumor of War (TV miniseries) as General Merle Rupert
- 1982 Missing as Andrew Babcock
- 1982 Hammett as Detective Bradford
- 1982 The Escape Artist as Sam, City Treasurer (uncredited)
- 1982 Lookin' to Get Out as Bernie Gold
- 1984 Running Hot as Tom Bond
- 1985 The Mean Season as Phil Wilson
- 1985 The Legend of Billie Jean as Pyatt
- 1985 Badge of the Assassin as L.J. Delsa
- 1985 The Trip To Bountiful as Sheriff
- 1987 Amerika (TV miniseries) as Ward Milford
- 1987 The Untouchables as Police Chief Mike Dorsett
- 1988 The Milagro Beanfield War as Ladd Devine
- 1988 Little Nikita as Konstantin Karpov
- 1988 Permanent Record as Leo Verdell
- 1988 Sunset as Captain Blackworth
- 1988 Wildfire as Gene
- 1989 Heart of Dixie as Judge Claibourne
- 1989 Night Game as Nelson
- 1990 Internal Affairs as Captain Grieb
- 1991 Servants of Twilight as Henry Rankin
- 1991 Ambition as Jordan
- 1991 Cold Heaven as Monsignor Cassidy
- 1992 Under Cover of Darkness as Nathan Franklin
- 1992 Dr. Giggles as Officer Hank Magruder
- 1993 Arctic Blue as Wilder
- 1994 When a Man Loves a Woman as Angry Man Watching TV (uncredited)
- 1995 Indictment: The McMartin Trial as Los Angeles District Attorney Ira Reiner
- 1995 Steal Big Steal Little as Nick Zingaro, Hood From Chicago
- 1995 The Crossing Guard as Stuart Booth
- 1996 The Chamber as Wyn Lettner
- 1997 Hoodlum as Captain Jack Foley
- 1999 Just the Ticket as Benny Moran
- 2001 The Man from Elysian Fields as Edward Rodgers
- 2001 Hawaiian Gardens as Bruno
- 2005 The Lost City as Don Donoso Fellove
