= Steven M. Martin =

American actor and filmmaker (born 1954)

Steven M. Martin (born October 24, 1954) is an American actor and filmmaker, who wrote and directed Theremin: An Electronic Odyssey, which earned him a Filmmakers Trophy at the 1994 Sundance Film Festival.

== Career ==
Martin has worked as an actor with his identical twin brother Douglas Brian Martin. They played the silent twin bodyguards Igg and Ook in Hudson Hawk and as conjoined twin Addams family members Dexter and Donald in The Addams Family and Addams Family Values. They also played as the "angry twins" in Fast Times At Ridgemont High.

In 1982, Martin co-produced the music video co-produced and directed by his brother Douglas Brian Martin for the song, "I Predict" by the rock/ new wave band, Sparks. The Martin twins played two brothers turned into human-like mutant creatures in the music video for the Devo song, "Through Being Cool" the previous year in 1981.

He made a documentary on Léon Theremin, the inventor of the theremin, one of the first electronic musical instruments, which was critically acclaimed.
