= Jeff Bornstein =

American business executive and chief financial officer

Jeffrey S. Bornstein

Personal details
- Born: November 13, 1965 (age 60) Lewiston, Maine
- Party: Republican
- Education: Northeastern University

Jeffrey S. Bornstein is an American business executive. He is a former vice chairman and the former chief financial officer of General Electric from July 2013 to October 2017. From 2005 – 2013, Bornstein served as chief financial officer of GE Capital and a Senior Vice President of General Electric. Bornstein joined GE in 1989 with the GE Power Systems’ Financial Management Program. In 1992, he joined the GE Corporate Audit Staff and then became Executive Audit Manager. In 1996, he was named Chief Financial Officer for GE Aircraft Engine Services and Vice President in 1998. In 1999, he was promoted to Chief Financial Officer of GE Plastics and served as their CFO until 2002.

In October 2017 it was announced that Bornstein after 28 years would leave GE at the end of 2017 along with two other vice chairmen.

On May 6, 2025, Donald Trump nominated Bornstein to be the Under Secretary of Defense (Comptroller)/CFO. Borstein's nomination was withdrawn on October 21, 2025.

== Personal life ==
Jeff has a wife, Jill, and four sons Mathew, Andrew, Max, and Alex. He is on the board of Northeastern University and buildOn. He has also been involved in a number of youth programs. He received his B.S. in business administration from Northeastern University.
