= Ambition (1991 film) =

- VHS cover
- Directed by: Scott D. Goldstein
- Written by: Lou Diamond Phillips
- Produced by: Scott D. Goldstein; Richard E. Johnson
- Starring: Lou Diamond Phillips; Clancy Brown; Cecilia Peck; Richard Bradford; Willard E. Pugh; Grace Zabriskie
- Cinematography: Jeff Jur
- Edited by: Scott D. Goldstein
- Music by: Leonard Rosenman
- Production company: Spirit Films
- Distributed by: Miramax Films
- Release date: May 31, 1991
- Running time: 100 minutes
- Country: United States
- Language: English
- Budget: $5 million

Ambition is a 1991 American thriller film directed by Scott D. Goldstein and written by Lou Diamond Phillips. The film stars Lou Diamond Phillips, Clancy Brown, Cecilia Peck, Richard Bradford, Willard E. Pugh, Haing S. Ngor and Grace Zabriskie. The film was released on May 31, 1991, by Miramax Films.

== Plot ==
A would-be novelist plays mind games with a mass murderer he has put to work in his bookstore

== Cast ==
- Lou Diamond Phillips as Mitchell Osgood
- Clancy Brown as Albert Merrick
- Cecilia Peck as Julie
- Richard Bradford as Jordan
- Willard E. Pugh as Freddie
- Grace Zabriskie as Mrs. Merrick
- Katherine Armstrong as Roseanne
- JD Cullum as Jack
- Haing S. Ngor as Tatay
