= Matty Rich =

American screenwriter

- Born: Matthew Statisfield Richardson; November 26, 1971 (age 54); New York City, US
- Occupations: Film director, screenwriter

Matty Rich (born Matthew Statisfield Richardson, November 26, 1971), is an American film director, screenwriter, and video game executive.

== Career ==
Rich broke into the film world with the 1991 film Straight Out of Brooklyn, which was financed by credit cards and donations. Rich also plays Larry Love, a major character in the film. The low-budget independent film grossed $2.7 million at the box office and only cost $450,000 to make. Rich wrote the film as a short story at age 17, and first filmed it as an 8-minute short for himself and high school students. The film was critically acclaimed, and Rich won many awards, including an Independent Spirit Award.

In interviews, Rich had proudly stated that even though he dropped out of New York University's (NYU) famed Tisch School of the Arts after one month (he accused the faculty of racism), he still made a successful film. This drew criticism from Spike Lee, a Tisch graduate, who accused Rich of being "ignorant". Rich's second film, 1994's The Inkwell, received mixed reviews. He has not made another film since.

In 2005, Rich re-emerged as the director and screenwriter of the video game, 187 Ride or Die which was not a success.

He is CEO of Matty Rich Games, a Los Angeles–based gaming company that specializes in family-oriented and Christian-themed video games geared toward the African-American community.

== Personal ==
On January 19, 2008, Rich married publicist Leah "Reid" Johnson. They live in Los Angeles.
