= Marti Leimbach =

American writer

- Born: July 16, 1963 (age 63); Washington, D.C., U.S.
- Education: Harvard University (BA)
- Occupation: Novelist
- Writing career
- Genres: Fiction, literary fiction
- Notable works: The Man from Saigon; Dying Young

Marti Leimbach (born July 16, 1963) is an American fiction writer. Her first novel, Dying Young (1990), was an international bestseller and the basis of the film, Dying Young, starring Julia Roberts, Campbell Scott, David Selby and Vincent D'Onofrio.

Marti Leimbach's other novels include Sun Dial Street (1992) and Love and Houses (1997), after which she took time away from writing when her youngest child was diagnosed with autism. Later she wrote Daniel Isn't Talking (2006), which by her own admission contains some autobiographical information derived from her real-life experience as a mother of an autistic child. Daniel Isn’t Talking was optioned by Fox 2000 with a film planned for 2010.

Born in Washington, D.C. in 1963 to Mary Leimbach, a news reporter, and Leonard Leimbach, who died when the author was four years old. Leimbach's first novel, which centers around the death of a young man, was written while her own mother was dying. In an interview with Marian Christy of The Boston Globe, she expressed regret that neither of her parents had lived to see her first publication.

Marti Leimbach attended Winston Churchill High School, then Harvard University, where she received a BA in English and American Literature and Language. She was a Regent's Fellow at the University of California, Irvine, where she wrote Dying Young.

Her most recent novel, The Man From Saigon, is published in the United Kingdom by Fourth Estate/HarperCollins in 2009 and in the United States by Nan A. Talese/Random House in 2010.

In 2009, Leimbach donated the short story Boys in Cars to Oxfam's 'Ox-Tales' project, four collections of UK stories written by 38 authors. Her story was published in the 'Earth' collection.

== Novels ==
- Dying Young (1990)
- Sun Dial Street (1992)
- Love and Houses (1997)
- Daniel Isn’t Talking (2006)
- The Man From Saigon (2009)
- Age of Consent (2016)
