= Fever (1991 film) =

- DVD Cover
- Written by: Larry Brothers
- Directed by: Larry Elikann
- Starring: Armand Assante; Marcia Gay Harden; Sam Neill; John Achorn; Joe Spano
- Music by: Michel Colombier
- Country of origin: United States
- Original language: English

Production
- Producer: Nick Gillott
- Cinematography: Bojan Bazelli
- Editor: Eric A. Sears
- Running time: 99 minutes
- Production companies: HBO Pictures; Saban/Scherick Productions

Original release
- Network: HBO
- Release: May 11, 1991

Fever is a 1991 made-for-TV thriller film, starring Armand Assante, Marcia Gay Harden and Sam Neill. It was written by Larry Brothers and directed by Larry Elikann. The film was first aired at HBO on May 11, 1991.

== Plot ==
Ray had just left prison and looks to resume his relationship with Lacy. However, she is now, almost married to Elliott and doesn't want to know anything about him. When she is kidnapped by Ray's former associates, he and Eliott needs to join forces to save her.

== Cast ==
- Armand Assante as Ray
- Marcia Gay Harden as Lacy
- Sam Neill as Eliott
- John Achorn as Parole Board Member
- Joe Spano as Junkman
- Mark Boone Junior as Leonard
- Jon Gries as Bobby
- Gordon Clapp as Meeks
- Gregg Henry as Dexter
- Francesca Buller as Denise
