= Sharon Washington (actress) =

American actress and playwright (born 1960)

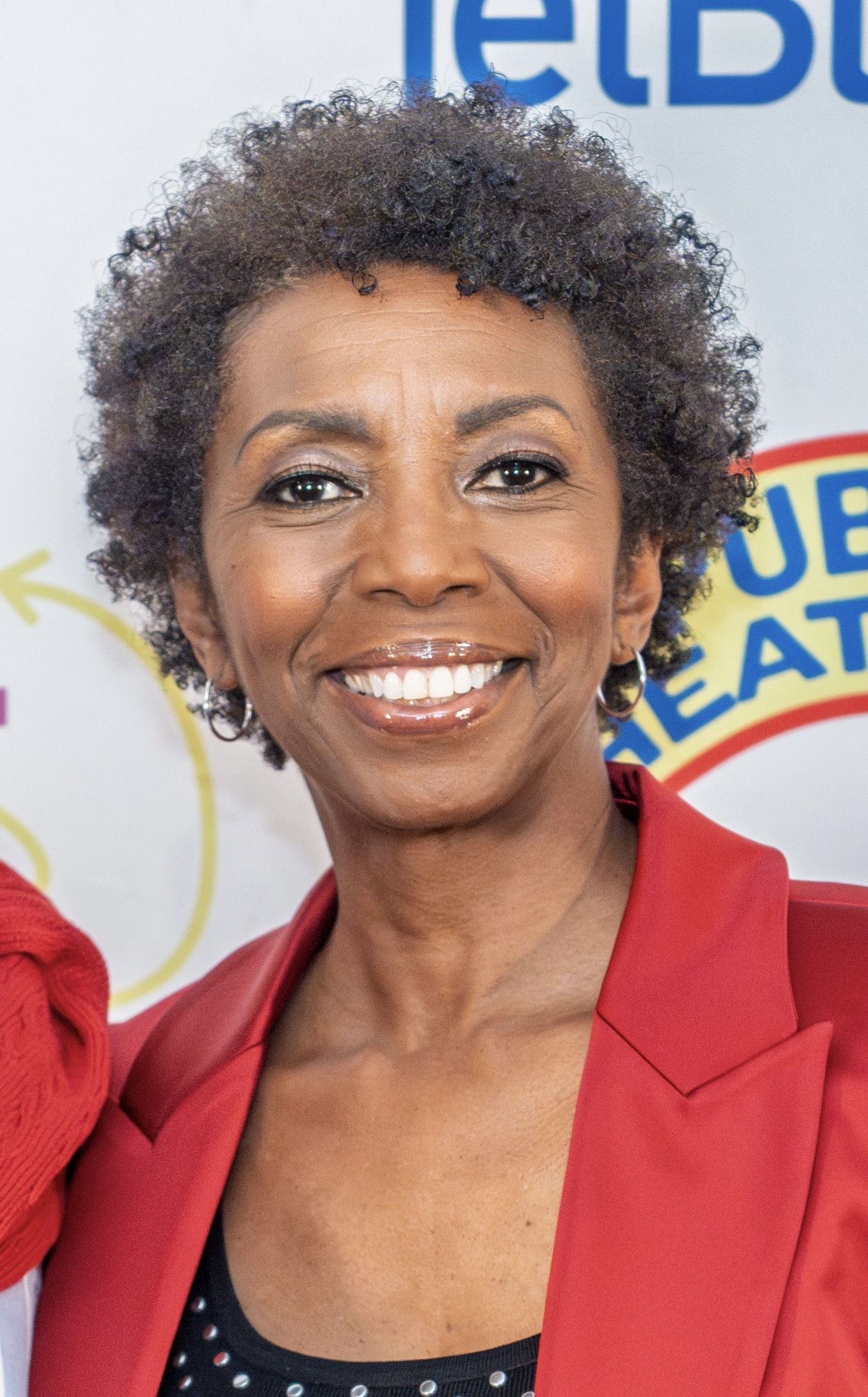
- Washington in 2025
- Born: Sharon Washington; September 12, 1960 (age 66); New York City, U.S.
- Education: The Dalton School; Dartmouth College (BA); Yale University (MFA)
- Occupations: Actress; playwright
- Years active: 1987–present
- Notable work: Feeding the Dragon (2018); New York, New York (2023)
- Spouse: Chuck Schultz (m. 2002)
- Awards: Tony Award (nomination); Outer Critics Circle Award (nomination); Lucille Lortel Award (nomination); Drama League Award (nomination)

Sharon Washington (born September 12, 1960) is an American actress and playwright, best known for her work on stage. In 2018, her one-woman show Feeding the Dragon was produced Off-Broadway by Primary Stages, earning nominations for the Lucille Lortel Award for Outstanding Solo Show and the Outer Critics Circle Award for Outstanding Solo Performance. The play was subsequently published by Oberon Modern Plays and adapted as an Audible Original.

In 2023, Washington co-authored the book for New York, New York with David Thompson. The musical, which features music by John Kander, and lyrics by Fred Ebb and Lin-Manuel Miranda, premiered on Broadway at the St. James Theatre. Loosely based on the 1977 film of the same name by Martin Scorsese, the production earned nine Tony Award nominations, including Best Musical and Best Book of a Musical.

A veteran stage performer, Washington has appeared on Broadway in The Scottsboro Boys at the Lyceum Theatre, as well as numerous Off-Broadway productions at The Public Theater, Manhattan Theatre Club, Roundabout Theatre Company, Lincoln Center Theater, Second Stage Theater, Vineyard Theatre, and New York City Center Encores!, among others. Her film roles include Debra Kane in Joker (2019) and its sequel Joker: Folie à Deux (2024). On television, she is best known for playing Joyce Thomas in the Starz original series Power Book III: Raising Kanan (2021–2025).

== Early life and education ==
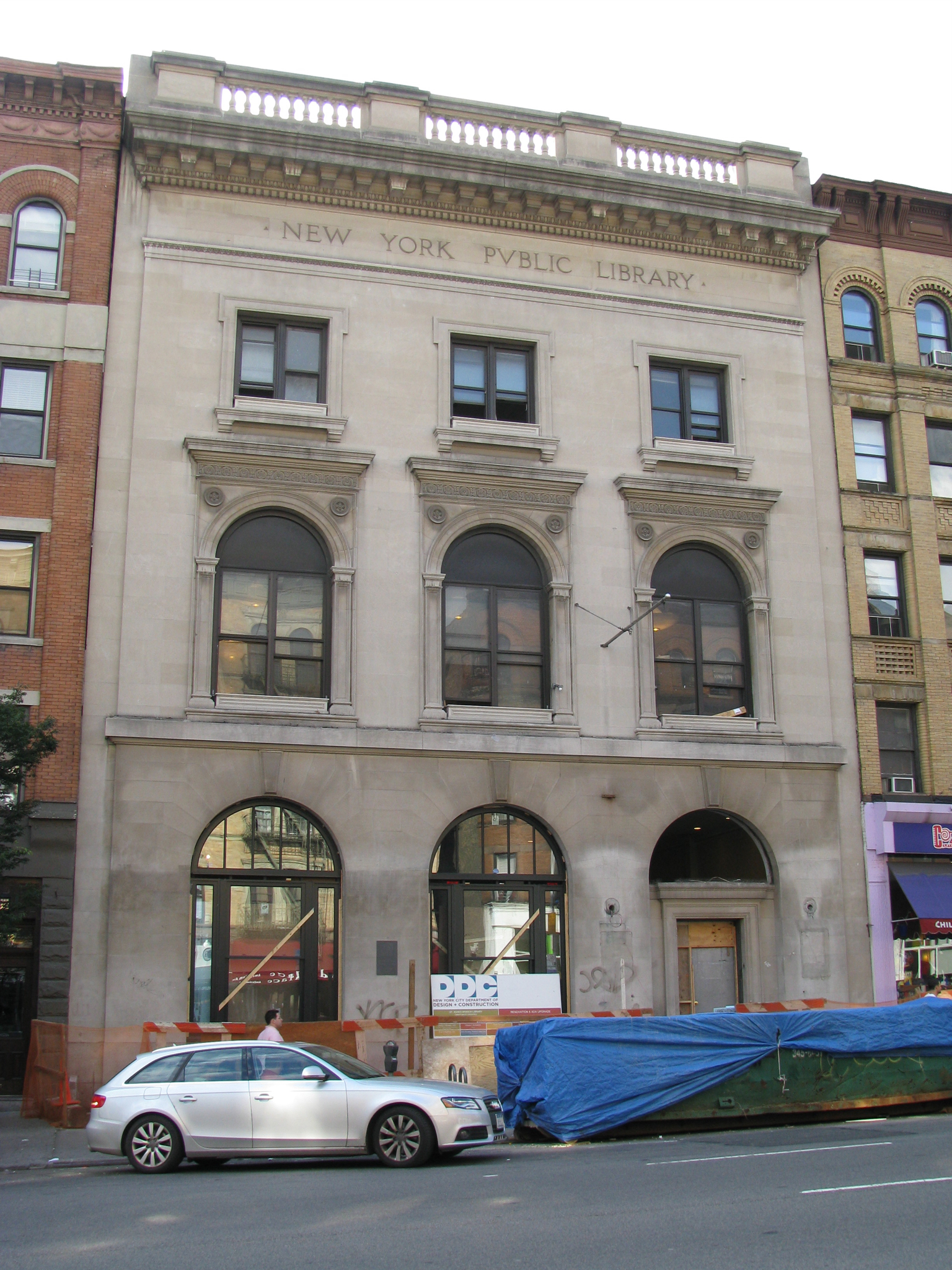
The St. Agnes branch of the New York Public Library where Washington lived as a child.

Washington was born on September 12, 1960, in New York City to Connie and George King Washington. Her mother was a New York native who worked as a church secretary. Her father was a South Carolina native who served in the Navy, and later worked as a custodian for the New York Public Library.

Due to her father's work, Washington grew up in an apartment inside the St. Agnes branch of the New York Public Library on Manhattan's Upper West Side. She graduated from The Dalton School on the Upper East Side. She later matriculated to Dartmouth College, earning a B.A. in Government and African American Studies in 1981. After college, she worked as an assistant to Barry Grove, the Executive Producer of Manhattan Theatre Club. She subsequently earned an M.F.A. in Acting from the Yale School of Drama in 1988.

== Career ==
=== Acting ===
Washington began her professional career in 1987 while still a student at Yale Drama School, appearing as Grace in the World Premiere of August Wilson's The Piano Lesson at the Yale Repertory Theatre, directed by Lloyd Richards. The following year she understudied the role of Frosine in Molière's The Miser at the Yale Rep, directed by Andrei Belgrader. After graduating from Yale, Washington made her Off-Broadway debut as Valeria in William Shakespeare's Coriolanus at The Public Theater, appearing opposite Christopher Walken in the title role. The production was directed by Steven Berkoff. In 2010, Washington made her Broadway debut as The Lady in the Kander and Ebb musical The Scottsboro Boys at the Lyceum Theatre, directed by Susan Stroman. The production received a record 12 Tony Award nominations, including for Best Musical.

Washington's early Off-Broadway roles include Helen in Shakespeare's Cymbeline at The Public Theater's Shakespeare in the Park (1989) directed by JoAnne Akalaitis, appearing opposite Joan Cusack as Imogen; Anne Neville in Shakespeare's Richard III at The Public Theater (1990) directed by Steven Berkoff, appearing opposite Denzel Washington as Richard; and Natella Abashwili (The Governor's Wife) in Bertolt Brecht's The Caucasian Chalk Circle at The Public Theater (1990) directed by George C. Wolfe, appearing opposite Charlayne Woodard as Gresha.

Her additional Off-Broadway credits as an actress, include Cheryl West's Before It Hits Home at The Public Theater/Second Stage Theater (1992) directed by Tazewell Thompson; Catherine Butterfield's Joined at the Head at Manhattan Theatre Club (1992) directed by Pamela Berlin; Arthur Laurents' The Radical Mystique at Manhattan Theatre Club (1995) directed by Laurents; Kia Corthron's Seeking the Genesis at Manhattan Theatre Club (1997) directed by Kaia Calhoun; Alan Ayckbourn's House & Garden plays at Manhattan Theatre Club (2002) directed by John Tillinger; Michele Lowe's String of Pearls at Primary Stages (2004) directed by Eric Simonson; David Hare's Stuff Happens at The Public Theater (2006) directed by Daniel J. Sullivan; J. T. Rogers's The Overwhelming at Roundabout Theatre Company (2007) directed by Max Stafford-Clark; Patrick Barnes's Let Me Put It This Way at The Public Theater (2008) directed by Maria Manuela Goyanes; Kander and Ebb's The Scottsboro Boys at Vineyard Theatre (2010) directed by Susan Stroman; Kurt Weill & Maxwell Anderson's Lost in the Stars at New York City Center Encores! (2011) directed by Gary Griffin; Colman Domingo's Wild With Happy at The Public Theater (2012) directed by Robert O'Hara, for which she was nominated for the 2013 Lucille Lortel Award for Outstanding Lead Actress in a Play; JC Lee's Luce at Lincoln Center Theater (2013) directed by May Adrales; Billy Porter's While I Yet Live at Primary Stages (2014) directed by Sheryl Kaller; Colman Domingo's Dot at Vineyard Theatre (2016) directed by Susan Stroman; Washington's own one-woman play, Feeding the Dragon at Primary Stages (2018) directed by Maria Mileaf; Queen Margaret in Shakespeare's Richard III at The Public Theater (2022) directed by Robert O'Hara; and Harvey Fierstein's La Cage aux Folles at New York City Center Encores! (2026) directed by Robert O'Hara.

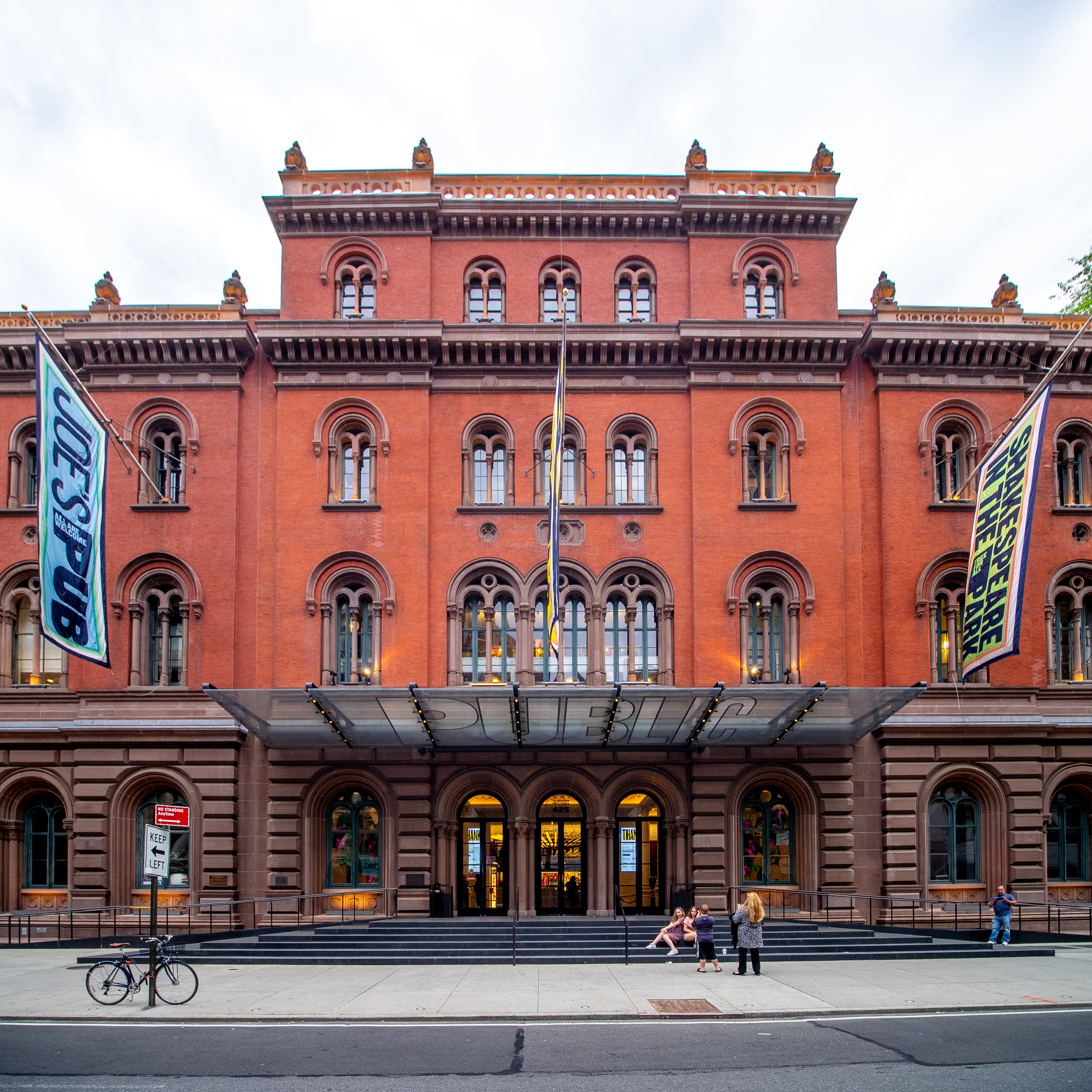
Washington made her Off-Broadway debut at The Public Theater, where she's appeared in productions Coriolanus, Cymbeline, Richard III, The Caucasian Chalk Circle, Before It Hits Home, and Stuff Happens, among others.

Washington's Regional theatre credits include George Bernard Shaw's Man and Superman at Baltimore Center Stage (1989) directed by Stan Wojewodski Jr.; David Feldshuh's Miss Evers' Boys at Philadelphia Theatre Company (1992) directed by Kent Gash; William Shakespeare's Twelfth Night at Arena Stage (1993) directed by Douglas C. Wager; Shakespeare's Romeo and Juliet at Shakespeare Theatre of New Jersey (1994) directed by Jimmy Bohr; Lonne Elder III's Ceremonies in Dark Old Men at Long Wharf Theatre (1995) directed by Kenneth L. Richardson; Kia Corthron's Digging Eleven at Hartford Stage (1999) directed by Reggie Montgomery; Cheryl West's Jar the Floor at the Seattle Repertory Theatre (2000) directed by Gilbert McCauley; Michele Lowe's String of Pearls at City Theatre (2003) directed by Eric Simonson; Tracey Scott Wilson's The Story at Long Wharf Theatre (2004) directed by Loretta Greco; Lynn Nottage's Intimate Apparel at the Guthrie Theatre (2005) directed by Timothy Bond; Shakespeare's King Lear at Denver Center Theatre Company (2007) directed by Kent Thompson; Shakespeare's The Merry Wives of Windsor at Denver Center Theatre Company (2008) directed by David Ivers; Kander and Ebb's The Scottsboro Boys at the Guthrie Theatre (2010) directed by Susan Stroman; Billy Porter's While I Yet Live at Powerhouse Theater (2012) directed Ed Sylvanus Iskandar; Colman Domingo's Dot at the Actors Theatre of Louisville's 39th annual Humana Festival of New American Plays (2015) directed by Meredith McDonough; August Wilson's Seven Guitars at the Actors Theatre of Louisville (2015) directed by Colman Domingo; and Washington's own one-woman play, Feeding the Dragon at City Theatre (2016) and Hartford Stage (2018) directed by Maria Mileaf.

Washington made her small screen debut in 1988 in an episode of the short lived ABC action series A Man Called Hawk. Her other television appearances include the NBC soap opera Guiding Light (1992); the ABC miniseries North and South (1994); the NBC procedural Law & Order (1994–2006); the Fox science fiction series Space: Above and Beyond (1995); the Fox police drama New York Undercover (1996); the CBS sitcom Cosby (1997); the ABC sitcom Soul Man (1998); the ABC family drama Trinity (1998); the NBC procedural Law & Order: SVU (2000–2016); the FX legal thriller Damages (2009); the USA medical comedy-drama Royal Pains (2009); the NBC procedural Law & Order: Criminal Intent (2009); the CBS police procedural NYC 22 (2012); the Blip.tv comedy-drama Hustling (2012–2014) for which she won an Indie Series Award for Best Supporting Actress; the USA police procedural White Collar (2012); the CBS crime drama Golden Boy (2013); the NBC crime thriller The Blacklist (2013); the Fox superhero crime drama Gotham (2014–2015); the Hulu miniseries The Looming Tower (2018); the CBS military drama The Code (2019); the Showtime crime drama City on a Hill (2019); the CBS political drama Madam Secretary (2019); the ABC legal drama For Life (2020); the CBS legal drama Bull (2021); and the Starz crime drama Power Book III: Raising Kanan (2021–2025).

Washington made her big screen debut as Estelle in the 1992 Spike Lee film Malcom X. Her other film appearances include Die Hard with a Vengeance (1995); The Long Kiss Goodnight (1996); The Confession (2000); Waking the Dead, Enslavement: The True Story of Fanny Kemble, and Lisa Picard is Famous (2000); 3 A.M. (2001) School of Rock (2003); Half Nelson and Freedomland (2006); Michael Clayton and The Life Before Her Eyes (2007); Taking Chance (2009); An Invisible Sign and Rocksteady (2010); The Bourne Legacy (2012); Torn (2013); Mistress America (2015); Wiener-Dog (2016); Seaside and On the Basis of Sex (2018); The Kitchen and Joker (2019); Sing Sing (2023); and Joker: Folie à Deux (2024).

=== Feeding the Dragon ===
In December 2009, a feature article in The New York Times entitled "Stoking the Furnace, and a Love for Books," chronicled Washington's unique childhood growing up within the walls of the New York Public Library. Her mailbox was subsequently inundated with people "wanting to write her story." Washington ultimately opted to write her own story, which eventually took the form of her one-woman play, Feeding the Dragon.

Feeding the Dragon had its world premiere at City Theatre in Pittsburgh, PA in October 2016. The play was later premiered Off-Broadway at Primary Stages in March 2018, in association with Jamie deRoy and Hartford Stage. All three productions starred Washington, and were directed by Maria Mileaf. While developing the script, Washington was a 2017-18 Tow Foundation Playwright-in-Residence at Primary Stages. The play received critical acclaim, holding a score of 82% on the review aggregator Show-Score. Pete Hempstead, in a review for TheaterMania praised the production, writing "Washington has a storyteller's gift for animating her tale with lively and distinct impersonations of people from her past, and her easygoing delivery has a way of making us feel like we're taking part in a story-time hour. That endearing aspect of the show makes Washington a pleasure to watch."

Feeding the Dragon was nominated for the Lucille Lortel Award for Outstanding Solo Show and the Outer Critics Circle Award for Outstanding Solo Performance. The play was subsequently published by Oberon Modern Plays and adapted as an Audible Original. As an audio play, Feeding the Dragon was selected as an "Audible Essentials Top 100 pick" and has been optioned for development into a live-action/animated YA series. Washington is currently working on a picture book adaptation of the play, entitled The Little Girl Who Lived in the Library for Scholastic. Washington's creative journey working on the play is chronicled in the award-winning documentary film When My Sleeping Dragon Woke directed by Chuck Schultz and Judah Lev-Dickstein.

=== New York, New York ===
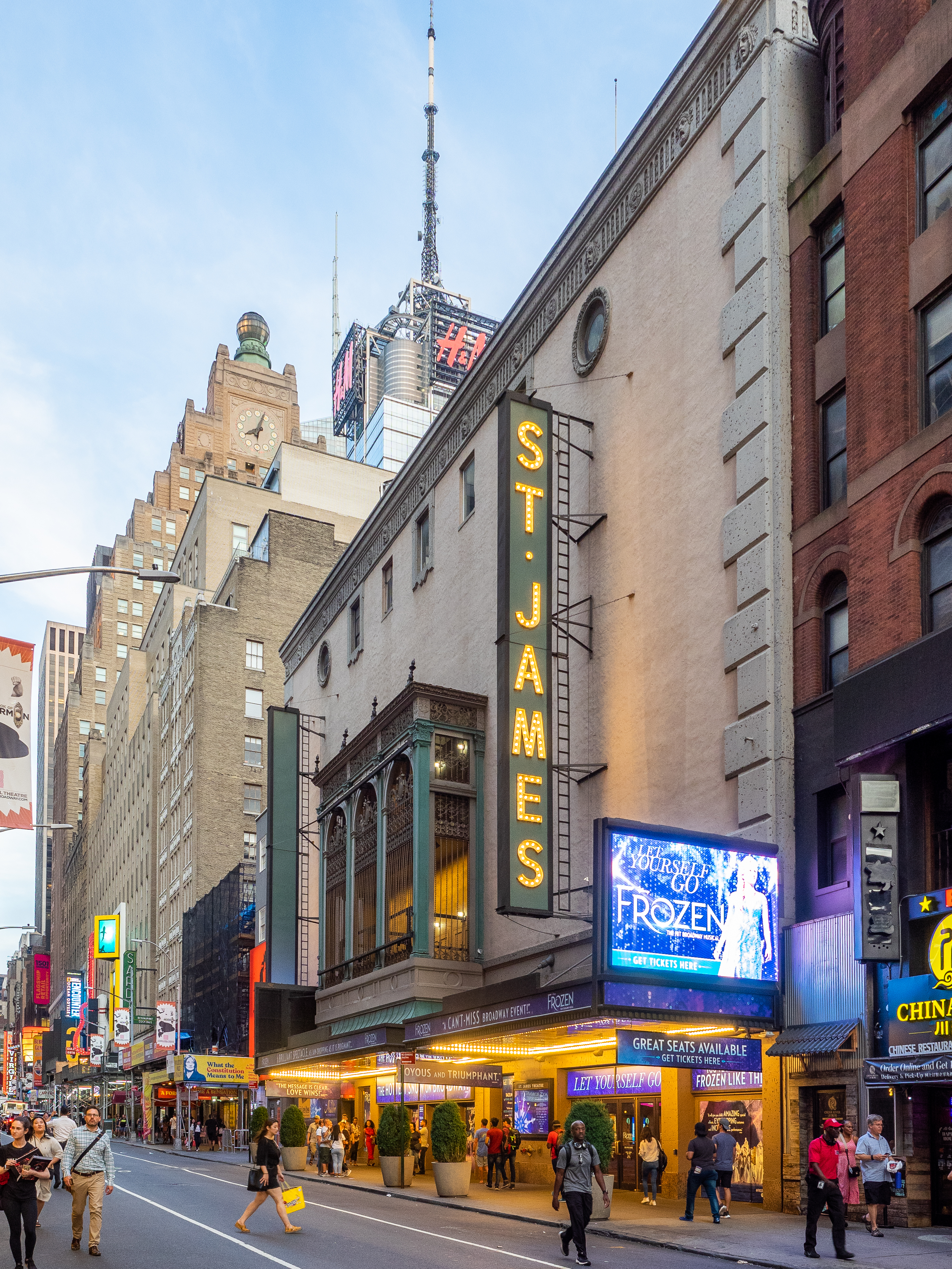
New York, New York premiered on Broadway at the St. James Theatre, running from March 24 through July 30, 2023.

In 2023, alongside David Thompson, Washington co-authored the book for New York, New York, a musical with music by John Kander, lyrics by Fred Ebb and Lin-Manuel Miranda. Inspired by and loosely based on the 1977 film of the same name by Martin Scorsese, the musical premiered on Broadway at the St. James Theatre with the first preview occurring on March 24, 2023. The cast, which was announced on February 1 of the same year, included Clyde Alves, Emily Skinner, and Janet Dacal. It officially opened on April 26, 2023, and closed on July 30, 2023, having played 33 previews and 110 regular performances.

Despite receiving mixed reviews and becoming a commercial disappointment, the Broadway production, directed and choreographed by Susan Stroman, received nine Tony Awards at the 76th Tony Awards including Best Musical and Best Book of a Musical, winning the award for Best Scenic Design in a Musical. Additionally, the production received six Drama Desk Award nominations, four Drama League Award nominations, and twelve Outer Critics Circle Award nominations, including for Outstanding New Broadway Musical.

== Personal life ==
Washington has been married to documentary filmmaker Chuck Schultz since 2002. The couple lives together in Millbrook, New York.

Washington serves on the board of overseers for the Hopkins Center for the Arts at her alma mater, Dartmouth College. She previously served on the National Board of Directors for SAG-AFTRA.

== Credits ==
=== Film ===
Year	Title	Role	Notes	Ref.
1992	Malcolm X	Augusta		
1993	Blind Spot	Donna	TV movie	
1995	Die Hard With a Vengeance	Officer Jane		
1996	The Long Kiss Goodnight	Fran Henessey		
1999	The Confession	Hospital Administrator		
2000	Waking the Dead	Kelly		
2000	Enslavement: The True Story of Fanny Kemble	Psyche	TV movie	
2000	Lisa Picard is Famous	Anna Chenier		
2001	3 A.M.	Mother		
2003	School of Rock	Alicia's Mother		
2006	Half Nelson	Suzanne		
2006	Freedomland	Rose		
2007	Michael Clayton	Pam		
2007	The Life Before Her Eyes	Nurse		
2009	Taking Chance	Mortuary Nurse	TV movie	
2010	An Invisible Sign	Levan's Mom		
2010	Rocksteady	Winnie Cook		
2012	The Bourne Legacy	C-Team		
2013	Torn	Agent Reese		
2015	Mistress America	Professor		
2016	Wiener-Dog	Phillips		
2017	Approaching a Breakthrough	Professor Spiegel	Short film	
2018	Seaside	Angela		
2018	On the Basis of Sex	Pauli Murray		
2019	The Kitchen	Estelle		
2019	Joker	Debra Kane		
2021	Down with the King	Darlene		
2022	88	Principal		
2023	Sing Sing	Clemency Hearing Chair		
2024	Joker: Folie à Deux	Debra Kane		

=== Television ===
Year	Title	Role	Notes	Ref.
1989	A Man Called Hawk	Carol	Episode: "Poison"	
1989	Guiding Light	Karen Kennedy	Episode: #1.11482	
1994	North and South	Jane	3 episodes	
1994–2006	Law & Order	Various	4 episodes	
1995	Space: Above and Beyond	Crew Chief	Episode: "Hostile Visit"	
1996	One Life to Live	Dr. Laurie Phillips	Recurring, Season 28	
1996	New York Undercover	Dr. Brown	Episode: "Blue Boy"	
1997	Cosby	Beth Edwards	Episode: "I'm OK, You're Hilton"	
1998	Soul Man	Summer Kincaid	Episode: "Grabbed by an Angel"	
1998	Trinity	Lily	Episode: "In a Yellow Wood"	
2000–2016	Law & Order: Special Victims Unit	Various	7 episodes	
2009	Damages	Monique Bryant	2 episodes	
2009	Law & Order: Criminal Intent	Hillis	Episode: "Folie a Deux"	
2009	Royal Pains	Nancy	2 episodes	
2012	NYC 22	Kia	Episode: "Schooled"	
2012	White Collar	Lawyer	Episode: "Compromising Positions"	
2012–2014	Hustling	Lena	9 episodes	
2013	Golden Boy	Rosemary Clay	Episode: "Pilot"	
2013	The Blacklist	Prosecutor	Episode: "The Stewmaker"	
2014	Blue Bloods	Dorris Cooper	Episode: "Manhattan Queens"	
2014–2015	Gotham	Molly Mathis	2 episodes	
2018	The Looming Tower	Judith	7 episodes	
2019	The Code	Tiffany Dixon Green	2 episodes	
2019	City on a Hill	Shirley Hanlon	3 episodes	
2019	Madam Secretary	Chelsea Weldon	Episode: "Deepfake"	
2020	For Life	Barbara	3 episodes	
2021	Bull	Olivia Powell	3 episodes	
2021–2025	Power Book III: Raising Kanan	Joyce Thomas	12 episodes	
2023	Great Performances	Queen Margaret	Episode: "Richard III"	

=== Music videos ===
Year	Title	Role	Artist
1988	"Plaything"	Dancer	Rebbie Jackson

=== Stage ===
Year	Title	Role	Playwright	Venue	Ref.
1987	The Piano Lesson	Grace	August Wilson	Yale Repertory Theatre	
1988	The Miser	Frosine (u/s)	Molière	Yale Repertory Theatre	
1989	Man and Superman	Violet Robinson	George Bernard Shaw	Baltimore Center Stage	
1989	Coriolanus	Valeria	William Shakespeare	The Public Theater	
1989	Cymbeline	Lady Helen/Soldier	William Shakespeare	The Public Theater	
1990	Richard III	Lady Anne	William Shakespeare	The Public Theater	
1990	The Caucasian Chalk Circle	Natella Abashwili	Bertolt Brecht	The Public Theater	
1991	The Dramatic Circle	Alice Alexander	Adrienne Kennedy	WNYC	
1991	Miss Evers' Boys	Eunice Evers	David Feldshuh	Philadelphia Theatre Company	
1992	Before It Hits Home	Simone/Miss Peterson	Cheryl West	Second Stage Theater & The Public Theater	
1992	Joined at the Head	Political Woman/Doctor	Catherine Butterfield	Manhattan Theatre Club	
1993	Twelfth Night	Viola	William Shakespeare	Arena Stage	
1994	Romeo and Juliet	Lady Capulet	William Shakespeare	Shakespeare Theatre of New Jersey	
1995	Ceremonies in Dark Old Men	Adele Eloise Parker	Lonne Elder III	Long Wharf Theatre	
1995	The Radical Mystique	Janice Catlett	Arthur Laurents	Manhattan Theatre Club	
1997	Seeking the Genesis	Teacher	Kia Corthron	Manhattan Theatre Club	
1999	Digging Eleven	Ray	Kia Corthron	Hartford Stage	
2000	Jar the Floor	Maydee	Cheryl West	Seattle Repertory Theatre	
2002	House & Garden	Fran Briggs	Alan Ayckbourn	Manhattan Theatre Club	
2003	String of Pearls	Woman #4	Michele Lowe	City Theatre	
2004	The Story	Pat	Tracey Scott Wilson	Long Wharf Theatre & The Public Theater	
2004	String of Pearls	Woman #4	Michele Lowe	Primary Stages	
2005	Intimate Apparel	Esther	Lynn Nottage	Guthrie Theater	
2006	Stuff Happens	Condoleezza Rice	David Hare	The Public Theater	
2007	The Overwhelming	Élise Kayitesi	J. T. Rogers	Roundabout Theatre Company	
2007	King Lear	Goneril	William Shakespeare	Denver Center Theatre Company	
2008	Let Me Put it This Way	Sara	Patrick Barnes	The Public Theater	
2008	Merry Wives of Windsor	Mistress Page	William Shakespeare	Denver Center Theatre Company	
2010	The Scottsboro Boys	The Lady	Kander and Ebb	Vineyard Theatre	
2010	The Scottsboro Boys	The Lady	Kander and Ebb	Guthrie Theater	
2010	The Scottsboro Boys	The Lady	Kander and Ebb	Lyceum Theatre	
2011	Lost in the Stars	Grace Kumalo	Maxwell Anderson & Kurt Weill	New York City Center Encores!	
2012	Wild With Happy	Adelaide/Aunt Glo	Colman Domingo	The Public Theater	
2013	Luce	Harriet	JC Lee	Lincoln Center Theater	
2014	While I Yet Live	Eva	Billy Porter	Primary Stages	
2015	Dot	Shelly	Colman Domingo	Actors Theatre of Louisville	
2015	Seven Guitars	Louise	August Wilson	Actors Theatre of Louisville	
2016	Dot	Shelly	Colman Domingo	Vineyard Theatre	
2016	Feeding the Dragon	Various	Sharon Washington	City Theatre	
2018	Feeding the Dragon	Various	Sharon Washington	Hartford Stage	
2018	Feeding the Dragon	Various	Sharon Washington	Primary Stages	
2022	Richard III	Queen Margaret	William Shakespeare	The Public Theater	
2026	La Cage aux Folles	Marie	Harvey Fierstein	New York City Center Encores!	

== Awards and nominations ==
Year	Associations	Category	Work	Result	Ref.
2013	Lucille Lortel Award	Outstanding Lead Actress in a Play	Wild With Happy	Nominated	
2013	Audelco Award	Outstanding Lead Actress	Wild With Happy	Won	
2014	Indie Series Award	Best Supporting Actress (Drama)	Hustling	Nominated	
2015	Indie Series Award	Best Supporting Actress (Drama)	Hustling	Won	
2018	Outer Critics Circle Award	Outstanding Solo Performance	Feeding the Dragon	Nominated	
2018	Lucille Lortel Award	Outstanding Solo Show	Feeding the Dragon	Nominated	
2018	Audelco Award	Outstanding Solo Performance	Feeding the Dragon	Won	
2023	Drama League Award	Outstanding Production of a Musical	New York, New York	Nominated	
2023	Outer Critics Circle Award	Outstanding New Broadway Musical	New York, New York	Nominated	
2023	Tony Award	Best Musical	New York, New York	Nominated	
2023	Tony Award	Best Book of a Musical	New York, New York	Nominated	
