= Yvette Hawkins =

American actress (1940–1995)

- Born: September 28, 1940; New York City, U.S.
- Died: April 10, 1995 (aged 54); New York City, U.S.
- Occupation: Actress

Yvette Hawkins (September 28, 1940 – April 10, 1995) was an American actress on Broadway, on television, and in films.

== Early life ==
Yvette Hawkins was born in New York City.

== Career ==
Earlier in her career, Hawkins was a member of the New Lafayette Theatre in Harlem. She was also involved with the Play-House of the Ridiculous, with John Vaccaro and Ronald Tavel.

Broadway credits for Hawkins included James Baldwin's The Amen Corner (1965), Lolita (1981), Checkmates (1988) and The Shadow Box (1994). She was also busy off-Broadway and in regional theatre, with a role in The Last Street Play with Morgan Freeman in 1977, in a touring company of Ntozake Shange's For Colored Girls Who Have Considered Suicide / When the Rainbow Is Enuf in 1978, and as James McDaniel's mother in Cheryl L. West's Before It Hits Home in 1992, among many others.

Hawkins appeared in films such as Mighty Aphrodite (1995), Zebrahead (1992), Mississippi Masala (1991), Lean on Me (1989), and Nighthawks (1981). Her television acting credits ranged from soap operas As the World Turns and Guiding Light to dramas Cagney & Lacey and Law & Order. She was also in the cast of Ghostwriter, a children's mystery series. She was credited as a writer on the Children's Television Workshop health show Feelin' Good in the mid-1970s.

== Personal life ==
Yvette Hawkins was married briefly, to writer Sam Greenlee, in 1978. She died from lung cancer in 1995, aged 54 years, in New York City.
