= Bronzeville (play) =

A flyer announcing the premiere of Bronzeville

Bronzeville is a play written by Tim Toyama and Aaron Woolfolk. Developed and produced by the Robey Theatre Company, the original production and two subsequent revivals were directed by Ben Guillory.

The play debuted at the Los Angeles Theatre Center on April 17, 2009. Woolfolk and Toyama were subsequently nominated for an Ovation Award, and the NAACP Theatre Awards alongside Guillory.

The play is named after a common nickname given to the Little Tokyo, Los Angeles, neighborhood from 1942 to 1945, when Japanese Americans were put into internment camps. During that time, many African Americans who migrated to California from the southern United States settled in Little Tokyo, which became known as Bronzeville.

== Plot ==
The play is set between spring 1942 and spring 1945. It tells the story of an African American family, the Goodwins, who move from Mississippi to Los Angeles. When they discover a Japanese American man, "Henry" Tahara, hiding in their attic, the family must confront their values as they struggle to protect themselves and do what is right.

== Development and Production ==
Tim Toyama and Aaron Woolfolk both independently learned about Little Tokyo's Bronzeville period—Toyama from a friend, and Woolfolk after seeing a mural of Charlie Parker in the neighborhood.

In 2007, Toyama approached Robey Theatre Company's artistic director Ben Guillory about producing the play and requested a recommendation for an African American writer to co-author the work. Guillory recommended Woolfolk, who at the time was developing the film The Harimaya Bridge about an African American man in Japan. Toyama and Woolfolk developed Bronzeville over the next two years.

In 2008, Toyama entered the play into the East West Players, David Henry Hwang Writer's Institute, where he and Woolfolk further developed the play and where it was performed for the first time in a staged reading. Bronzeville premiered on April 17, 2009, at the Los Angeles Theatre Center. It was sold out and extended by two weeks. Although some early marketing materials stated that Bronzeville was based on a true story, this was not accurate.

Bronzeville had its first revival as an abridged version in May 2011 at the Manzanar National Historic Site in Independence, California. It was produced by the Robey Theatre Company, Manzanar National Historic Site, and Inyo Council for the Arts.

A second, full-length revival was produced by the Robey Theatre Company, the Latino Theater Company, and Kathie Foley Meyer. It was staged at the Los Angeles Theatre Center in June and July 2013 as part of the Project Bronzeville festival.

On March 28, 2014, a staged reading of the play was presented by The Lorraine Hansberry Theatre in San Francisco, California.

== Reception and awards ==
Bronzeville received positive reviews. The LA Stage Times called the 2013 revival "a revelation" that "packs a powerful punch."

Woolfolk and Toyama were nominated for an Ovation Award in the category Best Playwriting for an Original Play.

Bronzeville was also nominated for four NAACP Theater Awards: Toyama and Woolfolk for Best Playwright, Guillory for Best Director, the cast for Best Ensemble Cast, and Luke Moyer for Best Lighting, for which he won.

== Characters (and their Original Cast Members) ==
- Hide "Henry" Tahara (Jeff Manabat)
- Jodie Goodwin (Dwain A. Perry)
- Alice Goodwin (Adenrele Ojo)
- Mama Janie (CeCe Antoinette)
- Felix Goodwin (Larry Powell)
- Jane "Princess" Goodwin (Candice Afia)
- Joseph Cardell "Tubby" Griffin (Robert Clements)
- Theodus "Hamp" Hampton (Landon H. Lewis, Jr.)
- June Bug (Anthony B. Phillips)
- Naoma Tahara (Dana Lee)
- FBI Agent Frank Morgan (Benjamin Fitch)
- Officer Smith (Darrell Phillip)
- FBI Agent Larry Powell (Darrell Phillip)
- Sam Teraoka (Michael Yama)

In the 2013 revival, all roles were reprised by the original cast members except for Alice Goodwin (now Kellie Dantzler), Felix Goodwin (now Aaron Jennings), Jane "Princess" Goodwin (now Iman Milner), FBI Agent Frank Morgan (now Mark L. Colbenson), and Sam Teraoka (now Vladimir Velasco). The character "June Bug" was edited out of the story.
