= Aaron Woolfolk =

American film director

- Born: 17 January 1969 (age 56); Oakland, California, U.S.
- Education: University of California, Berkeley (BA); Columbia University (MFA)

Aaron Woolfolk (born in Oakland, California) is an American film director, screenwriter, producer, and playwright. He shot his first feature film The Harimaya Bridge in Kōchi Prefecture, Japan and San Francisco. The film had a nationwide theatrical release in Japan in the summer of 2009, and had a limited independent release in the United States in 2010. His play Bronzeville, which he co-wrote, opened to critical acclaim in 2009 and has since enjoyed two successful revivals. His podcast dramas There's Something Going on With Sam and Renaissance Man were nominated for numerous awards in 2015 and 2016. Woolfolk was the recipient of an ABC Entertainment Talent Development Grant, and was later a Walt Disney Studios/ABC Entertainment Writing Fellow.

== Films ==
=== Short films ===
For his first film, the short Rage!, Woolfolk won a Directors Guild of America award. His short films Eki and Kuroi Hitsuji, both shot in rural Japan, won several awards, screened in international film festivals, and played on cable television. Woolfolk's short film, Nico's Sampaguita, centered around San Francisco's Fillmore Jazz District, also won a number of awards and screened in several film festivals.

=== Feature films ===
Woolfolk's feature directorial debut, The Harimaya Bridge, which starred Danny Glover, Ben Guillory, Saki Takaoka and Misa Shimizu, won a number of awards, including Best First Time Feature Director at the Pan African Film Festival. The San Francisco Examiner named it "one of the best films of the year," while the Los Angeles Times called it "powerful" and "a unique, complex, consciousness-raising accomplishment." The film was invited to screen at the Smithsonian Institution in Washington, DC. The film had a nationwide release in Japan and an independent release in the United States, and is also available on DVD and VOD via Netflix, Time Warner Cable, DirecTV, Xfinity, and Cinemanow.

== Plays ==
Woolfolk collaborated with fellow playwright Tim Toyama in writing Bronzeville. It was developed by The Robey Theatre Company, which produced it in association with The Los Angeles Theatre Center. Bronzeville had its world premiere on 17 April 2009 and enjoyed an extended, sold-out run. Woolfolk and Toyama received a nomination for an Ovation Award in the category Best Playwriting for an Original Play. They were also nominated for an NAACP Theater Award in the category Best Playwright.

== Podcasts ==
In 2015 Woolfolk started collaborating with Earbud Theater, a podcast anthology series that produces radio-like dramas in the vein of The Twilight Zone and The Outer Limits.

Woolfolk's first effort was the horror story "There's Something Going on With Sam", which he wrote and directed. The story deals with a mother and son who try to figure out why the once-friendly ghost living in their home has suddenly become cruel and vicious. It received three 2015 Audio Verse Awards nominations in the categories Best Writing of an Original, Long-Form, Standalone Production; Best Original, Long-Form, Standalone Drama; and Best Original, Long-Form, Standalone Production.

His second effort was the 2016 science fiction story "Renaissance Man", which he wrote and directed. The story concerns a struggling musician who discovers a secret that allows him to get everything he desires... at a price. It received a 2016 Audio Verse Awards nomination in the category Best Writing of an Original, Long-Form, Self-Contained Production.

In 2017 Woolfolk will direct his original story "Family Line".

== Other experiences ==
Woolfolk is a veteran of the Japan Exchange and Teaching Programme (JET). He taught junior high school English in Kōchi Prefecture, Japan.

Woolfolk has a deep background in music, having played violin for several years. He also played viola, piano, and flute. As a teenager he was a member of Berkeley Youth Orchestra and Young People's Symphony Orchestra. As a student at the University of California Berkeley he was a member of the University Symphony.

== Education ==
Woolfolk is a graduate of the University of California Berkeley, where he received bachelor's degrees in Ethnic Studies and Rhetoric. He later graduated from Columbia University, where he received a Master of Fine Arts degree in Film with an emphasis on directing.

== Filmography ==
- Rage! (short film, 1997) - Directors Guild of America best student filmmaker award
- Eki (short film, 1999)
- Kuroi Hitsuji (short film, 1999)
- The Harimaya Bridge (feature film, 2009)
- Nico's Sampaguita (short film, 2012)
