= Lindsay Jones =

Lindsay Jones may refer to:

- Lindsay Jones (actor), known for their work at Rooster Teeth Productions
- Lindsay Jones (composer), known for his work in film, theatre, and television
- Lindsay Jones (curler), see List of teams on the 2011–12 World Curling Tour
- Lindsay Jones (soccer), see New York Power
