= Robey Theatre Company =

American non-profit theatre group

- Formation: 1994
- Type: Theatre group
- Location(s): The LATC 514 S. Spring St. Los Angeles, California 90013
- Notable members: Ben Guillory Artistic Director and Co-Founder Danny Glover, Co-Founder; Don Cheadle, Trustee; Delroy Lindo, Trustee; Blair Underwood, Trustee
- Website: www.robeytheatrecompany.com

Robey Theatre Company is a Los Angeles-based non-profit theatre company.

== History ==
Robey Theatre Company was founded in 1994 by Danny Glover and Ben Guillory. It takes its name from the pioneering Black actor and activist, Paul Robeson. Robey's mission is to explore and develop relevant, provocative, and innovative new plays written about the Black American experience, as well as to reinterpret established works. The rich culture and history of Black people is a potent, beautiful, sometimes tragic but always inspiring and illuminating reality. Robey offers an environment to support the telling of these stories.

In 2006 Robey Theatre Company joined a multicultural consortium called the "Cultural Roundtable" at THE NEW LATC, created to bring multicultural theatre to audiences in the Los Angeles Theatre Center venues in downtown Los Angeles. Other performance groups belonging to the Cultural Roundtable include the Latino Theater Company, Playwrights' Arena, Culture Clash, Cedar Grove OnStage, American Indian Dance Theatre and the UCLA School of Theater Film and Television. Robey Theatre Company developed Bronzeville, with playwrights Tim Toyama and Aaron Woolfolk, presenting its world premiere in April 2009, in association with THE NEW LATC.

In 2019, the Robey Theatre Company was featured in Juney Smith's documentary The Robeson Effect which headlined at the San Francisco Black Film Festival and the Pan African Film Festival.

== Programs ==
- Playwrights' Lab - Develops new works by and about the Black Experience, relying on an experienced dramaturge, introducing new works through readings.
- Scene Workshop
- Educational Outreach / Jonas Salk Continuation School - Drama workshop for middle and high school aged "at-risk" youth.

== Productions ==
Robey Theatre Company has collaborated with East West Players, Greenway Arts Alliance, Center Theatre Group at the Kirk Douglas Theatre, Against Type Theatre Company and THE NEW LATC

- Souls on Fire by Patrick Sheane Duncan (1996)
- Bee-Luther-Hatchee by Thomas Gibbons (1999)
- Yohen by Philip Kan Gotanda (1999)
- For the Love of Freedom, Part I: Tousaint (The Soul) Rise and Revolution by Levy Lee Simon (2001)
- The Last Season by Christopher Moore (2001)
- For the Love of Freedom, Part II: Dessalines (The Heart) Blood and Liberation by Levy Lee Simon (2002)
- For the Love of Freedom, Part III: Christophe (The Spirit) Passion and Glory by Levy Lee Simon (2004)
- Permanent Collection by Tomas Gibbons (2005)
- Bronzeville by Tim Toyama and Aaron Woolfolk (2009)

== Awards ==
- 2001 NAACP Image Award, Costume Design, For the Love of Freedom, Part I: Toussaint (The Soul) Rise and Revolution
- 2002 Ovation Award nomination, Ensemble Cast, The Last Season
- 2002 Ovation Award nomination, Lighting Design, The Last Season
- 2003 Ovation Award nomination, World Premiere Play, For the Love of Freedom, Part II: Dessalines (The Heart) Blood and Liberation
- 2006 LA Weekly Theater Award nomination, Production Design, Permanent Collection
- 2006 LA Weekly Theater Award, Lighting Design (Ian Garrett), Permanent Collection
- 2006 LA Weekly Theater Award nomination, Set Design, Permanent Collection
- 2006 LA Weekly Theater Award nomination, Sound Design, Permanent Collection
