= Feeding the Dragon =

2018 one-woman play

- 1st edition cover
- Written by: Sharon Washington
- Characters: various
- Original language: English
- Genre: One-person show
- Setting: New York Public Library

Premiere
- Date premiered: October 22, 2016
- Place premiered: City Theatre, Pittsburgh

Feeding the Dragon is a one-woman play written and originally performed by Sharon Washington, an American actress and playwright. The play tells the story of Washington’s unusual childhood growing up inside the New York Public Library, where her father worked as a live-in custodian.

Feeding the Dragon had its world premiere at City Theatre in Pittsburgh, PA in October of 2016. The play was later premiered Off-Broadway at Primary Stages in March of 2018, in association with Jamie deRoy and Hartford Stage. All three productions starred Washington, and were directed by Maria Mileaf.

Feeding the Dragon was nominated for the Lucille Lortel Award for Outstanding Solo Show and the Outer Critics Circle Award for Outstanding Solo Performance. The play was subsequently published by Oberon Modern Plays and adapted as an Audible Original.

== Plot ==
Feeding the Dragon is an autobiographical one-woman play in which Sharon Washington recounts her childhood growing up in an apartment inside the St. Agnes branch of the New York Public Library. Framed as “a modern fairy tale about the little girl who lived in a library,” the play follows Washington’s experiences as an only child surrounded by books and family.

As a young girl, Washington spends her days and nights exploring the library before and after opening hours, treating it as her personal playground. She develops a love of reading and storytelling, nurtured by both her grandmother and her unrestricted access to literature. Her father works as the library’s custodian, responsible for maintaining the facility and tending to the coal furnace in the basement, which she imagines as a “dragon that must be fed.”

The play is structured by a series of episodic memories from childhood, including interactions with Washington’s parents, grandparents, and friends, as well as moments of play, discovery, and creativity within the library, As she grows older, the tone of her story shifts to reveal more complex family dynamics, specifically her father’s struggle with alcoholism. Washington’s story then expands beyond the library, visiting relatives in Queens, and traveling with her father to the American South, where she begins to understand broader social realities, including systemic racism and intergenerational trauma.

The play concludes by returning to the metaphor of the “dragon,” which comes to represent both the literal furnace in the library, as well as the personal struggles and triumphs of Washington’s family. Through storytelling, Washington reflects on themes of memory, forgiveness, and the formative power literature as “the little girl in the library.”

== Production History ==
=== Conception ===
In December of 2009, a feature article in The New York Times entitled "Stoking the Furnace, and a Love for Books," chronicled Washington's unique childhood growing up within the walls of the New York Public Library. Her mailbox was subsequently inundated with people "wanting to write her story." Washington ultimately opted to write her own story, which eventually took the form of a play.

=== City Theatre, Pittsburgh ===
Feeding the Dragon had its world premiere at City Theatre in Pittsburgh, Pennsylvania. The production ran from October 22nd - November 20th, 2016. Directed by Maria Mileaf, the creative team included Tony Ferrieri (scenic design), Stephanie Shaw (costumes), Ann G. Wrightson (lighting), and Lindsay Jones (sound).

=== Hartford Stage ===
Feeding the Dragon was subsequently produced by Hartford Stage in Hartford, Connecticut. Directed by Maria Mileaf, the creative team included Tony Ferrieri (scenic design), Toni-Leslie James (costumes), Ann G. Wrightson (lighting), and Lindsay Jones (sound).

=== Primary Stages ===
Feeding the Dragon made its Off-Broadway premiere with Primary Stages, in association with Jamie deRoy, Audible, and Hartford Stage, at the Cherry Lane Theatre. Directed by Maria Mileaf, the creative team included Tony Ferrieri (scenic design), Toni-Leslie James (costumes), Ann G. Wrightson (lighting), and Lindsay Jones (sound).

While developing the script, Washington was a 2017-18 Tow Foundation Playwright-in-Residence at Primary Stages.

== Reception ==
The Off-Broadway production of Feeding the Dragon received critical acclaim, holding a score of 82% on the review aggregator Show-Score. Pete Hempstead, in a review for TheaterMania praised the production, writing "Washington has a storyteller's gift for animating her tale with lively and distinct impersonations of people from her past, and her easygoing delivery has a way of making us feel like we're taking part in a story-time hour. That endearing aspect of the show makes Washington a pleasure to watch."

Laura Collins Hughes, in a review for The New York Times offered a more mixed review, noting "At its most affecting, it's a memoir of Washington's parents' perseverance and muted pain in a culture warped by racism... The show attempts — but, for an adult audience, doesn’t achieve — a tricky tonal balance between childish memories and poignant later realization... Washington slips nimbly in and out of characters, each voice and accent clearly defined... The surface of Washington's story is far less compelling than what's underneath, and this play doesn't delve deep enough."

David Barbour, in a review for Lighting & Sound America offered similar sentiments, stating "Feeding the Dragon consists of delightful reminiscences that bring to life NY in all its gritty midcentury glory... So entertaining are these stories, and so adept is Washington at telling them, with her warm personality and faultless timing, that it may take you some time to notice that Feeding the Dragon isn't headed anywhere... The absence of drama is apparent in the last quarter when the lack of urgency is rather keenly felt. Still, under the direction of Maria Mileaf, Washington is, for the most part, excellent company."

== Awards and nominations ==
Year	Associations	Category	Recipient	Result	Ref.
2018	Lucille Lortel Award	Outstanding Solo Show	Primary Stages	Nominated	
2018	Outer Critics Circle Award	Outstanding Solo Performance	Sharon Washington	Nominated	
2018	AUDELCO Award	Outstanding Solo Performance	Sharon Washington	Won	
2018	Audible	Top 100 Plays	Sharon Washington	Honored	
