= Bronzeville =

Bronzeville may refer to:

== Neighborhood ==
- Bronzeville, Chicago, Illinois
  - Black Metropolis-Bronzeville District, a historic district within the Bronzeville neighborhood
- King-Lincoln Bronzeville, a neighborhood in Columbus, Ohio
- Bronzeville, Milwaukee, Wisconsin
- Brownsville, Florida
- Brownsville, Escambia County, Florida

== Other ==
- Bronzeville (play), a 2009 play by Tim Toyama and Aaron Woolfolk
- Bronzeville (podcast), an audio drama by Larenz Tate and Laurence Fishburne
