= Avenue Theater =

Coordinates: 39°44′36″N 104°58′54″W

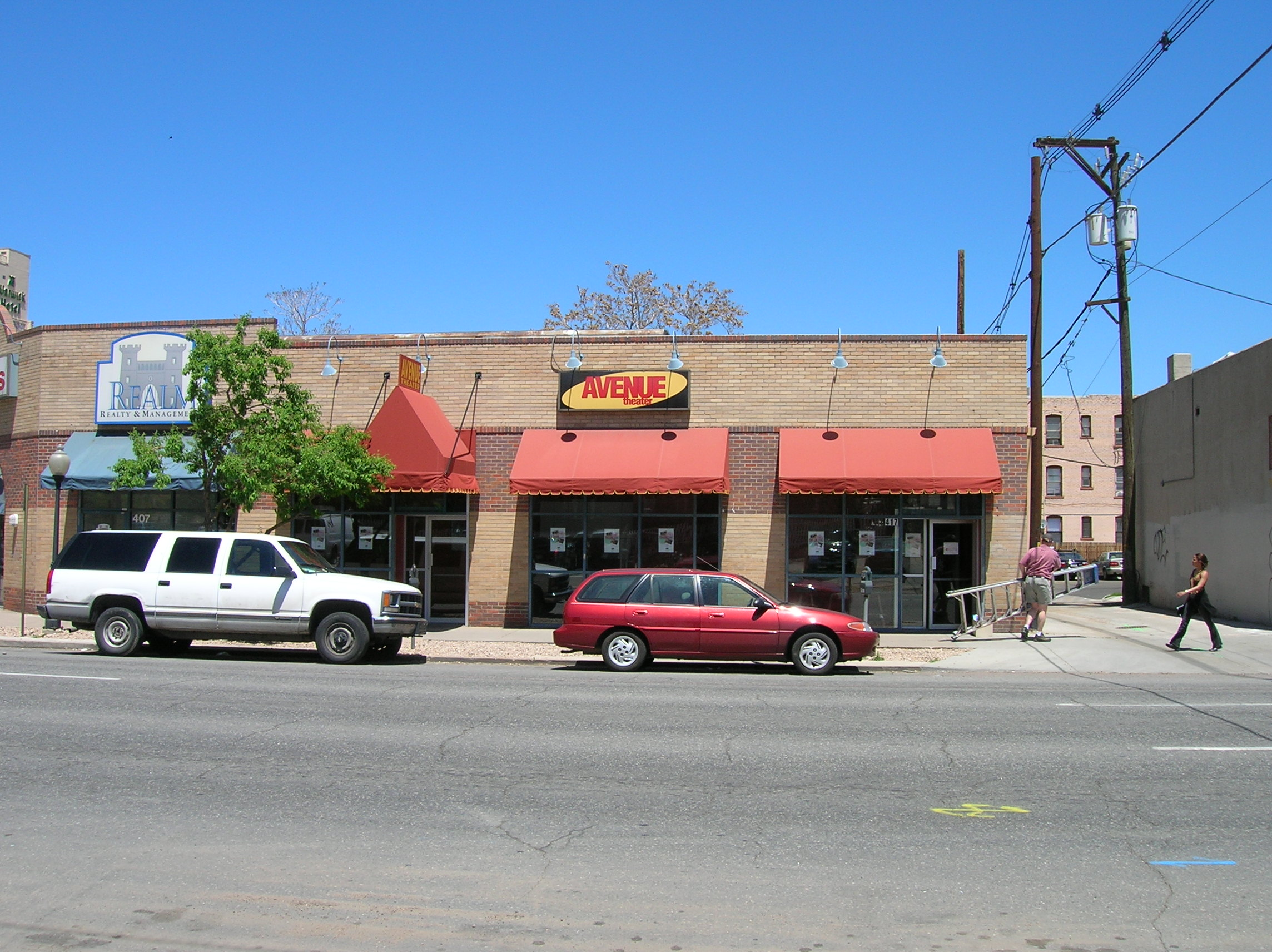
- The Avenue Theater in May, 2005

General information
- Address: 417 E 17th Avenue, Denver, CO, USA

Website
- www.avenuetheater.com

The Avenue Theater, located at 417 E. 17th Avenue in Downtown Denver, Colorado has been a producing comedies, musicals, and plays as well as improvisational comedy for 40 years. It is home to the World Humor Organization (WHO) and Chicken Lips Entertainment

== History ==
=== Early years ===
Robert Wells founded the Avenue Theater in 1985. At that time the theater was located at East 17th & Vine, 17 blocks east of the current location. Wells ran the theater for its first seven years.

=== Changing Hands ===
In 1992, John Ashton became the owner. He ran it for 9 years until, in 2001, the original Avenue Theater was closed. After its closing, Ashton spent the next two years finding a location and rebuilding the Avenue Theater. In spring of 2003, Ashton re-opened the Avenue Theater with business partner Robert Roehl.

In 2005, the pair sold the theater back to original owner Robert Wells and his business partner, Dave Johnson, who turned the theater into a non-profit, 501(c)(3). In 2011, they hired a new Director of Operations, Colin Elliott. Late in 2012, Johnson stepped down as executive director, and Nuri Heckler was appointed. These three, along with volunteers, interns, staff members, and artistic contributors, maintain the artistic mission of the theater.

== Radio Avenue ==
Every month, Wells and Johnson write a comical radio show entitled Radio Avenue. It is broadcast on KGNU on the first Monday of each month at 8:00 pm (Mountain Time) and is recorded the day before during a live performance at the Avenue. Because of its improv comedy nature, Radio Avenue is recorded live to a free audience.

== List of Shows ==
=== 2005 ===
- Parallel Lives
- The Rocky Horror Show
- The Fourth Wall
- The Syringa Tree
- Tribal Tales Of Africa
- Murder Most Fowl

=== 2006 ===
- The Smell of the Kill
- Destination Dinosaurs
- Beyond Therapy
- Tales Of An Englishman (Produced by A.C.E. Comedy)
- The A.C.E. Show (Co-produced by A.C.E. Comedy & Avenue Theater)
- Miscast (Produced by Next Stage Theatre Company)
- Some Unfortunate Hour (Produced by The Other Theatre Company)
- Denver Improv Festival (Produced by The GroupMind Foundation)
- BFE, The Town That Christmas Forgot (Co-produced by Rattlebrain Theater & Avenue Theater)
- Murder Most Fowl

=== 2007 ===
- Murder Most Fowl
- Destination Dinosaurs
- The Man Himself/Conviction (Co-produced by Ami Dayan & Avenue Theater)
- Right On America! (Produced by Elgin Kelley)
- Girls Only (Co-produced by A.C.E. Comedy & Avenue Theater)
- Ben Franklin (Produced by Venture West)
- Dog Sees God
- I Love You, You're Perfect, Now Change
- When Animals Improv
- The Bible: The Complete Word Of God (Abridged)
- Denver Improv Festival (Produced by The GroupMind Foundation)

=== 2008 ===
- Girls Only (Co-produced by A.C.E. Comedy & Avenue Theater)
- Oleanna
- Almost Denver: The Songs and Failures of Jim Aurora
- Free Gas: Chicken Lips Gives It To America

=== 2009 ===
- That Woman Show
- Vagina Monologues
- 60 Minutes: The Musical
- Die! Mommy Die!
- Santa's Big Red Sack
- What the Dickens?!

=== 2010 ===
- Secrets of a Soccer Mom
- The Booty Guard
- Hedwig and the Angry Inch
- The Love List
- VOX Phamalia: Triage
- Santa's Big Red Sack

=== 2011 ===
- The Goode Body
- The B-Team
- Hedwig and the Angry Inch
- Breach
- Completely Hollywood (Abridged)
- VOX Phamalia: Quadrapalooza
- Rattlebrain (Special Event, Original One-Man Sketch Comedy Show)
- Santa's Big Red Sack

=== 2012 ===
- Santa's Big Red Sack
- Scriptprov
- Murder Most Fowl
- Love Child
- Dave Shirley's Rattlebrain
- String of Pearls

== Awards ==
=== 2006 Denver Post Ovation Awards (6 Nominations, 2 Wins) ===
- Best Actor in a Children's Play: Chris Boeckx (Destination Dinosaurs) - WINNER
- Best Children's Play: Destination Dinosaurs
- Best Sound Design: Dave Johnson (Beyond Therapy)
- Best Actress in a Comic Role: Megan Van DeHay (The Smell of the Kill)
- Best Actor in a Comic Role: Kevin Hart (Beyond Therapy)
- Special Achievement Video Design: Brian Freeland (Destination Dinosaurs) - WINNER

=== 2006 Marlowe Awards (10 Wins) ===
- Best Production of a Play, Comedy: Beyond Therapy - WINNER
- Best Director, Comedy: Bob Wells (Beyond Therapy) - WINNER
- Best Actor, Comedy: Kevin Hart (Beyond Therapy) - WINNER
- Best Actress, Comedy: Megan Van DeHay (The Smell of the Kill) - WINNER
- Best Supporting Actor, Comedy: Josh Hartwell (Beyond Therapy) - WINNER
- Best Supporting Actress, Comedy: LuAnn Buckstein (Beyond Therapy) - WINNER
- Best Actor, Children's Show: Chris Boeckx (Destination Dinosaurs) - WINNER
- Best Children's Show: Destination Dinosaurs - WINNER
- Best Videography: Brian Freeland (Destination Dinosaurs) - WINNER
- Best New Musical: BFE: The Town Christmas Forgot - WINNER

== See also ==
- Radio Avenue
- Chicken Lips
- World Humor Organization
