= Before It Hits Home =

1991 play written by Cheryl West

- Written by: Cheryl West
- Characters: Wendal; Simone/MissPeterson; Douglass; Reba; Maybelle; Bailey; Dwayne; Nurse; Dr. Weinberg; Junior
- Subject: Middle-American family comes to grips with AIDS
- Genre: Drama

Premiere
- Date: January 1991
- Place: Arena Stage (1991); LuEster Hall (1992)

Before It Hits Home is a 1991 American play written by Cheryl West.

== Background ==
The show was originally workshopped by the Seattle Group Theatre at the Multicultural Playwrights Festival in 1989, then later was given a reading at the Circle Repertory Company in 1990.

== Productions ==
The original production opened in January 1991, at the Arena Stage, directed by Tazewell Thompson, set design Douglas Stein, lighting design Nancy Schertler, costume design Helen Qizhi Huang, and sound design Susan R. White. The cast starred Michael Jayce (Wendal), Cynthia Martells (Simone/Mrs. Peterson), Keith Randolph Smith (Douglas), Trazana Beverley (Reba), Mercedes Herrero (Nurse), Sandra Reaves-Phillips (Maybelle), Julian Hughes (Doctor), Wally Taylor (Bailey), Ryan Richmond (Dwayne), and Lee Simon Jr. (Junior).

The production then had its Off-Broadway premiere at LuEster Hall in February 1992, directed by Thompson, set design Loy Arcenas, costume design Paul Tazewell, lighting design Schertler, and sound design White. The cast starred James McDaniel (Wendal), Sharon Washington (Simone/Mrs. Peterson), Smith (Douglass), Yvette Hawkins (Reba), Marcella Lowery (Maybelle), Frankie Faison (Bailey), James Jason Lilley (Dwayne), Carol Honda (Nurse), Beth Dixon (Dr. Weinberg), and Monti Sharp (Junior).

== Reviews ==
Frank Rich of The New York Times said the show has "validity and brute force" and that it's "authentic, at times almost hysterical wake-up call to the black community, sounded from within."

== Awards and nominations ==
Year	Award	Category	Nominee	Result
1991	Susan Smith Blackburn Prize	Susan Smith Blackburn Prize	Cheryl West	Won
1992	Obie Award	Obie Award for Distinguished Performance by an Actor	James McDaniel	Won
