= Radio Avenue =

- Genre: Comedy
- Running time: 60 mins
- Country of origin: United States
- Language: English
- Home station: KGNU
- Starring: Bob Wells; Dave Johnson; Jared Ewy
- Recording studio: Avenue Theater
- Original release: Present
- Website: www.radioavenue.org
- Podcast: Radio Avenue Podcast

Radio Avenue is an American radio comedy broadcast on Denver's KGNU. It is presented by Dave Johnson and Bob Wells, joint owners of the Avenue Theater and Chicken Lips comedy company, with additional comments provided by Jared Ewy.

It is broadcast on the first Monday of each month at 8:00 pm (Mountain Time) and is recorded during a live performance at the Avenue Theater in Downtown Denver. Because of its improv comedy nature, Radio Avenue is recorded live to a free audience.

Featured artists include Dale Allen Robertson, Barbara J., and Paul Vens.
