= Keith Randolph Smith =

American actor

- Other name: Keith Smith
- Occupation: Actor
- Years active: 1986–present

Keith Randolph Smith is an American Broadway, television, theater, and film actor.

Smith appeared in the films Malcolm X and Girl 6, both films directed by Spike Lee, and played Will in Fallout and Jesse Hill in Backstreet Justice.

His TV credits include Law & Order, Cosby, New York Undercover, and Onion SportsDome.

Smith has worked extensively in the theater, and his Broadway credits include Fences, Come Back, Little Sheba, King Hedley II, The Piano Lesson, and Salome.

Off-Broadway credits include Fabulation (Playwrights Horizons), Jitney (Second Stage), Holiday Heart (Manhattan Theatre Club), Before It Hits Home (NYSF) and Auturo Ui (Classic Stage Company). Regionally, he has acted in God of Carnage (Atlanta's Alliance Theatre), The Dreams of Sarah Breedlove (Alabama Shakespeare), In Walks Ed (Long Wharf), Les Trois Dumas (Indiana Rep), Tartuffe (Hartford Stage), and The Heliotrope Bouquet (La Jolla Playhouse).

In 2001, Smith starred in the international tour of the August Wilson play Jitney, which opened at the National Theatre in London.

Smith is the voice of Clay Simons, the Lost's Road Captain, in the video game Grand Theft Auto: The Lost and Damned and as the Crowd of Liberty City and the Vibe 98.8 Imaging, in the video game Grand Theft Auto IV. Smith reprised his role as Clay in Grand Theft Auto V.

In 2012, Smith performed in the Virginia Stage Company (VSC) production of the August Wilson drama Fences, which originally starred James Earl Jones on the Great White Way. In reviewing Smith's performance, Mal Vincent of The Virginian-Pilot wrote, "Smith is better than James Earl Jones was in originating the role on Broadway in 1987."

Keith Randolph Smith trained at the American Academy of Dramatic Arts in New York City, United States, graduating in 1986.
