= Deadtectives =

- Directed by: Tony West
- Written by: Tony West; David Clayton Rogers; Mark Riley; Cris Rice
- Starring: Chris Geere; David Newman; José María de Tavira; Martha Higareda; Emilio Savinni
- Cinematography: Andre Lascaris
- Edited by: Nicole West
- Music by: Mark Sayfritz
- Production companies: Bad Idea; Dark Factory Entertainment
- Distributed by: Planeta Inform (Russia); Shudder (USA)
- Release date: October 5, 2018 (Sitges Film Festival)
- Running time: 92 minutes
- Country: United States
- Language: English

Deadtectives is a 2018 comedy horror film that was directed by Tony West, who co-wrote the film's script with David Clayton Rogers. The film had its world premiere on October 5, 2018 at the Sitges Film Festival and was released in the United States and Russia in 2019 on Shudder and Planeta Inform, respectively.

== Synopsis ==
The film follows a group of reality show ghost hunters, Sam and Javier, who have chosen to investigate Mexico's most haunted house in hopes of securing better ratings for their failing show Deadtectives. They are accompanied by Sam's wife and the show's producer Kate and Sam's awkward brother Lloyd. While Sam and Javier give off the impression that they truly believe and have experienced the paranormal, none of the events shown thus far in their series were actually real and were all the result of their special effects person Bob, who is also accompanying them on the trip. Lloyd is the only one in the group who actually believes that ghosts are real.

Once inside the home Bob sets up various special effects, however the team soon discovers that the home is truly haunted, particularly after an angry spirit kills Javier, the only Spanish speaking member of the team. Attempts to leave the home are unsuccessful and the remaining team members find that they are truly trapped. Now dead, Javier discovers that aside from himself, the home is only haunted by four Spanish-speaking ghosts: a mother, her two children, and her tyrannical husband, who is insistent on keeping his family from moving on and is now intent on murdering the rest of the home's living inhabitants. Javier witnesses the murder of Bob and sees him pass into a brilliant white light, something he himself had experienced when he died but chose not to walk into. Attempts to communicate with his teammates are initially unsuccessful until one of Lloyd's inventions gives them the ability to see Javier, at which point they use various other apparatus to communicate and plan on how to beat the ghost husband. Their attempts are initially unsuccessful until the wife chooses to finally fight back against her husband, which allows them to gain the upper hand and destroy his spirit. Now finally free from the oppressive spirit, the mother and her children walk into a brilliant white light that has appeared for them. Before walking into it himself Javier takes the opportunity to say goodbye to his team, but takes so long that the light fades away without him. Now stuck in the land of the living, Javier, Sam, Kate, and Lloyd decide to take on real hauntings in other locations in order to find the truth and bring peace to suffering spirits.

== Cast ==
- Chris Geere as Sam Whitner
- David Newman as Lloyd
- José María de Tavira as Javier
- Martha Higareda as Abril
- Emilio Savinni as Ghost Father
- Mark Riley as Bob
- Valentina Zertuche as Ghost Girl
- Matías del Castillo as Ghost Boy
- Nuria Blanco as Dead Mother
- Cris Rice as Konrad
- Milleth Gómez as Mrs. Sánchez Bello
- Raúl Aranda-Lee as Mrs. Sánchez Bello
- Cecelia Antoinette as Ethel
- Maria Cargutié as Zoey

== Release ==
Deadtectives had its world debut at the Sitges Film Festival on October 5, 2018. The following year the movie was released to the streaming services Planeta Inform in Russia and Shudder in the United States.

== Reception ==
Bloody Disgusting rated Deadtectives at 5/5 skulls, praising the film's visuals, laughs, and stating that "There’s not a single beat that doesn’t work in this hilarious, spooky film, and that’s a rarity, indeed." Birth.Movies.Death. was more critical in their review, writing that "Unfortunately, Deadtectives immediately settles into a hyperactive tone that constantly grates nerves. It’s not just that the film is unfunny, it is unfunny at an extremely high volume."
