= Tazewell Thompson =

American dramatist

Tazewell Thompson is an American theatre director, the former artistic director of the Westport Country Playhouse (2006–07) in Westport, Connecticut and the Syracuse Stage (1992–95) in New York state. Prior to that he was an assistant director at Arena Stage in Washington, D.C. He is the Director of Opera Studies at Manhattan School of Music.

Thompson has directed numerous independent productions, and since 2000, when he directed his first opera, Porgy and Bess for the New York City Opera, has been called on to direct more operas and musicals. His success led to invitations to direct productions of Francis Poulenc's Dialogues of the Carmelites for the Glimmerglass Opera and City Opera in 2002 and 2004, respectively, as well as other works. Thompson was nominated for an Emmy in 2006 as Best Director for the televised production of his Porgy and Bess produced at Arena Stage in Washington, DC. In August 2012, he directed Maxwell Anderson and Kurt Weill's Lost in the Stars (1949) for Glimmerglass Opera, a musical based on the South African classic novel Cry, the Beloved Country by Alan Paton.

As a playwright, Thompson has also received recognition, with numerous productions of his Constant Star (2002) about the activist Ida B. Wells. His play, Mary T. & Lizzy K., about Mary Todd Lincoln and Elizabeth Keckley, premiered in Washington, D.C., at Arena Stage in 2013. Jubilee, an a cappella musical that he wrote and directed based on the Fisk Jubilee Singers of Fisk University, also had its premiere at Arena Stage, in 2019.

== Early life and education ==
Tazewell Thompson was born in New York City. His childhood was difficult as his father, a jazz musician, frequently traveled. His mother had emotional problems and, after a fire in their apartment in which his three-year-old brother died, she grew unable to care for him. When Tazewell was eight, his paternal grandmother intervened to help him, placing him in a home run by the Sisters of St. Dominic in Blauvelt, New York. He lived with them for six years, and received the initiatory sacraments of the Catholic Church. He has fond memories of the sisters who encouraged his interest in theatre. He drew on his experiences years later in directing Poulenc's opera Dialogues of the Carmelites.

== Career ==
As an actor, Thompson was a cast member of the original Broadway productions of The National Health (1974) and Checking Out (1976). He acted in numerous Off-Off-Broadway pop art plays by Rosalyn Drexler.

== Theatre direction ==
In New York, Thompson taught at St. Ann's School and mounted ambitious productions with its students, including Stephen Sondheim's Follies and Phèdre (in French). He continued his independent acting and direction as well.

His direction of a revival of Aaron Copland's opera The Second Hurricane at the Henry Street Settlement gained him attention. Zelda Fichandler, director and co-founder of the Arena Stage in Washington, DC, invited him to work with her as an assistant director. While in Washington, Thompson discovered and directed early work of playwright Cheryl West, beginning with Before It Hits Home.

When selected in 1992 as the artistic director of Syracuse Stage, Thompson became one of a handful of black directors to head a regional theatre, including Kenny Leon of the Alliance Theatre in Atlanta, George C. Wolfe at the New York Shakespeare Festival, and Lloyd Richards, the longtime artistic director of the Yale Repertory Theater. He regularly informally greeted the audience after the plays and, early in his tenure, assured subscribers he intended to make the theatre's repertory more inclusive. His first season he produced, Jar the Floor, by Cheryl L. West, which proved to be one of the most popular productions.

In June 2005, Thompson was selected as artistic director at the Westport Country Playhouse in Westport, Connecticut, serving through the 2007 season.

Thompson has also done freelance directing. In 2000, he directed Porgy and Bess for the New York City Opera. In 2002, he directed Francis Poulenc's Dialogues of the Carmelites for the Glimmerglass Opera and in 2004 for the City Opera. In the summer of 2004 he directed Gilbert and Sullivan's Patience at Glimmerglass. He did Benjamin Britten's Death in Venice for them in the summer of 2005. In May 2006, he directed Porgy and Bess in Washington, DC. In August 2012, he directed Maxwell Anderson and Kurt Weill's Lost in the Stars (1949) for Glimmerglass Opera, a musical based on Alan Paton's 1948 novel Cry, the Beloved Country (1948).

In July 2019, he directed Jeanine Tesori's new opera Blue for which he had also written the libretto, at Glimmerglass. The opera picks up the issue of African-American teenage boys having become a prime target of police brutality in the United States.

== Playwright ==
Thompson has written and directed several plays, including Constant Star (2002), a musical drama about the life of the 19th-century activist and journalist Ida B. Wells, first produced in Pittsburgh, Pennsylvania, at City Theatre. It uses five actresses to play Wells, who also portray other figures in her life. Although primarily a drama, it includes about 20 negro spirituals sung by the actresses and used as transitions. The play has toured the United States.

Thompson said of his play:

My first introduction to Ida B. Wells was the PBS documentary on her life. Her story gnawed at me. A woman born in slavery, she would grow to become one of the great pioneer activists of the Civil Rights Movement. A precursor of Rosa Parks, she was a suffragist, newspaper editor and publisher, investigative journalist, co-founder of the NAACP, political candidate, mother, wife, and the single most powerful leader in the anti-lynching campaign in America. A dynamic, controversial, temperamental, uncompromising race woman, she broke bread and crossed swords with some of the movers and shakers of her time: Frederick Douglass, Susan B. Anthony, Marcus Garvey, Booker T. Washington, W. E. B. Du Bois, President McKinley. By any fair assessment, she was a seminal figure in Post-Reconstruction America.

- Mary T. & Lizzy K. (2013), his play about Mary Todd Lincoln and Elizabeth Keckley, a former slave who was a modiste and friend of Lincoln, opened in March 2013 at the Mead Center for American Theater in Washington, DC.

== Legacy and honors ==
- 2006, Thompson won an NAACP Theatre Award for Director of a Musical for his production of Porgy and Bess.
- 2006, he was nominated for an Emmy as Best Director for the televised production of his Porgy and Bess.

== Other sources ==
- Frank Rizzo, "Thompson in at Westport: Artistic director to begin new role Jan. 1", Variety, June 21, 2005
