= Mechanical Violator Hakaider =

1995 Japanese film

- DVD cover art

Japanese name
- Kanji: 人造人間ハカイダー
Transcriptions
- Revised Hepburn: Jinzō Ningen Hakaidā
- Directed by: Keita Amemiya
- Screenplay by: Toshiki Inoue
- Based on: Android Kikaider by Shotaro Ishinomori
- Produced by: Susumu Yoshikawa; Shinichiro Shirakura; Tatsuya Kimura; Toru Uemura; Haruki Nakayama
- Starring: Yuji Kishimoto; Mai Hosho; Yasuaki Honda; Dai Matsumoto; Kazuhiko Inoue
- Cinematography: Fumio Matsumura
- Edited by: Jyunkichi Sugano
- Music by: Koichi Ota; Shinji Kinoshita
- Production companies: Toei Company; Toei Video; Tohokushinsha Film; Sega
- Distributed by: Toei Company
- Release date: April 15, 1995
- Running time: 51 minutes (theatrical); 77 minutes (director's cut)
- Country: Japan
- Language: Japanese

Mechanical Violator Hakaider (人造人間ハカイダー, Jinzō Ningen Hakaidā; lit. “Android Hakaider”) is a 1995 Japanese tokusatsu film directed by Keita Amemiya. Based on the television series Android Kikaider, the film features Hakaider in the role of an anti-hero as opposed to his typical portrayal as a villain.

== Production ==
Mechanical Violator Hakaider was released in Japan on April 15, 1995. It was produced by Toei Company alongside Tohokushinsha Film and Sega. The film was directed by Keita Amemiya. The title character was an antagonist from the original Kikaider series.

== Plot ==
A gang of criminals break into an abandoned prison in search of treasure and find what appears to be a man in chains. They accidentally awaken the man, who reveals himself to be the android Hakaider. He kills them all, and ponders his own identity among the wreckage. Hakaider escapes on a motorcycle. Elsewhere, a man cornered by security officers attempts suicide, but is stopped and captured by an angelic android named Michael.

Hakaider arrives at Jesus Town, a pseudo-utopia built on what was once Jerusalem. Having no identification, Hakaider is stopped by a border guard, but ignores him and breaks through the electric barrier. Meanwhile, a band of rebels in Jesus Town stages an attack on the town's heavily armed security force, stealing weapons in order to subjugate the government.

Gurjev, Jesus Town's seraphim ruler, recognizes Hakaider and sends his security force to destroy him. He explains to Michael, now revealed to be his head of security, that Hakaider was Michael's failed predecessor, who rebelled due to his belief in free will over forced peace. The security officers confront Hakaider, but he dispatches them with ease as the rebels look on. Kaoru, one of the rebels, recognizes Hakaider from her dreams, as the knight in shining armor saving her from oppression. When Hakaider is knocked unconscious, the rebels attack the security officers and take the android back to their base.

Hakaider awakens in the rebels' base, where Kaoru demonstrates a romantic interest in him. The group reveals that Jesus Town's apparent peace is due to the government's practice of capturing dissenters and lobotomizing them, removing their free will - among the victims is the man Michael captured. They explain their intentions to overthrow Gurjev's government, but Hakaider expresses distrust of their motives.

The security force finds the rebels' hideout, initiating a shootout in which most of the rebels are killed. Kaoru and Arnie, another surviving rebel escape the hideout in time to see the security officers apparently kill Hakaider with a rocket launcher. The officers leave, shooting Kaoru and Arnie on their way out. As the wounded Kaoru swears at the security officers, Michael arrives and severely wounds her. Her scream reawakens Hakaider.

Kaoru wanders through the streets of Jesus Town, declaring the citizens guilty for Hakaider's death and their own oppression due to their refusal to fight back. Hakaider finds her in the crowd, revealing himself to have survived. She takes him to her "secret spot," the last oasis remaining in the city. She admits her feelings towards Hakaider, and, dreaming of riding off into the sunset with him, dies peacefully.

Hakaider takes Kaoru's charm and rides back into the city, attacking the government building and wiping out the security force with one blow. Coming across a group of citizens scheduled for lobotomy, he asks whether they have free will; When they answer yes, he frees them and confronts Michael. As they fight, Michael proclaims the importance of order over free will, calling this "justice". Hakaider declares that, if that is justice, then he will be evil. Michael gains the upper hand, but Hakaider surprises him with a concealed weapon and decapitates him.

Gurjev pretends to reason with Hakaider while buying time for Michael's head to be integrated into a large tank, altering the head to be red and blue in color and asymmetrical. In his new form, Michael attacks Hakaider, who manages to subdue him once more with yet another concealed weapon. Hakaider returns to confront Gurjev, who desperately attempts to shoot Hakaider with a revolver, to no avail. The android decides he is not worth killing. As Hakaider turns to leave, Gurjev attempts to once more to ambush him with the discarded Hakaider Shot, but Hakaider sees it coming and kills him in a cloud of feathers. With Gurjev dead, and Michael's consciousness quickly fading away, Hakaider departs on his motorcycle.

== Cast ==
- Ryo (リョウ, Ryō) - Yuji Kishimoto (岸本 祐二, Kishimoto Yūji)
- Kaoru (カオル, Kaoru) - Mai Hosho (宝生 舞, Hōshō Mai)
- Cap (キャップ, Kyappu) - Satoshi Kurihara (栗原 敏, Kurihara Satoshi)
- Ami (アミ, Ami) - Ami Kawai (河合 亞美, Kawai Ami) (Played as "河合 亜美")
- Kiyo (キヨ, Kiyo) - Kiyohiko Inoue (井上 清彦, Inoue Kiyohiko)
- Andy (アンディ, Andi) - Andy Smith (アンディ・スミス, Andi Sumisu)
- Eddie (エディ, Eddi) - Eddie Lawrence (エディ・ローレンス, Eddi Rōrensu)
- Rauf (ラウフ, Raufu) - Rauf Ahmed (ラウフ・アーメッド, Raufu Āmeddo)
- Criminal (犯罪者, Hanzaisha) - Toshimichi Takahashi (高橋 利道, Takahashi Toshimichi)
- Checkpoint Official (検問所係員, Kenmonjo Kakariin) - Ed Sardi (エド・サーディ, Eddo Sādi)
- Commander of Heavy Armored Soldier (重武装兵隊長, Jūbusōhei Taichō) - Riichi Seike (清家 利一, Seike Riichi)
- Burglars (盗掘者, Tōkutsusha) - Makoto Yokoyama (横山 誠, Yokoyama Makoto), Akira Ohashi (大橋 明, Ōhashi Akira), Kazuhiro Yokoyama (横山 和博, Yokoyama Kazuhiro), and Mitsuo Abe (阿部 光男, Abe Mitsuo)
- Boy (少年, Shōnen) - Shohei Shibata (柴田 翔平, Shibata Shōhei)
- Man in Brain Processing Room (頭脳処理室の男, Zunō Shorishitsu no Otoko) - Yukijiro Hotaru (螢 雪次朗, Hotaru Yukijirō)
- Gurjev (グルジェフ, Gurujefu) - Yasuaki Honda (本田 恭章, Honda Yasuaki)
- Hakaider (ハカイダー, Hakaidā; Voice) - Dai Matsumoto (松本 大, Matsumoto Dai)
- Michael (ミカエル, Mikaeru; Voice) - Kazuhiko Inoue (井上 和彦, Inoue Kazuhiko)

== Songs ==
- WILD SIDE
  - Lyrics: Makoto Asakura
  - Composition & Arrangement: Daisuke Asakura
  - Artist: MODE
- Turn your Memories into a Bouquet of Flowers (想い出を花束にかえて, Omoide Wo Hanataba Ni Kaete)
  - Lyrics & Composer: KYOKO (Kyoko Kimura)
  - Arranger: Makoto Kawabe (Shin Kawabe)
  - Artist: Kyoko Sound Laboratory
- Until We Meet Again (もう一度めぐり会う日まで, Mouichido Meguriau Hi Made)
  - Lyrics & Composer: KYOKO (Kyoko Kimura)
  - Arranger: Makato Kawabe (Shin Kawabe)
  - Artist: Kyoko Sound Laboratory

== Video game ==
A game based on the film called Mechanical Violator Hakaider: The Last Judgement was released for the Sega Saturn exclusively in Japan on December 27, 1996. It is a light-gun shooting game where the player controls Hakaider using the Hakaider Shot. The game also incorporates adventure game elements.

Taking place 10 years after the original film's events, Hakaider, after refusing follow Professor Gil's orders, loses his right hand from an attack by Waruder. Using a spare right arm, Hakaider heads back to Jesus Town in order to retrieve his original arm and defeat Gil.

Michael and Gurjev return in the game as boss characters, while some characters from the original Kikaider and Kikaider 01 series appear, such as Professor Gil, Waruder, and Bijinder. Hakaider and Michael are voiced by the same actors from the film. Gurjev, instead, is voiced by Shinichiro Miki. Takeshi Watabe, who voices Waruder in Kikaider 01, reprises his role in this game.
