= Tatsuya Kimura =

Japanese film producer and critic

- Born: 29 June 1964 (age 62); Kyoto, Kyoto Prefecture, Japan
- Occupations: Film producer, Critic and Music Producer

Tatsuya Kimura (木村 立哉, Kimura Tatsuya; born 1964 in Kyoto, Kyoto Prefecture, Japan) is a Japanese film producer and a critic, and also as known as Hockney Katsushika (葛飾 ホックニー, Katsushika Hockney), a music producer.

== Biography ==
Tatsuya Kimura was born in 1964 in Kyoto, Kyoto Prefecture, Japan. Debuted as a critic in his high school days. He graduated Waseda University in Tokyo in 1987.

In 1993, he joined in and wrote for Cahiers du cinéma Japon with Shinji Aoyama, Kiyoshi Kurosawa and Makoto Shinozaki. During 2003 - 2007, he nominated newcomers for Kido Award and found new scenarists, Ryō Wada, Tomonori Ozaki and Sachiko Tanaka (later, a writer for Kiyoshi Kurosawa's Tokyo Sonata). He worked for The 49th Asia Pacific Film Festival as a director in 2004. In December 2005, Jury for The 9th Scenario Award in Hakodate Port Illumination Film Festival 2005, with Yoichi Sai, George Iida and Hiroshi Aramata. In February 2006, he acted with his friends and artists like Ay-O, Genpei Akasegawa and Ryuichi Sakamoto in Museum of Contemporary Art, Tokyo for the first event in the world for Nam June Paik's death.

== Selected filmography ==
- The Hitman: Blood Smells Like Roses (ザ・ヒットマン 血はバラの匂い, 1991) as an assistant director
- J movie wars: Tsuki wa dotchi ni dete iru (月はどっちに出ている, 1993) - Japanese Professional Movie Award 1994
- Mechanical Violator Hakaider (人造人間ハカイダー, 1995)
- Blooming Again (死に花, 2004)
- Taitei no Ken (大帝の剣, 2007)
- God's Puzzle (神様のパズル, 2008)
- The Harimaya Bridge (The Harimaya Bridge はりまや橋, 2009)
- Boku to mama no kiiroi jitensha (ぼくとママの黄色い自転車, 2009)
