= Cecelia Antoinette =

American actress (1949–2020)

- Cecelia Antoinette, from a 2004 publication.
- Born: Cecelia Antoinette Bruton; November 24, 1949; Dallas, Texas
- Died: May 28, 2020 (aged 70)
- Other names: CeCe Antoinette, Cecilia Antoinette
- Occupations: Actress, comedian, writer

Cecelia Antoinette Bruton (November 24, 1949 – May 28, 2020), known professionally as Cecelia Antoinette or CeCe Antoinette, was an American actress, comedian, and writer.

== Early life ==
Cecelia Antoinette Bruton was born a twin in Dallas, in 1949, the daughter of Cicero Hamilton Bruton Sr. and Naomi Hartman Bruton. Her mother was an actress, and her father worked for the railroad. She was educated in Hamilton Park schools, graduating from high school in 1968. She earned a bachelor's degree at the University of Oklahoma. She was a member of Alpha Kappa Alpha.

== Career ==
Bruton began acting in Dallas and took acting classes in New York City. She appeared on Broadway in Mule Bone, and in touring or regional companies of The Wake of Jeremy Foster, The Member of the Wedding, The Ride Down Mt. Morgan, St. Lucy's Eyes, and Bronzeville. On television, she had small roles in Law & Order: Special Victims Unit, Scrubs, Weeds, The Marvelous Mrs. Maisel, Godfather of Harlem, The Punisher, A Black Lady Sketch Show, Blue Bloods, 2 Broke Girls, Mad Men, Desperate Housewives, Girlfriends, Crossing Jordan, and The Chris Rock Show. Her film credits included appearances in After School (2008), Proud American (2008), Yes Man (2008), Dance Fu (2011), Different Flowers (2017), and Deadtectives (2018).

Bruton published a book of poetry, Just as I am, and a memoir, Brown Gal's Rising, and an autobiographical one-woman show, Watermelon: Git It While It's Hot!. She participated in the Lincoln Center Theater Directors Lab in 1998, and performed at festivals about women in jazz in Hartford in 1999 and 2001. She was a member of the Women's Project Directors Forum. She taught theatre at various levels, including at the Pennsylvania State University and the New York City public schools.

== Personal life ==
Cecelia Antoinette Bruton was a practicing Nichiren Shoshu Buddhist.

== Death ==
She died in 2020, aged 70 years. She was honored posthumously at the Reel Sisters awards ceremony in November 2020.
