= James McDaniel =

American actor (born 1958)

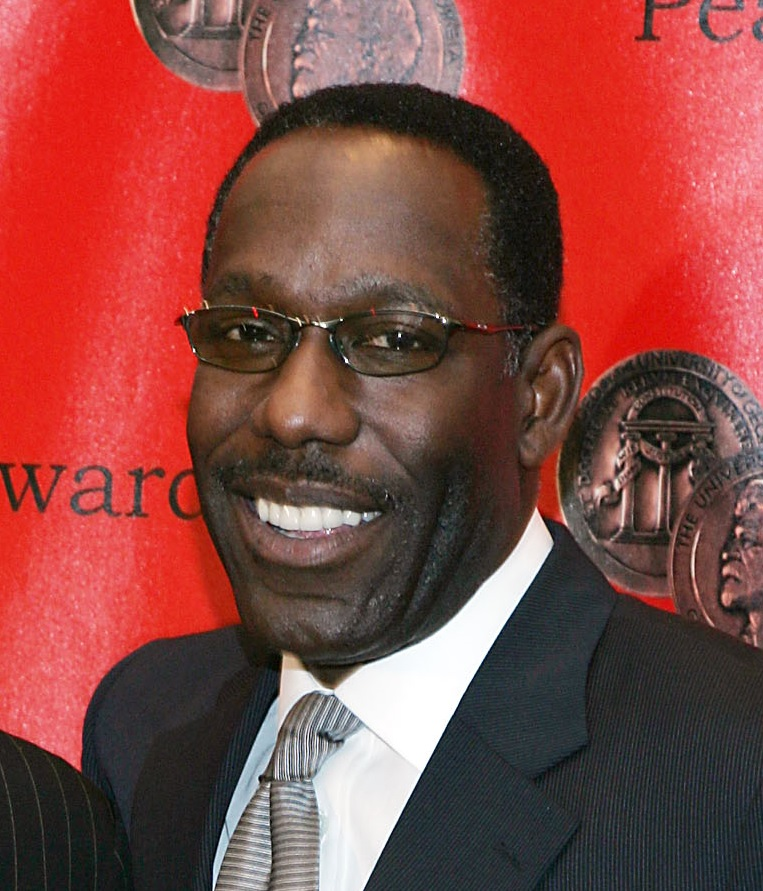
- McDaniel at the 65th Annual Peabody Awards
- Born: James McDaniel Jr. March 25, 1958 (age 68); Washington, D.C., U.S.
- Occupation: Actor
- Years active: 1982–present
- Spouse: Hannelore McDaniel (?–present)
- Children: 2

James McDaniel Jr. (born March 25, 1958) is an American stage, film and television actor. He is best known for playing Lt. Arthur Fancy on the television show NYPD Blue. He played the role of Paul in the hit Lincoln Center play Six Degrees of Separation. He played a police officer in the ill-fated 1990 series Cop Rock, and a close advisor to the director Spike Lee regarding the activist Malcolm X in the 1992 film Malcolm X. He also played Sgt. Jesse Longford in the ABC television series Detroit 1-8-7.

== Early life ==
James McDaniel Jr. was born in Washington, D.C., on March 25, 1958, the son of physician James McDaniel Sr. The junior McDaniel attended the University of Pennsylvania, where he studied veterinary medicine. After taking his final exams, he decided to move to New York and become an actor, despite having no prior acting experience. McDaniel enrolled in dance and voice lessons, and earned his first role in a Pepsi commercial.

== Career ==
McDaniel began acting on the stage. He appeared in the original production of Six Degrees of Separation as Paul Poitier, and received the Clarence Derwent Award for his performance. McDaniel originated the role of Adam in Someone Who'll Watch Over Me, being the only American in the cast. He received an Obie Award after performing in Before It Hits Home.

Early roles on television include guest appearances on sitcom Kate & Allie and crime drama Gabriel's Fire. He portrayed police officer Franklin Rose on the short-lived and poorly received series Cop Rock. McDaniel had a minor role in the Woody Allen film Alice (1990), was a banker in Strictly Business (1991) and portrayed Brother Earl in Spike Lee's Malcolm X (1992).

McDaniel guest starred as a cop on Hill Street Blues, created by Steven Bochco. Thereafter, he appeared often in productions with Bochco's involvement, including L.A. Law and Civil Wars. He played Lt. Arthur Fancy on NYPD Blue for eight seasons, between 1993 and 2001. The series attracted some criticism regarding McDaniel being underutilized during his time on the show. McDaniel himself alluded to this, claiming to be "the highest paid extra on television." He was nominated for a Primetime Emmy Award for Outstanding Supporting Actor in a Drama Series in 1996 for his work on the series. He also received three consecutive NAACP Image Award nominations for Outstanding Supporting Actor in a Drama Series.

He portrayed the role of Sgt. Jesse Longford in crime drama Detroit 1-8-7. McDaniel appeared as an investigator in The Following and was Ezra Mills, Abbie's father, in Sleepy Hollow. McDaniel made a guest appearance as a jazz trumpeter in NCIS: New Orleans. McDaniel appeared in Tamara Tunie's See You in September (2010) and in the Jordana Spiro film Night Comes On (2018).

McDaniel has also appeared extensively in television films, namely Silencing Mary (1996), Unforgivable (1996), and Out of Time (2000), the latter in a rare role as the main character. He portrayed Nat King Cole in Livin' for Love: The Natalie Cole Story (2000). Natalie Cole personally handpicked McDaniel to play her father.

== Personal life ==
With his wife Hannelore, McDaniel has two children.

== Filmography ==
=== Film ===
Year	Title	Role	Notes
1983	Banzaï	Bronx Guy	Uncredited
1988	Rocket Gibraltar	Policeman	
1990	Alice	Party Guest	
1991	Strictly Business	Roland Halloran	
1992	Malcolm X	Brother Earl	
1994	Heading Home		
1997	Truth or Consequences, N.M.	Frank Thompson	
2002	Sunshine State	Reggie Perry	
2006	El Cortez	Arnie	
2006	Steel City	Randall Karn	
2007	War Eagle, Arkansas	Jack	
2008	Butterfly Dreaming	Dr. Timothy Baldrica	
2008	Bunker Hill	Peter Salem	
2010	See You in September	Lewis	
2012	You're Nobody 'til Somebody Kills You	Detective Johnson	
2013	Cass	Franklin Morris, Sr.	
2013	King's Faith	Mike	
2013	Home	Dr. Parker	
2018	Night Comes On	Parole Officer	
2020	Lapsis	Felix	

=== Television ===
Year	Title	Role	Notes
1984	All My Children	Mickey	Unknown episodes
1985	Kate & Allie	Reverend	Episode: "Thanksgiving"
1986	American Playhouse	Jack	Episode: "Adventures of Huckleberry Finn, Part 1"
1986	Hill Street Blues	Officer Mason	Episode: "More Skinned Against Than Skinning"
1988	Crime Story	Byron	2 episodes
1988	Internal Affairs	Fred	Television movie
1988	Tattingers		Episode: "Death and Taxis"
1989	A Man Called Hawk	Ringer	Episode: "The Divided Child"
1990	Cop Rock	Officer Franklin Rose	11 episodes
1990	H.E.L.P.	Palmer	Episode: "Fire Down Below"
1990	Murder in Black and White	Fred	Television movie
1990	The Old Man and the Sea		Television movie
1990	Murder Times Seven	Fred	Television movie
1991	L.A. Law	Major Charles Rainero	Episode: "Rest in Pieces"
1991	Law & Order	Michael Ingrams	Episode: "Mushrooms"
1991	Gabriel's Fire	Jackson	Episode: "One Flew Over the Bird's Nest"
1991	Civil Wars	Malik Watson	Episode: "Daveja-Vu All Over Again"
1993	Scam	Daniel Poole	Television movie
1993	Alex Haley's Queen		2 episodes
1993–2001	NYPD Blue	Lt. Arthur Fancy	167 episodes Screen Actors Guild Award for Outstanding Performance by an Ensemble in a Drama Series; Nominated—Image Award for Outstanding Supporting Actor in a Drama Series (1998–2000); Nominated—Primetime Emmy Award for Outstanding Supporting Actor in a Drama Series; Nominated—Screen Actors Guild Award for Outstanding Performance by an Ensemble in a Drama Series (1996–2000); Nominated—Viewers for Quality Television Award for Best Supporting Actor in a Quality Drama Series
1996	Unforgivable	Spider	Television movie
1996	The Road to Galveston	Marcus Roosevelt Sr.	Television movie
1997	A Deadly Vision	Dr. Tony Natale	Television movie
1998	Silencing Mary	Professor Thiel	Television movie
1998	Fantasy Island	Louis / Mr. Burton	2 episodes
1998	The Defenders: Choice of Evils	Jack Casey	Television movie
2000	Deliberate Intent	Lawrence Horn	Television movie
2000	Livin' for Love: The Natalie Cole Story	Nat King Cole	Television movie
2001	Any Day Now	Riley Adams	Episode: "The Contest"
2002	The Division	Brian Lawrence	3 episodes
2002	Taken	General Beers	4 episodes
2003	John Doe	Colonel Dunagan	Episode: "Illegal Alien"
2003	Alligator Point		Television movie
2003	Edge of America	Kenny Williams	Television movie
2003–2005	Las Vegas	Gavin Brunson	3 episodes
2004	Stargate SG-1	General Frances Maynard	2 episodes
2004	Law & Order: Special Victims Unit	Javier Vega	Episode: "Criminal"
2004–2005	Life As We Know It	William Miller	6 episodes
2006	Love Monkey	Derrick Cooper	4 episodes
2006	Conviction	Tony Murno	Episode: "Hostage"
2006	Twenty Questions		Television movie
2007	Numb3rs	Phillip Wright	Episode: "Under Pressure"
2008	Living Hell	Col. Erik Maitland	Television movie
2008	Bunker Hill	Marcus Troy	Television movie
2009	Killer Hair	Mac	Television movie
2009	Hostile Makeover	Mac	Television movie
2010	Beauty & the Briefcase	Mr. Belmont	Television movie
2010–2011	Detroit 1-8-7	Sergeant Jesse Longford	18 episodes
2010–2014	The Good Wife	Detective Lou Johnson	3 episodes
2013	Orange Is the New Black	Jean Baptiste	3 episodes
2013	Murder in a Small Town	Wade Thompson	Television movie
2014	The Following	Agent Phillips	2 episodes
2014	NCIS: New Orleans	Papa Parks	Episode: "Musician Heal Thyself"
2014	Forever	Al Rainey	Episode: "6 A.M."
2014	Hysteria	Doctor Carl Sapsi	Episode: "Pilot"
2015	Blue Bloods	Chief Daniels	Episode: "In The Box"
2015	Madam Secretary	Air Force General Roger Baylis	Episode: "The Show Must Go On"
2015	Limitless	EAD Kenneth Paulson	2 episodes
2015	Chicago P.D.	James Whitaker	2 episodes
2015–2017	The Night Shift	Dr. Julian Cummings	6 episodes
2016	Sleepy Hollow	Ezra Mills	5 episodes
2017	The Blacklist: Redemption	Dan Bishop	2 episodes
2017	Ryan Hansen Solves Crimes on Television	Captain Jackson	Episode: "Pilot"
2017	The Deuce	Editor	2 episodes
2019	Soundtrack	Moses	4 episodes
2019	Whiskey Cavalier	Director of FBI New York Office	Episode: "Pilot"
2020	For Life	Earl	3 episodes
2022	New Amsterdam	Horace Reynolds	2 episodes
2022	Alaska Daily	Secretary Raymond Green; General Raymond Green	2 episodes

== Accolades ==
McDaniel won a 1995 Screen Actors Guild Award for Outstanding Performance by an Ensemble in a Drama Series for NYPD Blue, and won the 2006 Daytime Emmy Award for Outstanding Performer in a Children/Youth/Family Special, "Edge of America". He has also been nominated for two Primetime Emmys for his work on NYPD Blue.

- Obie Award for Before It Hits Home, 1991–1992 season
- Drama Desk nomination for Before It Hits Home, 1991–1992 season
- Clarence Derwent Award
- Peabody Award for "Edge of America" (2005; NYPD Blue episode)
