= Torn (2013 American film) =

- Directed by: Jeremiah Birnbaum
- Screenplay by: Michael Richter
- Story by: Marc Posner; Michael Richter; Jeremiah Birnbaum
- Produced by: Jeremiah Birnbaum; James C.E. Burke; Michael Richter
- Starring: Mahnoor Baloch; Faran Tahir; Dendrie Taylor; John Heard
- Cinematography: Sam Chase
- Edited by: Bruce Cannon
- Music by: Derek Bermel; David Reid
- Production companies: Fog City Pictures; Objective 49; Precept Productions
- Distributed by: Brainstorm Media
- Release date: October 18, 2013 (United States)
- Running time: 80 min
- Countries: United States; Pakistan
- Language: English

Torn is a 2013 drama film directed by Jeremiah Birnbaum and written by Michael Richter and starring Mahnoor Baloch, Faran Tahir, Dendrie Taylor and John Heard. The film was released on October 18, 2013.

== Premise ==
The film is the story of two mothers Maryam (Mahnoor Baloch) and Lea (Dendrie Taylor) who are grieving over their dead teenage sons and then begin to wonder if the other's son wasn't responsible for their child's death.

== Cast ==
- Mahnoor Baloch as Maryam
- Faran Tahir as Ali Munsif
- Sagar Parekh as Walter Munsif
- Dendrie Taylor as Lea
- John Heard as Detective Kalkowitz
- Patrick St. Esprit as Charles
- Jordan Parrott as Eddie
- Jeffrey Weissman as Mr. Angr

== Production ==
=== Casting ===
In September 2012, it was reported that the Canadian-Pakistani actress Mahnoor Baloch was being cast in the film, in her Hollywood debut.

== Release ==
First trailer and poster was released on September 3, 2013. Later a new trailer was released.

The film was initially limited released on October 18, 2013 at Village East Cinema in New York City.
