= The Harimaya Bridge =

- Directed by: Aaron Woolfolk
- Written by: Aaron Woolfolk
- Produced by: Ko Mori; Aaron Woolfolk
- Starring: Ben Guillory; Saki Takaoka; Misa Shimizu; Danny Glover
- Cinematography: Masao Nakabori
- Edited by: John Coniglio
- Music by: Kazunori Maruyama
- Distributed by: T-Joy
- Release dates: June 6, 2009 (Japan); March 12, 2010 (United States)
- Running time: 120 minutes
- Countries: Japan; United States
- Languages: English; Japanese

The Harimaya Bridge is a 2009 film written and directed by American filmmaker Aaron Woolfolk. It was filmed in Kōchi Prefecture, Japan and San Francisco. The film had a nationwide theatrical release in Japan in 2009 and an independent theatrical release in the United States in 2010. The film was released on DVD in Japan at the end of 2009 and was released on DVD and video-on-demand by Funimation in the United States in 2011.

The title references the Harimaya bridge in Kochi City, which is connected to a well-known Japanese story about forbidden love.

The film was produced by Ko Mori and Aaron Woolfolk. Executive producers are Danny Glover, Naoshi Yoda, and John Kim. Co-producers are Muneyuki Kii and Tatsuya Kimura. Associate producers are James Lane and Lee Rudnicki.

The film's theme song, "Shūten: Kimi no Ude no Naka", was sung by Japanese singer Misono, who released the song as her 13th single.

== Plot ==
The story concerns an American man who must travel to rural Japan after his estranged son dies there in a car crash. While there, he discovers some secrets his son has left behind. The Harimaya Bridge is a film about racism and forgiveness. The main character lost his son and had to go to Japan to retrieve some of his son's paintings. The father (main character) had a very strong dislike for the Japanese people. He was very rude towards them in the beginning. He disrespected their culture as well on several occasions. One time he ignored the Japanese people when they told him to take off his shoes when he entered the home he was staying in with them. It took him a few minutes to get him to respect their wish and take off his shoes.

While the father was in Japan he found out many things he never knew about his son. For one, his son was married to a Japanese woman and they had a child together. The father and his son clearly did not share a strong, loving and respectful relationship. In one scene, the two got in a fight and the father kicked the son out of the home. This was the last straw for the son and might have caused him to move to Japan and keep his life under wraps from his father. Towards the end of the film the father experiences some things that make him confront his hatred and disrespectfulness towards the Japanese. His first encounter with his granddaughter is what makes him change.

== Cast ==
- Ben Guillory as Daniel Holder
- Saki Takaoka as Noriko Kubo
- Misa Shimizu as Yuiko Hara
- Danny Glover as Joseph Holder
- Misono as Saita Nakayama
- Honoka Ishibashi as Emi Osaki
- Victor Grant as Mickey Holder
- A'da Alison Woolfolk as Lindsey Holder
- Miho Shiraishi as Kayo Takeuchi
- Akira Hamada as Principal Shimura
- Junkichi Orimoto as Tomoki Shide
- Peter Coyote as Albert Tunney
- Hajime Yamazaki as Kunji Inoue
- Toshiyuki Kitami as Mr. Kubo
- Yukiko Kashiwagi as Ms. Kubo
