= Down with the King =

Down with the King can refer to

- Down with the King (album), a 1993 music album by Run-D.M.C.
  - "Down with the King" (song), the title track from the album
- Down with the King (game), 1981 fantasy political card game by Avalon Hill
