= Michele Lowe =

American playwright

- Born: November 1, 1957 (age 68); Hempstead, NY
- Education: Northwestern University (BSJ)
- Occupations: Playwright and Librettist
- Notable work: The Smell of the Kill
- Website: michelelowe.net

Michele Lowe (born November 1, 1957) is an American playwright and librettist whose work has been produced on Broadway, off Broadway and around the world. She received the Francesca Primus Prize in 2010 for her play Inana. She is the only playwright in the history of the Steinberg/ATCA New Play Award to be nominated and receive finalist status in one season. She is also the recipient of two Edgerton Foundation New Play Awards. She is Jewish.

== Early life and education ==
Lowe was raised in Massapequa Park, New York. She is the daughter of Doris Lowe and Marshall Lowe. She graduated from Massapequa High School in 1975 and received a BSJ from Northwestern University's Medill School of Journalism in 1979. Ogilvy and Mather attempted to hire her as a copywriter in her junior year, but she opted to remain in school.

== Career ==
Lowe worked as a copywriter at Foote, Cone & Belding (True North) and later J. Walter Thompson (WPP). In 1984 she won over 50 international awards including a Gold Lion at the Cannes Advertising Film Festival for “I'll Have the Soup” (Kraft Miracle Whip) and a Clio for "Skunk" (Lowe’s Brand Kitty Litter (no relation to Ed Lowe). At the time, she was the youngest person ever made a VP at JWT. After a stint as a senior VP and associate creative director at BBDO she left the business full time and enrolled in Playwrights Horizons Theatre school where she was mentored by Robert Moss and Neal Bell.

== Theatre ==
Lowe is a member of the Dramatists Guild and sits on the Publications Committee. She regularly writes for The Dramatist Guild Magazine.

=== Plays ===
==== The Smell of the Kill ====
The story of three women who want to kill their husbands and get the chance to do it, The Smell of the Kill premiered at Cleveland Playhouse in 1999. Elizabeth Ireland and Nelle Nugent teamed up to produce it on Broadway. It opened in March 2002 at the Helen Hayes Theater with Chris Ashley directing. It has been produced hundreds of times around the world and translated into over two dozen languages including French, Korean, Greek, Spanish, Estonian, Czech, and Icelandic.

==== String of Pearls ====
String of Pearls is about a group of women and the necklace that touches each of them over the course of 35 years. Four actresses play 27 roles. The show opened at City Theatre Pittsburgh in 2003 and was then produced by Primary Stages off Broadway at 59 E 59 Theater in October 2004 with Eric Simonson directing.

==== Inana ====
On the eve of the U.S. invasion of Baghdad, one man, an Iraqi museum curator plots to save the statue of Inana, Goddess of War and Sex, from destruction. Fleeing to London with his young bride, he makes a life-altering deal to ensure the statue's preservation. A window of hope and healing, a love story amidst a background of international and personal intrigue. Inana opened at Denver Center Theatre with Michael Pressman directing in January, 2009.

==== Moses ====
How do you start over after everything you love has been erased? Moses is solo show about one man’s epic journey as he searches for forgiveness, a long lost-dream, and himself. The world premiere starred Grant Harrison and was directed by Johanna Gruenhut at Theater J in Washington D.C. It ran December 5-23, 2023.

==== Split ====
Split, an original music conceived by and with a book by Michele Lowe and music and lyrics by Zoe Sarnak, tells the powerful story of Lillian, a former research scientist at Los Alamos during WWII, and her daughter Amy, as they embark on a road trip to the Grand Canyon in the summer of 1953. This mother and daughter are bound by family ties and a love of science, but Lillian's secret goal is to set Amy's life on a different course. Along the way they meet Ray, an Army veteran on his way home from the service. Over the course of a few days these three people impact each other in ways none of them could have ever predicted. Split was commissioned by Transport Group. A workshop production directed by Jack Cummings III played for five performances at the New London Theater Barn in New London NH in September 2024.

=== Other plays ===
- The Greatest (2017)
- Map of Heaven (2011)
- Victoria Musica (2009)
- A Thousand Words Come to Mind with composer Scott Davenport Richards (2008)
- Mezzulah, 1946 (2007)
- Backsliding in the Promised Land (2003)

=== Other works ===
- Queen Esther monologue in Motherhood Out Loud (2011)

== Residencies ==
- Cape Cod Theatre Project (2020)
- Artist in Residence, Sundance Theatre Lab (2017)
- New York Stage and Film (2012, 2002)
- New Harmony Project (2006)
- Colorado New Play Summit (2005, 2008)
- Play Labs, Playwrights Center (2006)
- O’Neill National Music Theatre Conference (1991)
- Hedgebrook (2000)

== Awards and nominations ==
- 2021 Theater J Trish Vradenburg New Play Prize (finalist) - Moses
- 2010 Edgerton New Play Award
- 2010 Francesca Primus Prize
- 2010 Steinberg/ATCA New Play Award (finalist) - Inana
- 2010 Steinberg/ATCA New Play Award (finalist)- Victoria Musica
- 2009 Susan Smith Blackburn Prize (finalist) - Inana
- 2008 Edgerton New Play Award
- 2005 Outer Critics Circle Best Play (nomination) — String of Pearls
- 2004 Robert M Frankel Award, City Theatre, Pittsburgh
- 1984 Gold Lion, Cannes Advertising Film Festival, Kraft Miracle Whip "I'll Have the Soup"
- 1984 Clio — Lowe’s Kitty Litter "Skunk"

== Personal life ==
Lowe resides in New York and is the mother of Isadora Lowe Porte.
