= Levy Lee Simon =

American dramatist

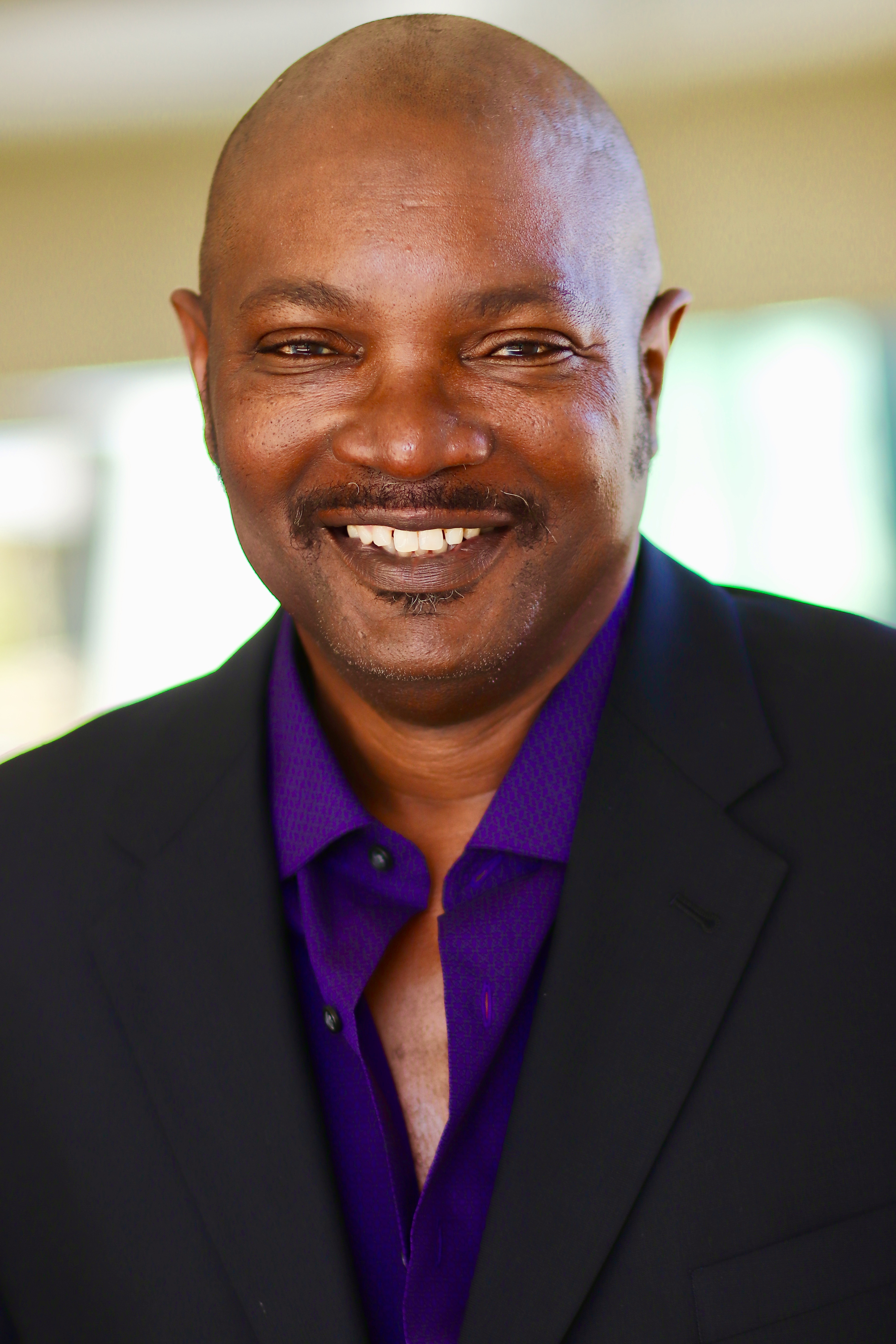
- Born: Levy Simon, Jr. Harlem, New York
- Education: University of Iowa; Cheyney State College
- Occupations: Author, playwright, screenwriter, actor, director, producer

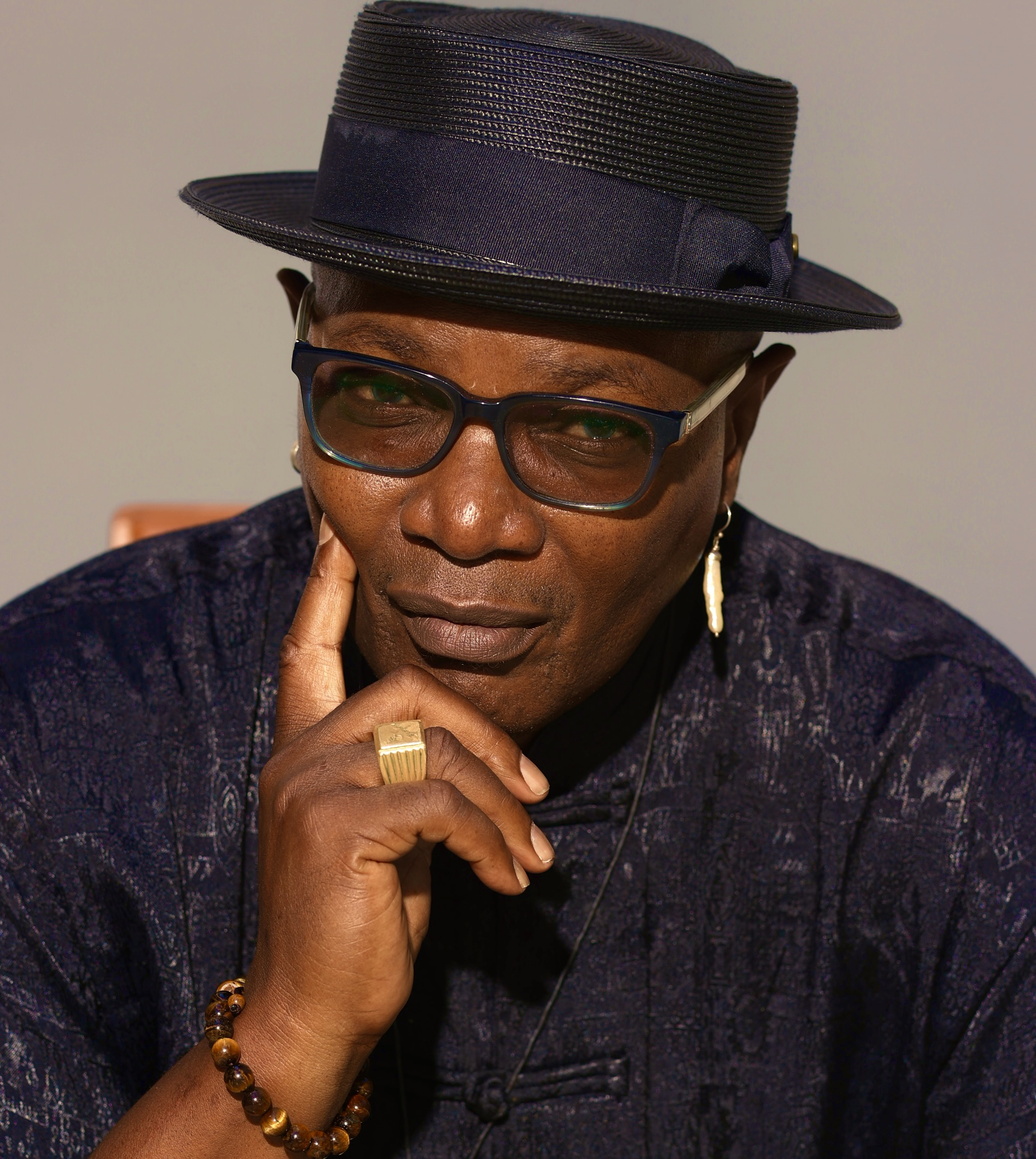

Levy Lee Simon is an American playwright, actor, director and screenwriter, perhaps best known for his trilogy about the struggle for Haitian independence, For the Love of Freedom.

== Biography ==
Levy "Lee" Simon, Jr. was born in Harlem, New York. While an undergraduate at Cheyney State College in Pennsylvania in the early 1980s, Levy first became seriously interested in the theatre. His girlfriend had purchased tickets for them to see For Colored Girls Who Have Considered Suicide When the Rainbow Is Enuf. "The Lady in Red", a character in the play, performed a piece about Toussaint L'Ouverture, which inspired Simon to learn more about the Haitian revolt. This eventually led to the development of his trilogy For the Love of Freedom. Other plays by Simon include: The Bow-Wow Club and God, the Crackhouse, and the Devil, Same Train, The Stuttering Preacher, The Guest at Central Park West, Caseload, Pitbulls and Daffodils, The Last Revolutionary, The Magnificent Dunbar Hotel and, Gentrified - Metaphor of the Drums.

His screenplay adaptation of The Bow-Wow Club was optioned by Fox Searchlight and Spirit Dance, Forest Whitaker's production company. Screenplay/Film credits also include: "The Last Revolutionary," Indie Rights Films and The "Stuttering Preacher" Indie Rights Films.

His acting credits include: Walter Lee in A Raisin in the Sun Apollo Theatre with 12 year old Tupac Shakur. "Junior in the Arena Stage production of Before It Hits Home the Broadway production of Pulitzer Prize Winning - "The Kentucky Cycle." Mac Perkins in the play and feature film, "The Last Revolutionary," and Eddie in, "In the Upper Room" at Denver Center for the Performing Arts.

== Selected plays ==
See Doollee.com:

- The Bow-Wow Club
- Caseload
- For the Love of Freedom
- God, the Crackhouse and the Devil
- The Guest at Central Park West'
- Same Train
- The Stuttering Preacher
- Smell the Power
- Pitbulls and Daffodils
- The Magnificent Dunbar Hotel
- The Last Revolutionary
- A Heated Discussion
- A Heat Discussion - revisited
- Gentrified - Metaphor of the Drums
- Fractured
- Return of the Revolutionary

== Honors and awards ==
- 1999: Kennedy Center/ACTF Lorraine Hansberry Award - The Bow-Wow Club
- 2001: NAACP Best Playwright nomination - For the Love of Freedom, Part I: Toussaint - the Soul - Rise and Revolution
- 2003: Ovation Award nomination - For the Love of Freedom, Part II: Dessalines - The Heart - Blood and Liberation
- 2006: NAACP Theatre Award nomination, "Best Playwright" - For the Love of Freedom, Part III: Christophe - the Spirit - Passion and Glory
- 2007: Audelco Award, Best Playwright for The Guest at Central Park West, Best Dramatic Production of the Year and Best Playwright.
- 2022 - Playwright of the Year - San Diego Writer Festival
- 2022 - Best Supporting Actor nomination - Colorado Theatre Guild - "In the Upper Room."
