= The Smell of the Kill =

- Original language: English
- Written by: Michele Love
- Characters: Nicky; Molly; Debra; Jay; Danny; Marty
- Genre: Comedy

Premiere
- Date: January 1999
- Place: Cleveland Play House; Cleveland, Ohio

The Smell of the Kill is a play by Michele Lowe that premiered at Cleveland Play House in 1999. A dark comedy about housewives facing marital crises, and then opportunity, when their husbands accidentally trap themselves in a meat locker, opened on Broadway at the Helen Hayes Theatre March 26, 2002 and ran to April 28, 2002. The cast starred Lisa Emery, Claudia Shear and Jessica Stone, with direction by Christopher Ashley.

It closed after 40 performances.
