= Ben Guillory =

American actor, theater producer and director (born 1949)

- Born: November 7, 1949 (age 76); Baton Rouge, Louisiana, US
- Occupations: Actor, theatre producer
- Years active: 1970–present

Bennet Guillory (born November 7, 1949 in Baton Rouge, Louisiana) is an American actor, theatre producer and director.

== Biography ==
Raised in San Francisco, California, Guillory co-founded the Robey Theatre Company in honor of actor, activist, and operatic singer Paul Robeson, with actor Danny Glover in Los Angeles in 1994, is its artistic director. He received an Ovation Award nomination for Featured Actor in a Play in 2008, for his performance as Wining Boy in The Piano Lesson produced at The Hayworth Theatre in Los Angeles.

== Filmography ==
Year	Title	Role	Notes
1985	The Color Purple	Grady	
1987	The Kindred	Dr. Stone	
1987	Maid to Order	George Sterling	
1987	Walker	Achilles Kewen	
1994	Open Fire	Commander Simpson	
1995	The Tuskegee Airmen	Hannibal's father	Television film
1997	Star Wars Jedi Knight: Dark Forces II	Qu Rahn	Video game
1997	Babylon 5	Leif Tanner	Season 4, Episode: "The Deconstruction of Falling Stars"
1998	JAG	Professor Dobuto	Episode: "Embassy"
2000	3 Strikes	Stan Wilson	
2001	They Crawl	Captain Righetti	
2001	Falling Like This	Mr. Salas	
2001	Charmed	The Source	First episodes of Season 4
2003	The West Wing	Rep. Jackson	Episode: "7A WF 83429"
2007	Daddy's Little Girls	Principal	
2009	The Nation	Master Fard Muhammad	
2009	The Harimaya Bridge	Daniel Holder	
2009	Repo Chick	Rogers	
2011	Toussaint	The Curmudgeon	Associate producer
