= Lindsay Jones (composer) =

American composer and sound designer

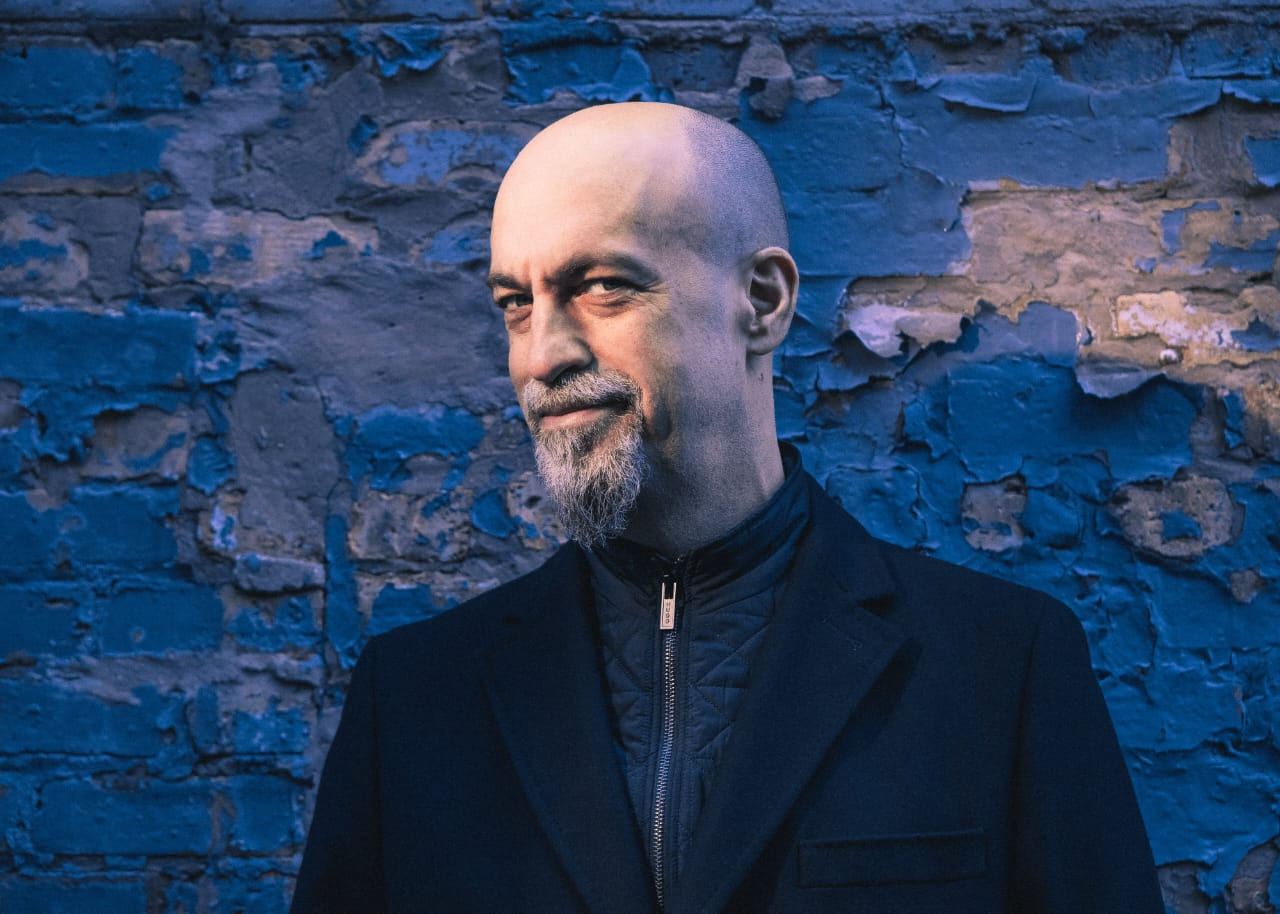
- Jones in 2020
- Born: Lindsay Draper Jones; Durham, North Carolina, US
- Education: University of North Carolina School of the Arts (BFA)
- Occupations: Composer and sound designer for film, theatre, TV, and new media
- Website: www.lindsayjones.com

Lindsay Draper Jones is an American composer, sound designer, and educator. His career spans over three decades and includes nominations for Tony Award, Drama Desk Awards, and Helen Hayes Awards, as well as wins and nominations in regional theatre and film. He has taught and lectured at universities and schools across the country.

== Early life and education ==
Lindsay Draper Jones was born in Durham, North Carolina. At the age of three, he moved to Laurinburg, NC, before finally moving to Winston-Salem at the age of eight, where he would spend the rest of his childhood.

He attended the University of North Carolina School of the Arts and received a BFA in Acting.

In 2017, Lindsay was inducted into the inaugural class of his alma mater's Richard J. Reynolds High School Arts Hall Of Fame in Winston-Salem, NC.

== Career ==
=== Theatrical ===
Jones began his career in sound design and composition for theatre in 1994 when he was asked to design a production of "Suburbia" for Roadworks Productions in Chicago.

Jones has worked in both Broadway and off-Broadway theatre. His Broadway credits include Slave Play (2020), The Nap (2018), Bronx Bombers (2014), and A Time to Kill (2013). He is one of only five individuals in Tony Awards history to have received nominations for both Best Sound Design of a Play and Best Original Score. Jones’ work has also been featured in major regional theatres across the United States, with more than 600 productions to his credit.

Notable off-Broadway works have been heard at Playwrights Horizons, The Public Theater, MCC, and Primary Stages. He has also contributed to productions at renowned international theatres such as the Noël Coward Theatre in London’s West End, the Royal Shakespeare Festival in the UK, Traverse Theatre (Edinburgh, Scotland), Market Theater (Johannesburg, South Africa), Baxter Theatre (Cape Town, South Africa), Standard Theatre (Harare, Zimbabwe), and the English Theatre (Vienna, Austria) and the Stratford Festival in Canada. His most recent work in the West End includes his London debut with Slave Play at the Noël Coward Theatre (June 29, 2024 - September 21, 2024).

Jones made his Broadway debut on October 20, 2013 with the production of "A Time To Kill" at the Golden Theatre, providing both original music and sound design. His second show on Broadway was "Bronx Bombers" at Circle in the Square Theatre, with its first performance on January 10, 2014. Jones has designed and composed for nearly 60 plays off-Broadway. He has designed and composed for over 500 plays at regional theaters across the United States.

Jones collaborated in 2009 and 2010 with Bill T. Jones (no relation) and the Bill T. Jones/Arnie Zane Dance Company on a special multimedia dance concert entitled "Fondly Do We Hope, Fervently Do We Pray", based on the life of Abraham Lincoln. This show played many performances across the United States as well as around the world. The 2011 documentary film "A Good Man" was created about the artistic process of this project.

In October 2020, he was nominated for the Tony Award for Best Original Score and the Tony Award for Best Sound Design for his work on Slave Play.

=== Film ===
Jones has created original scores for over 35 film and television projects. His film credits include The View From Tall, Ash, and The Brass Teapot, along with television series such as Family Practice (Lifetime Television). Jones’ recent film projects include Dinosaur Discoveries and Surviving the Sleepover, a film that premiered on Lifetime Television on March 23, 2024.

His first major success in film came with the release of the 2005 documentary film A Note of Triumph: The Golden Age of Norman Corwin, directed by Eric Simonson and produced for HBO Films. The movie went on to win the Academy Award for Best Documentary (Short Subject) and Jones' score was described by a reviewer as "very varied and poignant" and "a great setting for Corwin's persona".

Other films that Jones has scored includes: The Brass Teapot (directed by Ramaa Mosley), Defamation, Hollywood Forever, Mary, Ash, Grace, KinShip, Los Desaparecidos, Asparagus! Stalking The American Life, Urban Scrawls, American Passport, Armed Response, Alfred Mann, and Cleave Land.

He made his television scoring debut with Family Practice on the Lifetime Network, produced by Sony Television.

Jones recently made his first entry into scoring video games with The Digits: Fraction Blast.

He has created music for a number of commercials, including Martha Stewart/Staples, Nike, the Life Foundation and the audio logo for Dow Microbial Control. An excerpt of Jones's sound design for "Fondly Do We Hope, Fervently Do We Pray" was featured on the CBS telecast of the 2010 Kennedy Center Honors.

Jones has also appeared as himself in the 2011 documentary film A Good Man.

=== Podcasts and audio drama ===
Jones has composed original scores for projects such as Star Wars: Tempest Breaker (Penguin/Random House) and Marvel Wastelanders (Marvel), which stars Susan Sarandon, Timothy Busfield, and Stephen Lang. He is the in-house composer and sound designer for The Imagine Neighborhood, a podcast produced by the Committee For Children, and for Play On Podcasts, a series from Next Chapter Podcasts. Jones has also worked on audio dramas including A Streetcar Named Desire (starring Audra McDonald) for Audible, Wormwood (featuring Kevin Kline), and Hamlet for KPBS/The Old Globe.

=== Teaching ===
Jones has taught and/or lectured at Yale University, Northwestern University, The Theatre School at DePaul University, The National High School Institute and Chicago Academy for the Arts.

== Awards ==
Jones' work has brought nominations for Tony Award, Drama Desk Awards, and Helen Hayes Awards, as well as wins and nominations in regional theatre and film.

=== Wins ===
- Signal Award (2024) – Best Original Score/Music, As You Like It (Next Chapter Podcasts)
- Ambie Award (2024)– Best Original Score/Music, Othello (Next Chapter Podcasts)
- Signal Award (2023) – Best Original Score/Music, Othello (Next Chapter Podcasts)
- Joseph Jefferson Award (2014) – Best Sound Design, Grounded (American Blues Theater)
- 2010 Ovation Awards – Best Sound Design, Through the Night (Geffen Playhouse)

=== Nominations ===
Jones has received seven Joseph Jefferson Awards and twenty-three nominations,

- Tony Award (2020) Best Score, Slave Play (Golden Theatre)
- Tony Award (2020) – Best Sound Design of a Play, Slave Play (Golden Theatre)
- Helen Hayes Award (2018) – Sound Design, Twelfth Night (Shakespeare Theatre, Washington, D.C.)
- Barrymore Award (2016) – Best Sound Design, Hans Brinker and the Silver Skates (Arden Theatre, Philadelphia)
- Drama Desk Award (2011) – Drama Desk Award for Outstanding Sound Design in a Musical, The Burnt Part Boys (Playwrights Horizons)
- ASCAP Plus Awards
- Two Ovation Awards and three nominations,
- Los Angeles Drama Critics Circle Award,
- San Diego Theatre Critics Circle Award and two nominations,
- 2010 Garland Award
- Ticket Holder Award and a Chicago Stage Talk Award.
- Received three nominations for Drama Desk Awards and two nominations for Helen Hayes Award
- Nominations for Henry Hewes Design Awards, Barrymore Awards, LA Weekly Theatre Awards, Austin Critics Table Awards, Connecticut Critics Circle Awards, AUDELCO Awards and NAACP Theatre Awards. Lindsay was the first composer/sound designer to win the Michael Maggio Emerging Designer Award.

== Other activities ==
Lindsay was the singer/bassist/songwriter for the Chicago-based rock band The Nubile Thangs!, from 1990 - 2001. The band released 3 albums, toured extensively throughout the US and Canada, and appeared on an episode of the television show America's Most Wanted. The band also appeared on several episodes of The Jenny Jones Show.

Lindsay appeared as Joe B Mauldin in the national Broadway tour of Buddy! The Buddy Holly Story in 1992-93.

Along with composer/sound designer John Gromada, Lindsay was the creator of The Collaborator Party, which is a yearly event for the entire theatre-sound community that was sparked by the elimination of The Tony Awards for sound design.

He is a founding member and co-chair of the executive board of the Theatrical Sound Designers and Composers Association (TSDCA) and co-founded The Collaborator Party with John Gromada.
