= Cheryl West =

American playwright (born 1965)

Cheryl L. West (born October 23, 1965, Chicago) is an American playwright.

== Life and career ==
West holds a degree from the University of Illinois Urbana-Champaign. She worked as a social worker and taught before turning to playwriting.

In 1990, she went to Seattle for The Group Theatre's Multicultural Playwrights Festival, where she won the opportunity to workshop her play, Before It Hits Home. That play went on to be produced at Arena Stage. On June 12, 1991, her play Jar the Floor had its world premiere at Seattle's The Empty Space Theater. In 1999, she relocated to Seattle.

She won a National Endowment for the Arts Playwrighting Award for 1995–96. Also making a successful foray into film, her play Before It Hits Home has been optioned by Spike Lee; and she has been asked to pen a film adaptation for Home Box Office and write an original screenplay for Paramount Studios. She had been commissioned to write a dramatic adaptation of Richard Wright's 1940 novel Native Son.

A film version of her play Holiday Heart premiered on Showtime in 2000, starring Ving Rhames and Alfre Woodard.

In 2012, the Seattle Repertory Theatre premiered her play Pullman Porter Blues. In 2017, the Pasadena Playhouse premiered her play Shout Sister Shout!

In 2019, West was commissioned by the Goodman Theatre for a show about civil rights activist Fannie Lou Hamer. The one-woman show, Fannie (The Music and Life of Fannie Lou Hamer), initially needed to be performed outdoors in a public park due to the COVID-19 pandemic but received positive reviews in both its outdoor version as well as for its return to indoor performance.

== Awards ==
- Before It Hits Home Susan Smith Blackburn Prize Co-winner, 1990, AUDELCO Award for Outstanding Play, 1991, Helen Hayes Charles McArthur Award Winner, Outstanding New Play, 1992
- Jar the Floor, Beverly Hills/Hollywood NAACP Best Play, 1995

== Works ==
=== Plays ===
- Before It Hits Home - 1991 Before It Hits Home. Dramatists Play Service, Inc. 1999. ISBN 978-0-8222-1322-2.
- Jar the Floor. Dramatists Play Service, Inc. 2002. ISBN 978-0-8222-1809-8.
- Puddin 'n Pete – 1993
- Holiday Heart – 1994
- Play On! – 1997
- Birdie Blue – 2005
- Rejoice
- Addy: An American Girl Story
- Blues to the Bone
- Elocutia Does Pygmalion
- Pullman Porter Blues - 2012
- Lizzie Bright and the Buckminster Boy
- Squeeze, Hold Release
- Basketcases
- Mwindo
- Akeelah and the Bee
- Shout Sister Shout! – 2017
- Lady Jazz
- Last Stop on Market Street
- The Watsons Go to Birmingham
- Fannie - 2019
- Something Happened in Our Town - 2022

=== Teleplays ===
- Diary of a Single Mom (1 episode, 2009)
- Life Raft (2009) TV episode (writer)
- Glitter (2001) (story)
- Holiday Heart (2000) (TV) (teleplay)
- Play On! (2000) (TV) (writer)
