= Rodney Kageyama =

Nisei Japanese-American stage, film and TV actor (1941–2018)

- Born: Rodney Masao Kageyama; November 1, 1941; San Mateo, California, US
- Died: December 9, 2018 (aged 77)
- Occupation: Actor
- Years active: 1965–2018
- Spouse: Ken White

Rodney Masao Kageyama (November 1, 1941 – December 9, 2018) was an American stage, film and TV actor. He was a Nisei Japanese American (second-generation) and besides acting in Asian American theater groups, he was also a director and designer. With his roles in the “Gung Ho” film and television series and the “Karate Kid” franchise, he was a trailblazer for Asian Americans in Hollywood.

== Career ==
=== Theatre ===
Born in nearby San Mateo, Kageyama began his career in San Francisco in 1965 as one of the original members of the Asian American Theater Company. While in San Francisco he attended the American Conservatory Theater. In 1979, Kageyama moved to Los Angeles where he joined the Asian American theatre group, East West Players (EWP), working as an actor, director, and designer. In 1985 he received a Drama-Logue Award for Costume Design for EWP's Rashomon.

In 1993, Kageyama directed The Grapevine, written by Grateful Crane Ensemble founder Soji Kashiwagi, produced at the Los Angeles Theatre Center.

In spring 2001, Kageyama played Erronius in an all Asian American production of the musical, A Funny Thing Happened on the Way to the Forum at EWP in Los Angeles.

=== Film and television ===
He acted on many films, notably The Karate Kid Part II, The Next Karate Kid, Gung Ho (and its subsequent television spin-off), and Showdown in Little Tokyo. He was also featured in the Golden Dreams film exhibit which opened the Disney California Adventure Park theme park. He appeared in many television shows including Quantum Leap and Home Improvement.

Kageyama befriended Chris Tashima, founder of Cedar Grove OnStage, on the set of a Coca-Cola commercial shoot in 1984. Kageyama has subsequently costume designed and served as a crew member on different short films directed by Tashima, including the Academy Award-winning Visas and Virtue (1997).

== Personal life ==
Kageyama was heavily involved in community activity, often volunteering for various organizations. He served as an emcee and directed shows for many charitable events. He was a docent at the Japanese American National Museum, where he did story telling for visiting children. He was also an animal advocate and helped place dogs in homes.

In 2007, Kageyama was diagnosed with Non-Hodgkin lymphoma. He underwent chemotherapy and as of spring 2008 was declared cancer-free. He had numerous other health issues including dealing with complications from HIV for decades before his death. He had both hips replaced and walked with a cane. In his last years, he was on dialysis due to a kidney illness.

He married his long time partner, Ken White, in 2013 when California legalized same-sex unions. They remained together until his death.

== Honors and awards ==
- 2006 "Community Treasures" Award, Cherry Blossom Festival of Southern California
- 2005 "Rae Creevey" Award (for volunteer service), East West Players 39th Anniversary Awards

== Filmography ==
Year	Title	Role	Notes
1982	Best Friends	Meter Reader	
1985	Teen Wolf	Janitor	
1986	Gung Ho	Ito	
1988	Vibes	Dr. Harmon	
1988	Lucky Stiff	Tailor	
1989	Let It Ride	Patron in Chinese Restaurant	
1990	Pretty Woman	Japanese Businessman	
1991	Showdown in Little Tokyo	Eddie	
1994	The Next Karate Kid	Monk	
1999	Godzilla 2000		Voice
2000	Stanley's Gig	Jeff Fujisaki	
2014	The Three Dogateers	Mr. Hiroshi	
