= Cedar Grove Productions =

- Type: Entertainment
- Genre: Asian Pacific American media and theatre arts
- Founded: 1996
- Founder: Tim Toyama, Co-founder; Chris Tashima, Co-founder; Chris Donahue, Co-founder
- Headquarters: Los Angeles, California, United States
- Area served: Worldwide
- Divisions: Motion pictures, television, theatre
- Website: www.cedargroveproductions.com

Cedar Grove Productions is an independent production company based in Los Angeles, California, specializing in media and theatre arts representing the Asian Pacific American community. Media projects are educational, with Visual Communications (VC) serving as a non-profit fiscal sponsor.

== Motion picture background ==
The company was founded in 1996 by playwright Tim Toyama, actor/director Chris Tashima, producer Chris Donahue and actor/director Tom Donaldson, to bring the story of Holocaust rescuer Chiune “Sempo” Sugihara to the screen by adapting Toyama’s original one-act, Visas and Virtue, as a narrative short film. Visas and Virtue (1997) film won the Academy Award for Live Action Short Film at the 70th Academy Awards. In tribute to that film's subject, the company takes its name from the literal translation of "Sugihara": sugi (Japanese: 杉) meaning cedar, and hara (Japanese: 原) meaning field or grove. Company describes itself as, "... dedicated to developing and producing projects which boldly defy mainstream Hollywood by giving Asian Americans the close-up on screen, or the spotlight on stage."

== Television ==
Cedar Grove Productions produced Day of Independence, a narrative short film broadcast as a half-hour PBS television special on KHET/PBS Hawai'i in 2005. Produced by Lisa Onodera, the program received an Emmy nomination from the NATAS San Francisco/Northern California Chapter, in the category of Historical/Cultural – Program/Special. The fact-based story followed a young Nisei (second-generation Japanese American) baseball player during the Japanese American internment in World War II.

== Theatre ==
In 2006, Cedar Grove OnStage was formed, as a sister company focusing on live theatre. It joined a multicultural consortium called the "Cultural Roundtable" at THE NEW LATC. Cedar Grove OnStage develops, produces and presents new Asian American theatre works, with Cedar Grove Productions co-founder Tashima serving as Artistic Director. Productions will be presented at the LATC venues in downtown Los Angeles. Other performance groups belonging to the Cultural Roundtable include the Latino Theater Company, Playwrights' Arena, Robey Theatre Company, Culture Clash, and American Indian Dance Theatre/Project HOOP.

Cedar Grove OnStage developed Be Like Water, a play written by award-winning performance artist Dan Kwong, which was produced by East West Players, in association with Cedar Grove OnStage, in September 2008.

== Educational Efforts ==
In 2000, Cedar Grove Productions organized and presented "The AJA Circle: Artists of Japanese Ancestry", a day-long seminar where Japanese and Japanese American theatre artists came together to share cultural experiences of the Japanese American community's history in the U.S. and the artistic community of Asian Americans working in Hollywood. Moderated by playwright/producer Soji Kashiwagi and Tashima, panelists included Nisei playwrights Hiroshi Kashiwagi and Wakako Yamauchi, as well as noted actors George Takei, Tamlyn Tomita, Clyde Kusatsu, Amy Hill, Marcus Toji and Greg Watanabe.

== Recognition ==
Community organizations have recognized Cedar Grove Productions for cultural and artistic contributions. Honors include the Biennium Award from the Japanese American Citizens League, a Community Award given by the Japanese American Service Committee, of Chicago, a Special Recognition Award from the Japanese American Cultural & Community Center, a Visionary Award from East West Players, and a Humanitarian Award received from The “1939” Club, a Holocaust Survivors’ organization.
