= Chris Tashima =

Japanese American actor and director

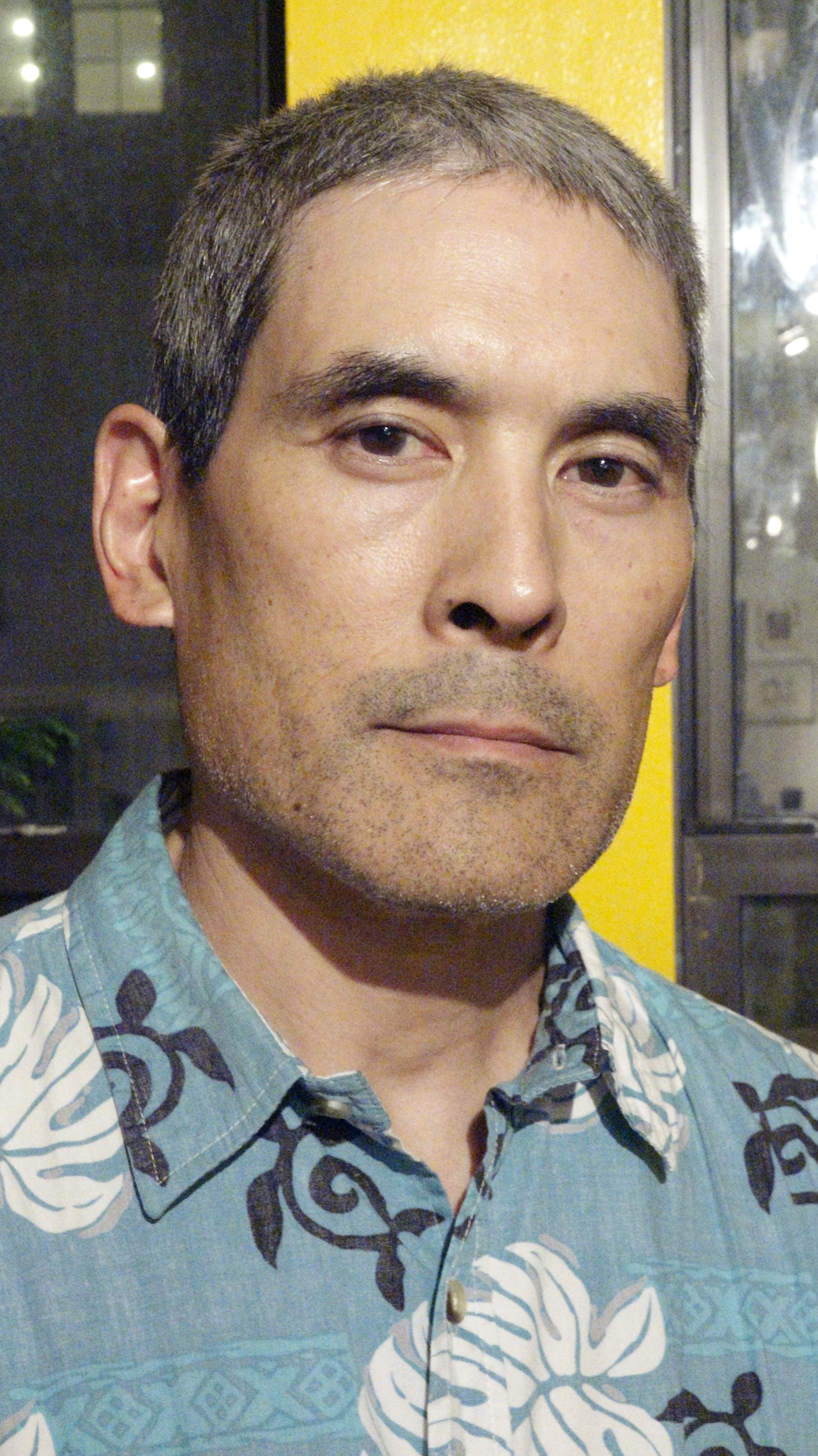
- Tashima in 2014
- Born: Christopher Inadomi Tashima; March 24, 1960 (age 66); Cambridge, Massachusetts, U.S.
- Occupations: Actor; director; screenwriter; set designer
- Years active: 1985–present
- Father: A. Wallace Tashima
- Awards: Live Action Short Film; Won 1998: Visas and Virtue Regional – Northern California Area; Historical / Cultural – Program / Special; Nominated 2006: Day of Independence Academy Award for Live Action Short Film; Won 1998: Visas and Virtue; Ovation Award; Set Design, Smaller Theatre; Won 1995: Sweeney Todd (East West Players); LA Weekly Theater Award; Ensemble Performance; Won 1994: A Language of Their Own (Celebration Theatre); Drama-Logue Award; Scenic Design; Won 1992: Into the Woods (East West Players)

Christopher Inadomi Tashima (born March 24, 1960) is an American actor and director. He is co-founder of the entertainment company Cedar Grove Productions and Artistic Director of its Asian American theatre company, Cedar Grove OnStage. Tashima directed, co-wrote, and starred in the 26-minute film Visas and Virtue for which he and producer Chris Donahue won the 1998 Academy Award for Live Action Short Film.

== Personal ==
Tashima was born on the East Coast, while his father (Judge A. Wallace Tashima) attended Harvard Law School, but grew up in California. He lived in Pasadena, where he began Suzuki Method violin at age 6. His family moved to Berkeley, where he lived for nine years, attending The College Preparatory School. He returned to Southern California, graduating from John Marshall High School (1978). He attended UC Santa Cruz (Porter College), where he studied film production. He also attended UCLA, and took additional filmmaking courses at Visual Communications (VC). He started his acting career at East West Players in 1985. He is the son of U.S. Circuit Judge A. Wallace Tashima.

He currently resides in Los Angeles, California.

== Actor ==
Tashima stars as the romantic lead opposite Joan Chen in Eric Byler's Americanese, an unreleased feature from IFC First Take. The film won two awards after its world premiere at the SXSW Film Festival, including a Special Jury Prize for Outstanding Ensemble Cast. He has also appeared in Sherwood Hu's Lani Loa - The Passage (1998) with Angus Macfadyen, and Rea Tajiri's Strawberry Fields (1997) with Suzy Nakamura. He starred opposite Tamlyn Tomita in the 1995 AFI short, Requiem, directed by actress Elizabeth Sung. Tashima also played the real-life historical figure, journalist and civil rights advocate Sei Fujii in George Shaw's and Jeffrey Gee Chin's short film, Lil Tokyo Reporter. He also played GameKeeper (Mr. Chan) in the film RPG.

His stage credits include originating roles in Ken Narasaki's No-No Boy, Chay Yew’s A Language of Their Own (LA Weekly Theater Award for Ensemble Performance, shared with Noel Alumit, Anthony David and Dennis Dun) at Celebration Theatre, Laurence Yep's Dragonwings at Berkeley Repertory Theatre – on Tour and at Zellerbach Playhouse, (reprised at Intiman Playhouse by Seattle Children's Theatre, Alliance Theatre Company in Atlanta, and Syracuse Stage), Tim Toyama's Visas and Virtue, at the Road Theatre Company, and Wakako Yamauchi's The Memento at East West Players.

== Director ==
Tashima won an Academy Award for Live Action Short Film with producer Chris Donahue, for Visas and Virtue (1997), which he directed, co-wrote (adapting the one-act play by Toyama), and starred in. To produce Visas and Virtue, he co-founded Cedar Grove Productions in 1996, with Toyama and Donahue.

Tashima directed, co-wrote and acted in Day of Independence (2003), a half-hour television special for PBS, produced by Lisa Onodera, which received a Regional Emmy Nomination from the NATAS San Francisco/Northern California Chapter, in the category of Historical/Cultural — Program/Special.

His stage directing credits include the world premiere of Dan Kwong's Be Like Water produced by East West Players, in association with Cedar Grove OnStage, in September 2008. He has directed several shows with the Grateful Crane Ensemble, including the world premiere of Soji Kashiwagi's Nihonmachi: The Place To Be, presented in San Francisco in 2006.

== Professional ==
Tashima is a member of the Academy of Motion Picture Arts and Sciences, in the Short Films Branch, and was elected Branch Governor in June, 2024. He belongs to the Directors Guild of America, Screen Actors Guild, American Federation of Television and Radio Artists, Actors' Equity Association and the Stage Directors and Choreographers Society.

He is also a stage set designer. He won a 1995 Ovation Award for Best Set Design in a Smaller Theater, for Sweeney Todd, and a 1992 Drama-Logue Award for Scenic Design (shared with Christopher Komuro) for Into The Woods, both at East West Players.

Tashima served as producer of the 1990 world premiere of Maui, December 7, 1941, a play by Jon Shirota, based on his novel, "Lucky Come Hawaii." Directed by Mako, the World War II comedy was presented at the InnerCity Cultural Center in Los Angeles, and received a nomination from the LA Weekly, for "Production of the Year."

== Community ==
Honors:

- "Japanese American of the Biennium" (shared with Toyama) – Presented by National JACL
- "Bridge Builder" Asian American Leadership Award – Presented by A Magazine, New York, NY
- Humanitarian Award – Presented by The "1939" Club, Los Angeles CA
- Visionary Award (on behalf of Cedar Grove Productions) – Presented by East West Players, Los Angeles CA
- Community Award – Presented by the Japanese American Service Committee, Chicago IL
- Special Recognition Award – Presented by the Japanese American Cultural & Community Center, Los Angeles CA
