= Chris Donahue (producer) =

American film and television producer

- Born: John Christopher Donahue
- Education: Loyola University New Orleans (BA); Jesuit School of Theology (MDiv, ThM); American Film Institute (MFA)
- Occupations: film producer; television producer
- Years active: 1996–present
- Organizations: Cedar Grove Productions (1996–2001); Loyola Marymount University (1997–2002); American Film Institute (1998–2000, 2004–05); Apollo Cinema (2000–03); Humanitas (2001–06); Shephard/Robin (2006–10); Warner Horizon Television (2010–14); Paulist Productions (2014–18); West Main Street Productions (2018–Current)
- Notable work: Visas and Virtue (1997); Be Good, Smile Pretty (2003); Longmire (2012–14)
- Board member of: Humanitas
- Awards: Academy Award for Live Action Short Film, 1998; National Emmy for Best Documentary, 2004
- Website: chrisdonahue.info

John Christopher Donahue is an American film and television producer. He began his career as a producer in television news and documentaries, then transitioned to narrative film and television at the American Film Institute. He has won numerous awards, including an Academy Award for Live Action Short Film for producing Visas and Virtue (1998), and an Emmy for his documentary Be Good, Smile Pretty (2003).

Donahue founded West Main Street Productions, and is a member of the Academy of Motion Picture Arts and Sciences, the Academy of Television Arts and Sciences, and the Producers Guild of America. He is a board member for the Humanitas Prize.

== Early life and education ==
Donahue was born in Dallas, Texas. Donahue attended Jesuit College Preparatory School of Dallas. He did undergraduate studies at Loyola University New Orleans, where he received a bachelor's degree in Communications. He holds graduate degrees from the American Film Institute (MFA) and the Jesuit School of Theology at Berkeley (M.Div. and Th.M.).

One of the films he cited as early influences that he grew up watching include Butch Cassidy and the Sundance Kid. The first film he ever watched in a theater was Robert Wise's film The Sound of Music.

== Career ==
Donahue's first professional job was at WWL-TV in New Orleans. Donahue received two consecutive New Orleans Press Club Awards, for the documentaries Russia: A Prison of Nations and Nicaragua: A Land Divided. Through PBS affiliate work he was selected as a Corporation for Public Broadcasting Fellow at WGBH in Boston. He produced hundreds of hours of local news, documentary, and children's television in New Orleans before moving to Los Angeles in 1991 to attend the American Film Institute (AFI).

After AFI, he worked for Paulist Productions as the Director of Development and was a co-producer on Entertaining Angels: The Dorothy Day Story (1996) written by John Wells, starring Moira Kelly and Martin Sheen. In 1998 he produced the short Visas and Virtue (1997), a narrative depiction of Holocaust rescuer Chiune Sugihara. For this he received an Academy Award for Live Action Short Film (shared with director Chris Tashima). He co-founded Cedar Grove Productions in 1996 with Tashima and playwright Tim Toyama to produce the short film. Donahue was also the Executive Producer of the drama Day of Independence (2003) with Cedar Grove Productions.

Donahue produced the 2000 feature, Straight Right and won an Emmy Award for the documentary, Be Good, Smile Pretty (2003), broadcast on the PBS series, Independent Lens.

From 2000 to 2006, Donahue served as the first full-time Executive Director for the Humanitas Prize, an annual writer's award that celebrates films and television shows that not only entertain, but also enrich the viewing public.

From 2006 to 2010, Donahue served as executive vice-president at the Shephard/Robin Company, creators of the TNT television drama, The Closer and FX's Nip/Tuck. Donahue served as producer on the Lifetime Television series, State of Mind starring Lili Taylor as well as the TNT drama, Trust Me starring Eric McCormack, Tom Cavanagh, and Monica Potter.

In 2011, Donahue produced the award-winning A&E series Longmire for Warner Brothers Television, producing every episode of season 1 through 3. The western crime drama lasted for 6 seasons, and was based on Walt Longmire, the dedicated and unflappable sheriff of Absaroka County, Wyoming, starring Robert Taylor, Lou Diamond Phillips, and Katee Sackhoff. Longmire won several awards including a Key Art Award in 2013, a Red Nation Film Award of Excellence in 2013, and a Prism Award in 2014. The pilot was also nominated for Best Television Episode Teleplay in 2013 at the Edgar Allan Poe Awards.

Donahue was president of Paulist Productions from July 2014 to 2018, where he sourced, negotiated, and established a multi-million dollar, three picture co-financing and co-production arrangement with MarVista Entertainment. Some of his notably films at Paulist were Miracle Maker (2015), The Dating Project (2018), and Every Other Holiday (2018). While there he sourced and performed due diligence on potential internet and digital media investments, including streaming video platforms and other early- and mid-stage digital media companies.

Most recently, Donahue was the Executive Producer of Caffeine & Gasoline: Evolution of the American Rocker (2020), a documentary about the history of the rocker and cafe clubs that started the movement in East London, speaking with Northern Rockers and Ace Cafe patrons. Filmmaker Steven 'Fenix' Maes and his crew spent two years documenting vintage bike enthusiasts, custom bike builders, and cafe racer clubs around the United States, searching for what it means to be an American Rocker.

Donahue works as a consultant and coach, and has worked with filmmakers and investors at every stage of production.

Donahue is a member of numerous boards, organizations, and committees within the entertainment industry, such as:

- Academy of Motion Pictures Arts & Sciences: Member, Grants & Scholars Committee, Student Academy Awards Judge
- Nicholls Fellowship, Judge
- The HUMANITAS Prize, board member
- Producers Guild of America, Member
- Academy of Television Arts & Sciences, Member
- University Film & Video Association, Member
- Society of Human Resource Managers, Member

In addition to his producing credits, Donahue has taught film courses at the American Film Institute, Chapman University, Loyola Marymount University, and UCLA. He has spoken on numerous panels at film festivals, and conducted workshops at leading universities and colleges. His teaching competencies include: The Business of Media, Directing, Documentaries, Film and Television Production, and Screenwriting.

His love for documentaries has him returning to the form often, and his current interests have him exploring themes in Artificial Intelligence, Creativity, Immersive Storytelling (VR, AR, 360), and Social Impact Entertainment.

== Filmography (producer) ==
Filmography
Title	Role	Type	Year
Caffeine & Gasoline	Executive Producer	Feature Documentary	2020
Every Other Holiday	Executive Producer	Feature Film	2018
The Dating Project	Executive Producer	Feature Documentary	2018
Little Women	Executive Producer	Feature Film	2018
Black Jack Pershing	Consulting Producer	Documentary	2017
A Journey to Golf's Past	Executive Producer	Feature Documentary	2017
CRY	Executive Producer	Pilot Script	2016
Miracle Maker	Executive Producer	Feature Film	2015
He Knows My Name	Executive Producer	Short Film	2015
Longmire	Producer	One-Hour Drama	2011
Trust Me	Producer	One-Hour Drama	2009
State of Mind	Producer	One-Hour Drama	2007
Day of Independence	Executive Producer	Short Film	2003
Be Good, Smile Pretty	Executive Producer	One-Hour Documentary	2002
Inside the Writers Mind	Producer	Pilot Presentation	2002
Judas: Traitor or Friend	Consulting Producer	One-Hour Documentary	2001
Straight Right	Producer	Feature Film	2000
Visas and Virtue	Producer	Short Film	1998
Entertaining Angels	Co-Producer	Feature Film	1995

== Honors and awards ==
Donahue has won one Academy Award and one Emmy Award. He has also received the Crystal Heart award Heartland Film Festival, and an Alumni Service Award from the Jesuit College Preparatory School of Dallas.

Donahue received two consecutive New Orleans Press Club Awards, for the documentaries Russia: A Prison of Nations and Nicaragua: A Land Divided. Through PBS affiliate work he was selected as a Corporation for Public Broadcasting Fellow at WGBH in Boston.
