= Rea Tajiri =

Japanese American film director

Rea Tajiri is a Japanese American video artist, filmmaker, and screenwriter, known for her personal essay film History and Memory: For Akiko and Takashige (1991). She is a 2025 Guggenheim Fellow in Film and Video and a USA Artists Fellowship recipient for 2025

== Early life ==
Tajiri was born in Rogers Park, Chicago, Illinois. Tajiri's father, Vincent Tajiri, was the founding photo editor for Playboy Magazine. Her uncle, Shinkichi Tajiri, was a prominent sculptor who resided in the Netherlands.

Tajiri attend the California Institute of the Arts (CalArts) where she earned her BFA and MFA degrees in post-studio art. She moved to New York in 1979, where she interned for experimental theatre director Robert Wilson at his Byrd Hoffman Foundation.

== Career ==
Tajiri's video art has been included in the 1989, 1991, and 1993 Whitney Biennials. She has also been exhibited at The New Museum for Contemporary Art, The Museum of Modern Art, The Guggenheim Museum, The Walker Art Museum and the Pacific Film Archives. Tajiri is a 2015 recipient of the Pew Fellowship in the Arts.

History and Memory: For Akiko and Takashige (1991) was Tajiri's personal essay documentary about the Japanese American internment. It premiered at the 1991 Whitney Biennial and won the Distinguished Achievement Award from the International Documentary Association. It also was awarded a Special Jury Prize: "New Visions Category" at the San Francisco International Film Festival in 1992, and won "Best Experimental Video," Atlanta Film and Video Festival, 1992. In 1993 she made Yuri Kochiyama: Passion for Justice, a documentary about the Nikkei Japanese American human rights activist. Tajiri co-produced the documentary with Pat Saunders.

She partnered with Japanese Canadian author, Kerri Sakamoto, to write a coming-of-age story about a Japanese American girl in 1970s Chicago, resulting in Strawberry Fields. It was shot in 1994 with funding from CPB, NEA, and ITVS. The film stars Suzy Nakamura, James Sie, Chris Tashima and Takayo Fischer, and was completed in 1997, screening at the San Francisco International Asian American Film Festival and the Los Angeles Film Festival. Strawberry Fields received a European premier at the Venice International Film Festival and won the Grand Prix at the Fukuoka Asian Film Festival.

Tajiri is a Professor in the Department Temple of Theater Film and Media Arts at Temple University where she teaches documentary production. Tajiri's 2022 documentary feature entitled Wisdom Gone Wild, details her sixteen-year journey as a caregiver for her mother who had dementia premiered at the Blackstar Film Festival where it won two awards. The film received a national broadcast on Season 36 of the Emmy-Award winning PBS Series POV in 2023. To date Wisdom Gone Wild has won seven awards.

== Film characteristics ==
=== Metanarrative ===
Tajiri is credited as a documentary filmmaker for weaving together different narratives, taking from found footage but also her own history and experiences.

=== Dramatic Fiction ===
Directed by Rea Tajiri, '"Strawberry Fields" doesn't follow a straight narrative line. Instead, Tajiri opts for graceful and dreamlike forays into the collective memory of war-era Japanese Americans. By showing the audience grainy photos and films of a world that Irene can never know, director Tajiri heightens the sense of quest in this enigmatic film." Lynn Voedisch Chicago Sun Times

=== Techniques ===
"Tajiri often focuses her inquiry on the representation of Asian-Americans in popular media. In Off Limits (1988), she critiques Hollywood's portrayal of the Vietnam War and Vietnamese people, juxtaposing fragments from Easy Rider with her own text to give voice to a Vietnamese character. In History and Memory (1990), Tajiri examines the construction of history and the manipulation of collective memory through a powerful pastiche of personal reminiscences and mass media images of the internment of Japanese-Americans during World War II." Electronic Art Intermix

=== History and Memory ===
An experimental film which reflects the memory of Tajiri's mother of the war period which she lived in. The plot is displayed through pieces of memory and known family history. Tajiri presents the film in four different parts: Events that happen in front of the camera, events that are restaged, events that are told through the memory of character conversation, and events that are known to have happened but not shown at all. As the narrator of this documentary, Tajiri uses text and verbal communication with her audience in order to enhance the purpose of the memory or images she gives to her audience. Through this film Tajiri has highlighted the absence of Japanese Americans among filmmaking. By upholding whatever deconstructed history and memory she may have of her family's experience, Tajiri is praised for bringing attention to the culture of her family's past. Tajiri is also known to bring attention to a topic by using absence to declare presence. In History and Memory, absent characters share a significant presence since their memory is so vital to the film's message. This ability to highlight a character, topic, or event that is absent without confusion or misunderstanding is difficult to achieve for a filmmaker, but Tajiri certainly succeeds in doing so (Streamas). This documentary ultimately awarded Tajiri with the Distinguished Achievement Award from the International Documentary association and a Special Jury Award from the San Francisco International Film Festival (Dorsey). Tajiri's way of filming is most recognized in History and Memory where she distorts the camera in order to show the recollection of memory.

=== Strawberry Fields ===
Strawberry Fields was produced by Open City Films and ITVS. It was first premiered in Europe at the Venice International Film Festival and the film also was the recipient of the Grand Prix at the Fukuoka Asian Film Festival (Dorsey).

Tajiri focuses on the recognition of the Asian American identity in her films, which is different than the Asian American culture. Tajiri goes against societal norms in Strawberry Fields, where protagonist Irene, a third generation Japanese American woman, publicly flaunts her inner rage. In the majority of Tajiri's filmmaking she is constantly bringing attention to societal issues, like in History and Memory, where she highlights Asian Americans, Latinos, or Black people not being able to immerse themselves within the white American population shank.

== Legacy ==
Her work is studied as part of the curriculum in many University's documentary and women's cinema programs. Tajiri brought attention to identity within filmmaking, displaying cultural tensions and curiosities in order to educate her audience through the story she is telling within specific films.

== Filmography ==
=== Director ===
- Hitchcock Trilogy 1987
- Off Limits 1988
- History and Memory: For Akiko and Takashige 1992
- Yuri Kochiyama: Passion for Justice 1993
- Strawberry Fields 1997
- Little Murders 1999
- Aloha 2000
- Lordville 2014
- "Wisdom Gone Wild" 2022

=== Producer ===
- Strawberry Fields 1997
- Yuri Kochiyama: Passion for Justice 1999

=== Writer ===
- Strawberry Fields 1997

=== Actress ===
- Robot Stories 2003

== Awards ==
- 1989 NEA Visual Arts Fellowship
- 1990 NEA Production Grant
- 1992 International Documentary Association, Distinguished Achievement Award – History and Memory
- 1992 San Francisco International Film Festival, Special Jury Award: New Visions Category -- "History and Memory"
- 1992 Atlanta Film & Video Festival, Best Experimental Video -- "History and Memory"
- 1993 NEA Visual Arts Fellowship
- 1994 NEA Production Grant
- 1998 Fukuoka Asian Film Festival, Grand Prix – Strawberry Fields
- 1992 Rockefeller Media Fellowship
- 1999 Rockefeller Media Fellowship
- 2000 New York Foundation for the Arts
- 2001 Smack Mellon Residency
- 2003 MacDowell Colony Residency
- 2015 Pew Fellowship in the Arts
- 2022 MacDowell Colony Residency
- 2023 Chicken & Egg Award
- 2025 USA Artist's Fellowship
- 2025 Guggenheim Fellowship
- 2026 Anonymous Was A Woman Grant
