= Tim Toyama =

Japanese American playwright and producer (born 1952)

- Born: April 28, 1952 (age 74); Chicago, Illinois, United States
- Education: California State University, Northridge
- Occupations: Playwright producer

Tim Toyama (born April 28, 1952 in Chicago, Illinois) is a playwright and producer. He is Sansei (third-generation Japanese American) living in Los Angeles, California. He is co-founder of the Asian American media company Cedar Grove Productions, and its sister Asian-American theatre company, Cedar Grove OnStage. He attended California State University, Northridge (CSUN) as an English major.

== Productions ==
His plays have been produced at The Complex in Los Angeles and The Road Theatre Company at the Lankershim Arts Center in North Hollywood, California. His best-known work is Visas and Virtue, which is based on the story of Holocaust rescuer Chiune "Sempo" Sugihara, who was known as "The Japanese Schindler". Adapted into a short film by actor-director Chris Tashima, the 26-minute drama received the Academy Award for Live Action Short Film in 1998.

In addition to serving as the film's executive producer, Toyama co-founded Cedar Grove Productions with Tashima and producer Chris Donahue. By producing professional dramatic films intended for entertainment and educational use, Cedar Grove Productions has brought forth Asian American stories, history and issues which were previously either glossed over in textbooks or ignored by the mainstream media. Cedar Grove Productions "remains dedicated to developing and producing projects that boldly defy mainstream Hollywood by giving Asian Americans the spotlight on stage, and the close-up on screen."

Toyama teamed up with Aaron Woolfolk to write Bronzeville, a play that centers around Los Angeles's Little Tokyo district during World War II, where African Americans became the primary residents after the internment of Japanese Americans. The play premiered worldwide in April 2009, produced by the Robey Theatre Company in association with the Los Angeles Theatre Center. In October 2009, the play was nominated for an Ovation Award for Original Playwriting.

Toyama's play Independence Day was also adapted to the screen by Cedar Grove Productions as a half-hour television special for PBS. Inspired by his father "Zip" Toyama's World War II experience in a U.S. internment camp for Japanese Americans, Day of Independence received a Regional Emmy Nomination in 2006 from the NATAS Northern California Chapter, in the category of Historical/Cultural - Program/Special. Toyama co-wrote the screenplay and served as executive producer on the film. In addition to its PBS broadcast, the film has been shown at over sixty international film and video festivals and has garnered twenty-five awards.

Toyama is working on several new plays, including Memorial Day, which is about the 100th/442nd, the segregated Japanese American fighting unit of World War II, and Yuri and Malcolm X, about the life of Nisei civil rights activist Yuri Kochiyama and her friendship with Malcolm X.

== Achievements ==
He has served on the Artistic Board at The Road Theatre Company as well as the Literary Committee at East West Players. He has been honored with awards from various community organizations, including "Japanese American of the Biennium" awarded by the National JACL, a Community Award from the Japanese American Service Committee of Chicago, Special Recognition from the Japanese American Cultural and Community Center of Los Angeles, a Visionary Award from East West Players, and a Humanitarian Award from The 1939 Club, a Holocaust Survivors' organization. In July 2008 Toyama received the Ruby Yoshino Schaar Playwright Award presented by the New York/National JACL for his play Yuri and Malcolm X.

== Trivia ==
- He has made cameo appearances in several independent films including Day of Independence, Stand Up for Justice, The First Battle, Americanese, American Zombie and Mamo's Weeds.
