= American Indian Dance Theatre =

Indigenous North American performing arts company

American Indian Dance Theatre is a professional performing arts company presenting the dances and songs of Native Americans in the United States and the First Nations of Canada.

== History ==
The group was founded in 1987 with Hanay Geiogamah as director and Barbara Schwei as producer. Raoul Trujillo served as choreographer and co-director. The creation of the company resulted from the success of a previous production led by Geiogamah and Schwei the previous year. The group includes members from many different tribal backgrounds. Their first performance was in Washington, D.C. at Ford's Theater. It made its New York City debut in 1989 in Manhattan's Joyce Theater. They tour to various locations including the United States, Canada, Europe, Asia, North Africa, and the Middle East.

In 2006, American Indian Dance Theater joined a multicultural consortium called the "Cultural Roundtable" at the Los Angeles Theatre Center in order to attract various audiences in the downtown Los Angeles area. Other performance groups belonging to the Cultural Roundtable include the Latino Theater Company, Playwrights' Arena, Robey Theatre Company, Culture Clash and Cedar Grove OnStage.

== Features ==
The company aims to tackle stereotypes and allow for an understanding of their culture through different platforms, such as live performances, television, and films. Their performances include both ceremonial and seasonal dances that all tell stories of the Native American heritage. Geiogamah noted in one interview that the performances act in opposition to Hollywood depictions and inaccurate media, ensuring the dances are authentic, but also educational. He also created a system to categorize the different types of American Indian dances that stem from 430 tribes in the U.S. A few examples of the tribes include the Zuni, Yakima, Warm Springs, Apache, Assiniboine, Navajo, Sioux, Cherokee, Cheyenne, Chippewa, Comanche, Southern Ute, Cree, Creek, Crow, Kiowa, Hidatsa, and Delaware. Geiogamah researches and combines different elements of the dances to form new content while still keeping the authenticity and meaning of the originals alive.

These dances also involve music and costumes with a large focus on tradition. One distinct feature of this group is that the dancers involved originate from 20 different tribes. Within the performances, there are dancers, drummers, and singers, and there is large focus on details such as the animal masks, the traditional jewelry, and handmade feathered and beaded costumes.

== Performances ==
Some notable events include the Pillow debut performance in which the company collaborated with two Hawaiian groups in 1995 and 1998. Another includes performances with the titles "Eagle Dance" and "Hoop Dance" in which the stories of creation are told and communicated through the sign language of the Native peoples. The Eagle Dance tends to vary depending on the region in which it is performed, but the underlying theme of maturity and growth is still present within each. The Hoop Dance comes from a legend in which a man who was dying aspired to leave a mark on earth and was given the opportunity to obtain more hoops for every natural form he was able to recreate. Another notable dance performed by the American Indian Dance Theatre includes "The Warrior Prepares," which explains how the concept of warriors came to be.

== Recognition ==
The group has been nominated for both a Grammy and Emmy award. In 1993, they had an Emmy nomination in the category "Outstanding Children's Program."

== Influence ==
The company was mentioned as inspirations for other tribal dance groups, such as Indigenous Enterprise, due to their influential means of story-telling.

== Films ==
- American Indian Dance Theater. Vol. 1, Finding the Circle (1996). Originally produced in 1989 as a segment of the PBS television series Great Performances/Dance in America. A production of WNET/Thirteen in association with Tatge/Lasseur Productions, Inc. Directed by Merrill Brockway. Phoenix, Arizona: Canyon Records & Indian Arts. Presents a variety of Indian dances, performed on stage and at various international powwows. Includes Plains Indians' hoop, eagle, and Apache Crown Dances, the Zuni rainbow dance, powwow dances (grass, men's traditional and fancy, women's fancy shawl), and Plains snake and buffalo dances.
- American Indian Dance Theater (1996). Dances for the New Generations. Produced in 1993 for PBS Great Performances/Dance in America. Produced by Barbara Schwei and Hanay Geiogamah, in association with Phil Lucas Productions. Directed by Phil Lucas and Hanay Geiogamah. Performances of Native American Indian dances performed with traditional drums and music. The dancers wear traditional native regalia and makeup, and perform in various venues, including a powwow. Includes dances from the Northwest (Makah and Kwakiutl), Northeast (Seneca and Penobscot), and Plains Indians.
