= Jose Luis Valenzuela =

American director

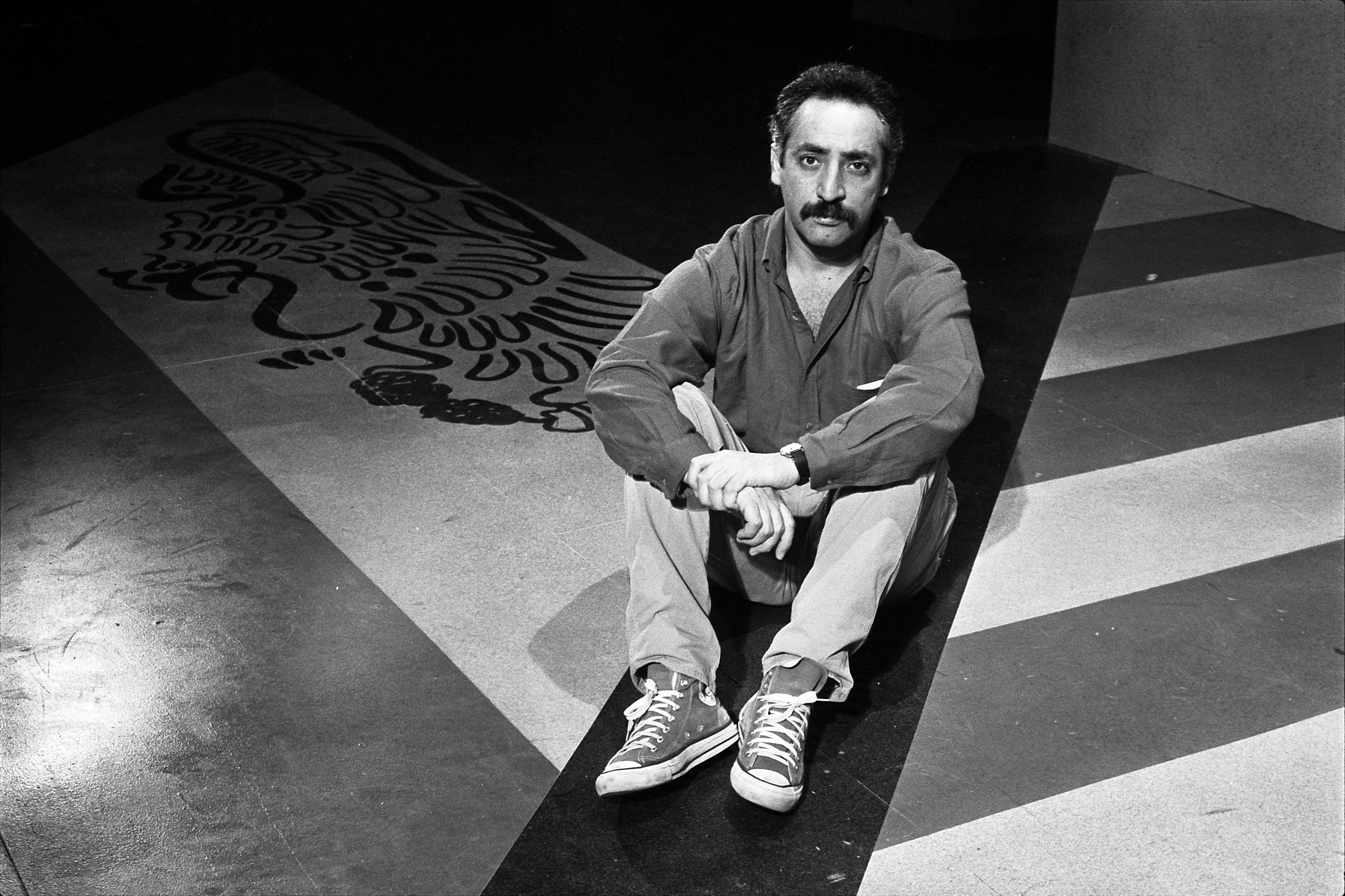
Valenzuela in 1987

José Luis Valenzuela is a theater and film director and emeritus distinguished professor at the UCLA School of Theater, Film and Television.

Valenzuela has directed theater plays, which were appreciated by critics. His theater plays were performed in the important regional theaters like Los Angeles Theatre Center, where he founded in 1985 Latino Theater Initiative and moved to the Mark Taper Forum in 1991.

His most recent works include, The Mother of Henry, Destiny of Desire, Dementia, A Mexican Trilogy: An American Story, La Olla, Premeditation, Solitude, La Victima and La Virgen de Guadalupe, Dios Inantzin. He has directed productions at the Oregon Shakespeare Festival and Arena Stage.

His international plays include Henrik Ibsen's Peer Gynt at the Norland Theater in Norway and Manuel Puig's Kiss of Spider Woman at the National Theater of Norway.

Dementia won the 2003 GLAAD Media Award for the best Theater production in Los Angeles. He's of Mexican descent.
