= Sōji =

- Gender: Male

Origin
- Origin: Japanese
- Meaning: Different meanings depending on the kanji used

Sōji, Soji, Souji or Sohji (written: 総司, 惣司 or 荘司) is a masculine Japanese given name. Notable people with the name include:

== People ==
- Soji Kashiwagi (born 1962), American journalist and playwright
- Soji Shimada (島田 荘司; born 1948), Japanese writer
- Okita Sōji (沖田 総司; 1842 or 1844 – 1868), Japanese swordsman and Shinsengumi captain
- Sōji Yoshikawa (吉川 惣司; born 1947), Japanese anime director and screenwriter

== Fictional characters ==
- Soji Asha, from Star Trek: Picard
- Souji Seta, the protagonist's name in the manga adaptation of Persona 4
- Souji Tendou (天道 総司), fictional character from Kamen Rider Kabuto
- Souji "Soushi" Yukimi, fictional character from Soar High! Isami
