= Chantal Rodriguez =

American theatre scholar

Chantal Rodriguez is the Associate Dean of the Yale School of Drama and a scholar of Latino theater.

== Career ==
Rodriguez graduated from Santa Clara University in 2003 with a bachelor's degree in Theater Arts and Spanish Studies. In 2009, she received her doctorate from the University of California, Los Angeles in Theater and Performance Studies.

In 2009, Rodriguez became Programming Director and Literary Manager at the Latino Theater Company. She worked at the LTC for seven years. In 2016, Rodriguez was hired as the Assistant Dean at the Yale School of Drama and was promoted to Associate Dean in 2017. She oversaw student life matters, worked on equity, diversity, and inclusion initiatives, taught in the dramaturgy and dramatic criticism department, and served as the School's Title IX Coordinator.

Rodriguez is a member of the Advisory Committee for the Latinx Theatre Commons and also serves on the National Advisory Board for the 50 Playwrights Project. This initiative aims to promote the creations of Latino playwrights and foster conversations surrounding Latino art.

Rodriguez has worked as an adjunct lecturer at several universities, including UCLA, California Institute of the Arts, California State University, Northridge, Emerson College Los Angeles and Loyola Marymount University.

== Publications ==
The works of Rodriguez have been featured in several publications, including Theatre Journal, Latin American Theatre Review, e-misférica, and Theatre Research International. In 2019, she collaborated with Tom Sellar, the editor of Theater Magazine, to co-edit a special issue focused on Latino theater.

Rodriguez authored "The Latino Theatre Initiative/Center Theatre Group Papers, 1980-2005," a pioneering historical examination of the Latino Theatre Initiative at the Mark Taper Forum. This book, published in 2011 by the Chicano Studies Research Center at UCLA, aimed to broaden the academic discourse on Latino art and promote additional research in this area.

Rodriguez is also the co-editor of Encuentro: Latinx Performance for the New American Theater (2019), an anthology of plays from the 2014 Encuentro festival produced by the Latino Theater Company. Published by Northwestern University Press and co-edited with Trevor Boffone and Teresa Marrero, the anthology is meant to serve as a resource and features the works of six Latino playwrights from the Encuentro festival.

== Awards ==
Rodriguez received accolades for her scholarship on Latino theater. Her book, The Latino Theatre Initiative/Center Theatre Group Papers, 1980-2005 was nominated for three Latino Literacy Now International Book Awards. Moreover, she was recognized in 2011 as a Young Leader of Color by the Theater Communications Group, an award created to "gather groups of early-career theatre professionals of color from around the US at TCG’s National Conferences to engage in a dialogue about the new generation of leadership." Rodriguez was one of only 79 individuals recognized over eight years in the program.

In 2016, Rodriguez received the Rainbow Award from the Los Angeles Women's Theater Festival, an accolade presented to artists or individuals for their "diverse contributions in fostering non-traditional and multicultural theatre works." Moreover, in the same year, she was a finalist in the Richard E. Sherwood Award presented by the Center Theatre Group to individuals who are "extending frontiers, experimenting, challenging the theatrical norm, [and] finding new forms of artistic expression" in Los Angeles.
