= Cedar Grove OnStage =

American Theatre Arts Organisation

- Formation: 2006
- Type: Theatre group
- Purpose: Asian American theatre
- Location(s): The LATC 514 S. Spring St. Los Angeles, CA 90013
- Notable members: Chris Tashima, Artistic Director
- Website: CGO on MySpace

Cedar Grove OnStage is an Asian Pacific American theatre arts organization established in 2006, based in Los Angeles, co-founded by playwright Tim Toyama and actor/director Chris Tashima who serves as Artistic Director. It is a division of the entertainment company, Cedar Grove Productions and their focus is to develop, produce and present new and original Asian American theatre works.

== Background ==
=== Media company ===
In 1996, the independent media company Cedar Grove Productions was formed to produce the short film, Visas and Virtue (1997). The story focused on Holocaust rescuer Chiune “Sempo” Sugihara and the film won the Academy Award for Live Action Short Film at the 70th Academy Awards. The company takes its name from the literal translation of "Sugihara": sugi (Japanese: 杉) meaning cedar, and hara (Japanese: 原) meaning field or grove.

=== Theatre ===
Cedar Grove OnStage formed in 2006 when Cedar Grove Productions was invited to join the "Cultural Roundtable" at THE NEW LATC, a multicultural theatre arts consortium led by the Latino Theatre Company operating out of the Los Angeles Theatre Center facilities in downtown Los Angeles. The Latino Theatre Company formed the Cultural Roundtable to create culturally diverse programming for the City of Los Angeles. Performance groups belonging to the Cultural Roundtable include Cedar Grove OnStage, Culture Clash, Latino Theater Company, Playwrights' Arena, Robey Theatre Company, and American Indian Dance Theatre/Project HOOP.

== Production history ==
=== Mainstage production ===
- In September 2008, Cedar Grove OnStage worked in association with East West Players to produce the world premiere of Dan Kwong's Be Like Water, directed by Tashima, presented at the David Henry Hwang Theater at the Union Center for the Arts, in downtown Los Angeles' Little Tokyo.

=== Presentations ===
- April 2007 – 18 Mighty Mountain Warriors in Threat Condition: YELLOW at THE NEW LATC
- May 2008 – Cold Tofu in Edamame Nights at THE NEW LATC
- November 2008 – Dan Kwong in Its Great 2B American at THE NEW LATC
