= Strawberry Fields (1997 film) =

1997 American drama film

- DVD cover
- Directed by: Rea Tajiri
- Written by: Rea Tajiri; Kerri Sakamoto
- Produced by: Rea Tajiri; Jason Kliot; Hank Blumenthal
- Starring: Suzy Nakamura; James Sie; Reiko Matheiu; Heather Yoshimura; Marilyn Tokuda; Chris Tashima; Takayo Fischer
- Cinematography: Zachary Winestine
- Edited by: Steve Hamilton; James Lyons
- Music by: Bundy Brown; Sooyoung Park
- Distributed by: Vanguard Cinema (DVD)
- Release date: 1997
- Running time: 90 minutes
- Country: United States
- Language: English
- Budget: $360,000

Strawberry Fields is a 1997 independent feature film directed by Japanese American filmmaker Rea Tajiri and co-written by Tajiri and Japanese Canadian author Kerri Sakamoto.

== Plot ==
The story of the film centers on Irene Kawai, a Japanese American teenager in Chicago in the 1970s who is haunted by a photo of her grandfather she never knew standing by a barracks in a World War II internment camp for Japanese Americans. Prompted by visits from the ghost of Terri, her dead baby sister, Irene journeys with her boyfriend Luke on a road trip to Arizona, where the Poston War Relocation Center once stood, and where the photo of her grandfather was taken.

== Main cast ==
- Suzy Nakamura as Irene Kawai
- James Sie as Luke
- Heather Yoshimura as Terri
- Marilyn Tokuda as Alice
- Reiko Mathieu as Aura
- Chris Tashima as Mark
- Takayo Fischer as Takayo
- Peter Yoshida as Bill

== Production ==
Filmmaker Rea Tajiri, whose own grandparents and parents were interned, was inspired to make the project because of the lack of films that explored the effects of internment on internees' children.

“I felt at the time I began the project that there hadn’t been any films made that looked at the effect the internment had on the children of internees,” said the New York City-based filmmaker...“What was that moment like when you discovered your family was interned and how does that affect you? How does that make you look at your family after that point?”

Strawberry Fields was filmed in Chicago, Illinois, and in California. The film was completed in 1997, with the production lasting four years. It took another two years to get commercially released. The film received funding from CPB, NEA and ITVS.

== Release ==
It premiered at the San Francisco International Asian American Film Festival and was an Official Selection to the Venice Film Festival. It also screened at the Los Angeles Film Festival and won the Grand Prix at the Fukuoka Asian Film Festival. It was released on VHS and DVD by Vanguard Cinema.

== Reception ==
Critic Kevin Thomas of the Los Angeles Times called the film "very impressive...a tough-minded, idiosyncratic coming-of-age story". Variety was more critical, citing the film's "superficially sketched characters" and "hackneyed dialogue".
