= Derek Mio =

American film and television actor (born 1982)

- Born: 1982 (age 42–43); Huntington Beach, California, U.S.
- Occupation: Actor
- Years active: 2003–present
- Children: 1

Derek Mio (born 1982) is an American film and television actor who attended USC School of Cinematic Arts. He is a fourth generation Japanese American.

== Personal life ==
Mio was born in Huntington Beach, California and attended Huntington Beach High School. He attended the University of Southern California. He currently resides in Los Angeles.

== Acting career ==
Mio is known for portraying the recurring character Wade Matthews on the ABC Family series Greek and his portrayal of Glenn in the 2013 movie G.B.F. (Gay Best Friend). He had a role in the NBC series Day One, which was scheduled as a mid-season replacement in 2010. One of his first roles was playing the lead in the PBS Special Day of Independence. He also had a lead role in the indie feature Purity, directed by NaRhee Ahn. In 2014, he played the role of Elliot on the Geek & Sundry web-series Spooked. In 2019, Mio appeared in the World War II-themed second season of the AMC horror, drama anthology television series The Terror, playing the lead role of Chester Nakayama, the son of Japanese-born immigrants, who joins the army.
