= Hanay Geiogamah =

Native American playwright, TV & film producer, academic

- Born: 1945 (age 80–81); Lawton, Oklahoma, U.S.
- Education: Anadarko High School; University of Oklahoma; Indiana University
- Writing career
- Period: Contemporary
- Genres: Theater, Television, Movies, Dance
- Notable works: New Native American Drama: Three Plays; The Native Americans: Behind the Legends, Beyond the Myths (TBS); The Only Good Indian

Hanay Geiogamah (born 1945) is a Native American playwright, television and movie producer, and artistic director. He is a professor emeritus of the school of theater, film, and television at the University of California, Los Angeles. He also served as the director of the UCLA American Indian Studies Center from 2002 to 2009. Geiogamah was born in Oklahoma and is Kiowa and a Delaware Nation descendant. He is a widely known Native American playwright and one of the few Native American producers of both television and film in Hollywood.

== Early life ==
Geiogamah was born in Lawton, Oklahoma to a Kiowa father and a Delaware mother. He is an enrolled citizen of the Kiowa Indian Tribe of Oklahoma. He graduated from Anadarko High School and studied journalism at the University of Oklahoma. In 1979, he enrolled at Indiana University Bloomington. He graduated in 1980 with a bachelor's degree in theatre with a minor in journalism. Geiogamah also worked as the public affairs liaison for Commissioner of Indian Affairs Louis R. Bruce within the Bureau of Indian Affairs under President Richard Nixon.

== New York and theater ==
In late 1971, Geiogamah formed a theater company at La MaMa Experimental Theatre Club in New York City's East Village. La MaMa was the first all-Native repertory theater company in the country and changed its name to the Native American Theatre Ensemble in 1973 because "too many non-Indians who approached us during [our] tours [and] after performances … seemed unable to understand that we were real people, really alive and breathing, and that we were certified residents of the United States of America." Geiogamah's first play with the company was Body Indian, in 1972, followed by Coon Cons Coyote and Foghorn (1973).

In the 1970s, the Native American Theatre Ensemble toured throughout the United States and Germany. Students from the Institute of American Indian Arts in Santa Fe, New Mexico, accompanied the Ensemble on their February–April 1973 tour, during which they performed at the University of New Mexico, the College of Santa Fe, Haskell Indian Junior College, and the Smithsonian Institutution among other locations. Their music was presented in both the traditional and contemporary American Indian forms and songs were selected from the Plains, Eastern, Great Basin, Southwest, and Northwest Coast areas of Indian Country."

In 1980, the University of Oklahoma Press published Geiogamah's New Native American Drama: Three Plays. The Native American Theatre Ensemble produced Geiogamah's final play, 49 (1975) in 1982 at La MaMa.

Geiogamah later formed the widely acclaimed American Indian Dance Theatre, which gave its first public performance in 1987 with Geiogamah as director and Barbara Schwei as producer. The 24-member dance troupe represented about 18 Indian nations and toured both nationally and internationally. The dancers wore traditional costumes and the music was performed on traditional instruments made by the performers. The group made their New York City debut in 1989 in Manhattan's Joyce Theater. In 1990, the company was featured in PBS' Great Performances in the segment "The American Indian Dance Theater: Finding the Circle". The New York Times praised the performance saying that the "hallmark of this company is its authenticity" with "serious artists conveying basic facts of their lives and cultures." In 1993, the company was produced as a segment for Dances for the New Generations for the PBS television series Great Performances/Dance in America. Barbara Schwei and Hanay Geiogamah were producers and Phil Lucas and Geiogamah were directors. The program was nominated for a Primetime Emmy Award.

== Los Angeles, television, and film ==
Geiogamah served as producer and co-producer for the TBS multimedia project, The Native Americans: Behind the Legends, Beyond the Myths, aired on TNT from 1993 to 1996. The program was a series of fact-based historical dramas and publications. Geiogamah was co-producer on "The Broken Chain", which told the story of the Iroquois Confederacy during colonial times, and also for "Geronimo" (executive produced by Norman Jewison). In 1994, he was co-producer for "Lakota Woman: Return to Wounded Knee", and a year later he was co-producer for "Tecumseh", the story of the Shawnee leader who fought against the United States during Tecumseh's War and the War of 1812. In 1996, Geiogamah was producer for TNT's "Crazy Horse," about the war leader of the Oglala Lakota.

Geiogamah was co-executive producer for The Only Good Indian, an independently produced Western starring Cherokee actor Wes Studi. The movie premiered in 2009 at the Sundance Film Festival.

In 2010, Geiogamah joined co-host Robert Osborne of Turner Classic Movies for "Race in Hollywood: Native American Images on Film", a series that looked both positive and negative depictions of the Hollywood Indian.

Geiogamah serves on the National Film Preservation Board established in 1988 as an advisory body to the Librarian of Congress' National Film Registry. He was a founder and co-director of "Project HOOP" (Honoring Our Origins and Peoples), a national, multidisciplinary initiative to establish Native American theater in tribal colleges, Native communities, K-12 schools, and mainstream institutions.
