= Kerri Sakamoto =

Canadian novelist

Kerri Sakamoto (born 1960 in Toronto) is a Canadian novelist. Her novels commonly deal with the experience of Japanese Canadians.

Sakamoto's debut novel, The Electrical Field (1998), won the Commonwealth Writers Prize for Best First Book. It also won the Canada Council's biennial Canada-Japan Literary Award and was a finalist for a Governor General's Award. Her second novel, One Hundred Million Hearts, was published in 2003. Her books have been published in translation internationally. Her third novel, Floating City, was published by Penguin Random House in March 2018 and reviewed in Rungh magazine. The book was a finalist for the Toronto Book Award and earned her the Canada-Japan Literary Award for the second time. Sakamoto has given talks and readings and has participated in literary festivals in Canada, the United States, Europe and Asia.

Sakamoto is also known as a writer of screenplays and essays on visual art. She co-wrote (with director Rea Tajiri) the screenplay to the 1997 film, Strawberry Fields. She often collaborates with filmmakers as story editor or script editor on narrative, experimental and experimental documentary works. She has also written on visual art for museums and galleries in Canada and the United States, such as the Walter Phillips Gallery at the Banff Fine Arts Centre, the Whitney Museum of American Art, and the Honolulu Museum of Contemporary Art. In 2004, she contributed a catalogue essay on the work of Painters Eleven abstract expressionist Kazuo Nakamura for an exhibition at the Art Gallery of Ontario.

In 2005, Sakamoto was appointed the Barker Fairley Distinguished Visitor at the University of Toronto, and a member of the Toronto Arts Council in 2007. She has also served as a member of the Canadian jury at the Toronto international Film Festival.

In 2020 she was named the winner of the Writers' Trust Engel/Findley Award, a career achievement award for the recipient's body of work presented by the Writers' Trust of Canada.

== Bibliography ==
- The Electrical Field. Toronto: Knopf Canada, 1998.
- One Hundred Million Hearts. Toronto: Knopf Canada, 2003.
- Floating City. Toronto: Knopf Canada, 2018.
