= Day One (TV series) =

Unaired American TV pilot, produced 2009

- Starring: Julie Gonzalo; Derek Mio; Addison Timlin; Adam Campbell; Catherine Dent; David Lyons; Carly Pope; Thekla Reuten
- Composer: Trevor Morris
- Country of origin: United States
- Original language: English

Production
- Producer: Keenan Donahue

Day One was a planned NBC sci-fi television movie – originally a television series pilot – about apartment residents that survive an unknown worldwide cataclysm that destroys modern infrastructure. The movie/pilot was directed by Alex Graves, who previously directed the pilot episodes for the Fox television series Fringe and Journeyman. The show was originally expected to fill the Heroes time slot, in March 2010, after the 2010 Winter Olympics. It did not air at that time, with NBC never mentioning it again.

== Development ==
While originally intended to air on NBC midseason in the 2009–10 television season with a thirteen-episode order, it was reported on October 1, 2009, that the episode order had been reduced to four and would air as a mini-series. On January 10, 2010, it was announced that the order had been reduced to a pilot, which would air as a television movie. The NBC President of prime-time entertainment told the Television Critics Association that "it will be a pilot where you could see where it could go in series, but there will be a resolve at the end of the two hours. If the TV movie performs well the story may be continued." On May 16, 2010, Entertainment Weekly reported that the show would likely never air.

== Cast ==
- Julie Gonzalo as Kelly – the lead character, who is struggling with guilt over failing to save her fiancé's life.
- Derek Mio as a character caught in a hostage situation.
- Addison Timlin as a character caught in a hostage situation.
- Adam Campbell
- Catherine Dent
- David Lyons
- April Grace
- Carly Pope
- Thekla Reuten
- Xander Berkeley
