= History and Memory: For Akiko and Takashige =

- Directed by: Rea Tajiri
- Written by: Rea Tajiri
- Produced by: Rea Tajiri
- Starring: Noel Shaw and Sokhi Wagner
- Cinematography: George, Rea Tajiri
- Edited by: Rea Tajiri, Robert Burden
- Music by: Harry Warren, Al Dubin, Warner Bros.
- Production company: Akiko Productions
- Distributed by: Women Make Movies, Electronic Arts Intermix, Video Data Bank
- Release date: 1991
- Running time: 32 minutes
- Country: USA
- Language: English
- Budget: $25,000.00

History and Memory: For Akiko and Takashige is a 1991 documentary film by Rea Tajiri. In her film, Tajiri recalls her family's experience of the American internment of the Japanese during World War II.

History and Memory explores the story beyond the recorded history of the internment of the Japanese and Japanese Americans. The film premiered at the 1991 Whitney Biennial exhibition, and has since been screened over 250 times.

== The Film ==
Tajiri presents collective history from mainstream mediums, whilst presenting her own history through the memory of real people. To create her own personal history, Tajiri utilizes memory through her family members' experiences, along with photographs and 8mm footage. She also uses mainstream mediums such as, newsreels, Hollywood feature film, and government propaganda.

Caryn James, wrote in The New York Times that "Tajiri approaches her subject like a poet. She weaves together images and allows them to enrich one another in skewed and subtle ways as their resonances slowly emerge."

== Awards ==
- 1991: Distinguished Achievement Award from the International Documentary Association (Whitney Biennial, World Premiere)
- 1992: Special Jury Prize: "New Visions Category" (San Francisco International Film Festival)
- 1992: Best Experimental Video (Atlanta Film and Video Festival)
- Named one of the Top 100 American Films by Women Directors
