= Day of Independence =

- poster design: Dennis Mukai
- Directed by: Chris Tashima
- Written by: Chris Tashima; Tim Toyama
- Based on: Independence Day by Tim Toyama
- Produced by: Lisa Onodera
- Starring: Derek Mio; Marcus Toji; Alan Muraoka; Keiko Kawashima; Gina Hiraizumi; Chris Tashima
- Music by: Scott Nagatani
- Release date: September 26, 2003
- Running time: 27 minutes
- Country: United States
- Language: English

Day of Independence is a 2003 short film, broadcast in 2005 as a half-hour PBS television special. It is a drama, set during the Japanese American internment of World War II, produced by Cedar Grove Productions with Visual Communications as fiscal sponsor.

== Plot ==
Set in a relocation camp in 1943, "Day of Independence" tells the story of a young baseball player facing the tragic circumstances of the internment of 110,000 Americans of Japanese ancestry during World War II. The narrative follows a family torn apart by forced and unjust incarceration, highlighting a father's decision that challenges his son. Ultimately, the story unfolds with the son's triumph through courage, sacrifice, and the backdrop of the All-American game of baseball.

== Cast ==
- Derek Mio as Zip
- Marcus Toji as Hog
- Alan Muraoka as Father
- Keiko Kawashima as Mother
- Chris Tashima as The Umpire

(In order of appearance)

- Dean Komure as Spectator
- Lisa Joe as Frances ("National Anthem" singer)
- Diana Toshiko as Betty
- Sarah Chang as Sadie
- Julie Tofukuji as Mimi
- Ulysses Lee as Tad
- Jonathan Okui as Satch
- Gina Hiraizumi as Rose

== History ==
The story of the film is based on playwright and executive producer Tim Toyama's own father's World War II experience. During the war, Toyama's father, whose nickname was Zip, was sent along with his entire family to a U.S. internment camp for Japanese Americans. Zip's Issei (Japanese immigrant) father fell ill and elected to return to Japan, along with Zip's mother, on a prisoner exchange ship, called the MS Gripsholm. However, the parents told Zip that as an American, he should remain in the U.S.

== Background ==
Toyama wrote a play based on his family history, Independence Day. He and director Chris Tashima then adapted the play into a short film, which was produced by Lisa Onodera. The film was shot in 6 days, in Stockton, California and in Los Angeles. It was completed in 2003 and played in over 70 film and video festivals and competitions, winning 25 awards. Following its broadcast premiere on KHET/PBS Hawai'i on May 12, 2005, the film received a Regional Emmy nomination, from the NATAS San Francisco/Northern California Chapter (which includes Hawaii), in the category of Historical/Cultural – Program/Special.

== Awards ==
(partial list)

- Emmy Nomination - 35th Northern California Emmy Awards
- CINE Golden Eagle
- Platinum Best of Show - Aurora Awards
- Accolade Award of Excellence, Short Film
- Best Short - Stony Brook Film Festival
- Best Narrative Short - Tambay Film & Video Festival
- "Slate" Award, Best Short - California Independent Film Festival
- Best Short Film - Houston Multicultural Independent Film Festival
- Gold / 1st Prize - Crested Butte Reel Fest
- Audience Award, Best Drama - Marco Island Film Festival

== Trivia ==
- Performance artist Dan Kwong, who is also a baseball player, coached lead actor Derek Mio in old-style pitching form.
- Lisa Joe's character, "Frances" (who sings the National Anthem at the ballgame and later conducts a choir rehearsal), was named in honor of Joe's mother, Frances Sue Okabe, a well known Nisei singer and music teacher. Okabe was interned at the Minidoka internment camp as a teenager, where she was known for her singing. Joe provided the singing voice on the soundtrack as well, which was recorded on Mother's Day just after her mother died from cancer.
- During one of the montage sequences of "camp life," there is a painter standing by an easel, who is portrayed by playwright Tim Toyama, who stepped in at the last moment when the person cast to play the part didn't show up for filming.
- The scene depicting the choir rehearsal has un-credited cameo appearances by noted actors Tamlyn Tomita, Emily Kuroda, Sab Shimono and Greg Watanabe who are friends of the director.

== See also ==
- List of baseball films
