= Apache Crown Dance =

Apache ceremonial dance of protection

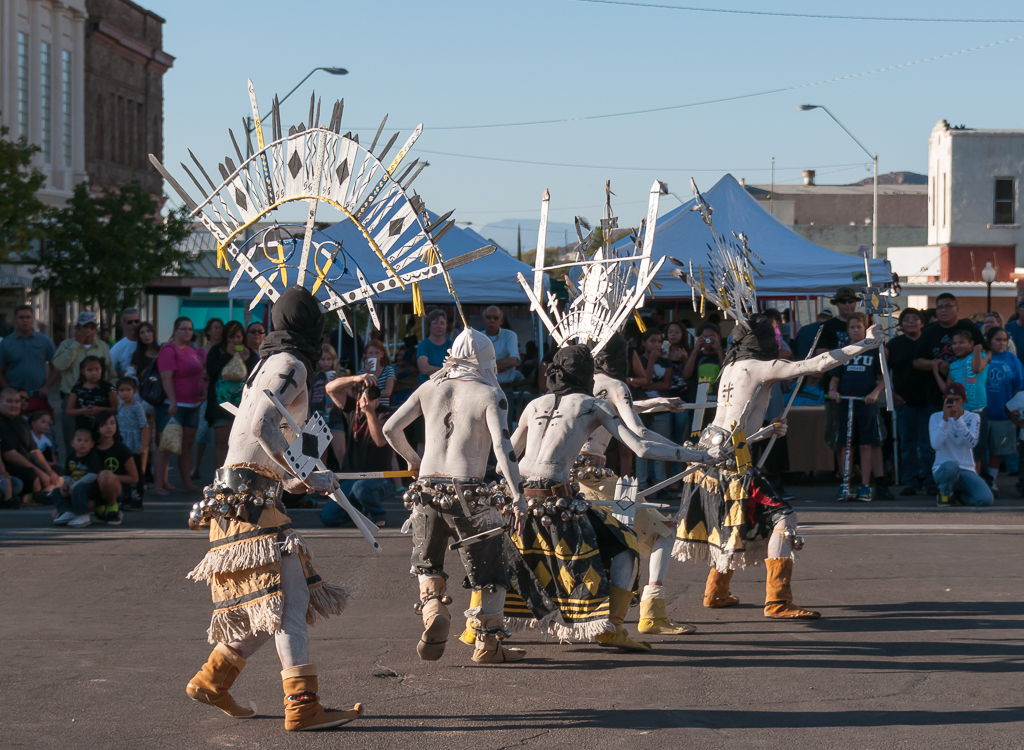
Dancers performing the Gaan Dance

Apache Crown Dance or Gaan Dance (also called Mountain Spirit, Crown Dance, Devil Dance) is an Apache ceremonial dance that is intended to protect the community from disease and enemies. Dancers became "the embodiment of the Mountain Spirits (the Gaan)"; they wear special masks and wands during the dance. The dance is performed by a group of five members, one of them a "clown", each having his specific role. The dance is performed "on the final night of the Sunrise Dance ceremony". The dance is described as following:

The Gaan dancers chant and keep beat with the same dance step as the girl, while in motion they lead the participant guests about the plaza. Eventually the girl follows the "clown" Gaan around the plaza and the guests fall in line after her. Upon returning to her original position, the Gaan surround the girl. The "clown" holds a mixture of ochre and corn pollen that is sprinkled or brushed over the girl by the other Gaan. Any remaining pollen may be emptied from the basket over her head and body. The Gaan bring a powerful spirituality to the ceremony as the Apache girl is transformed and attains womanhood.

== History ==
Gaan dancers dance to songs, opening of the first one says:

I, the Crown Dancer,
I come down
To the holy place
To the earth

Each Apache community has their own version of gaan history; they are usually told in the night before the ceremony or in the winter to instruct the children. It can be called "The Man Who Became a Gaan".

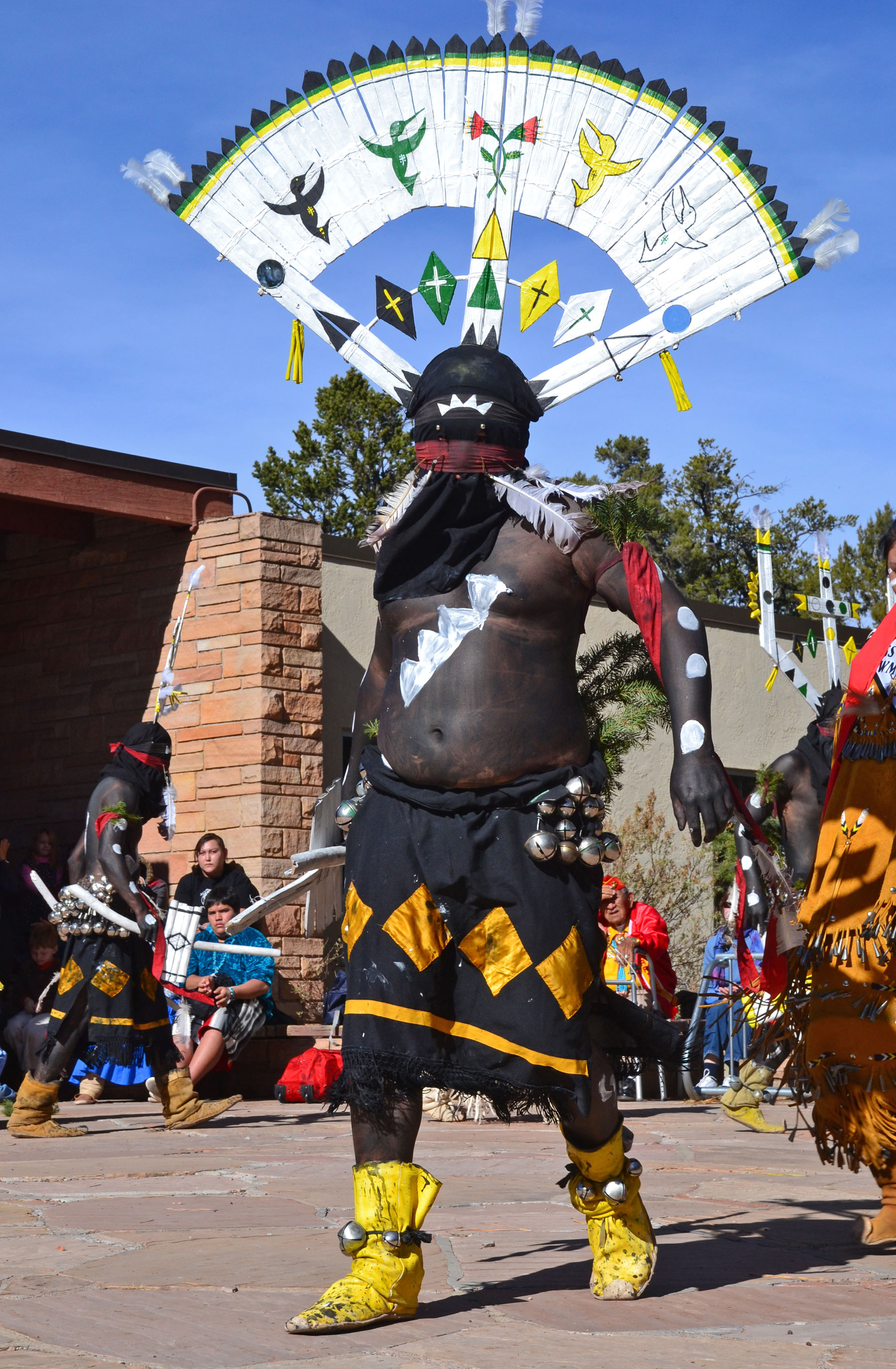

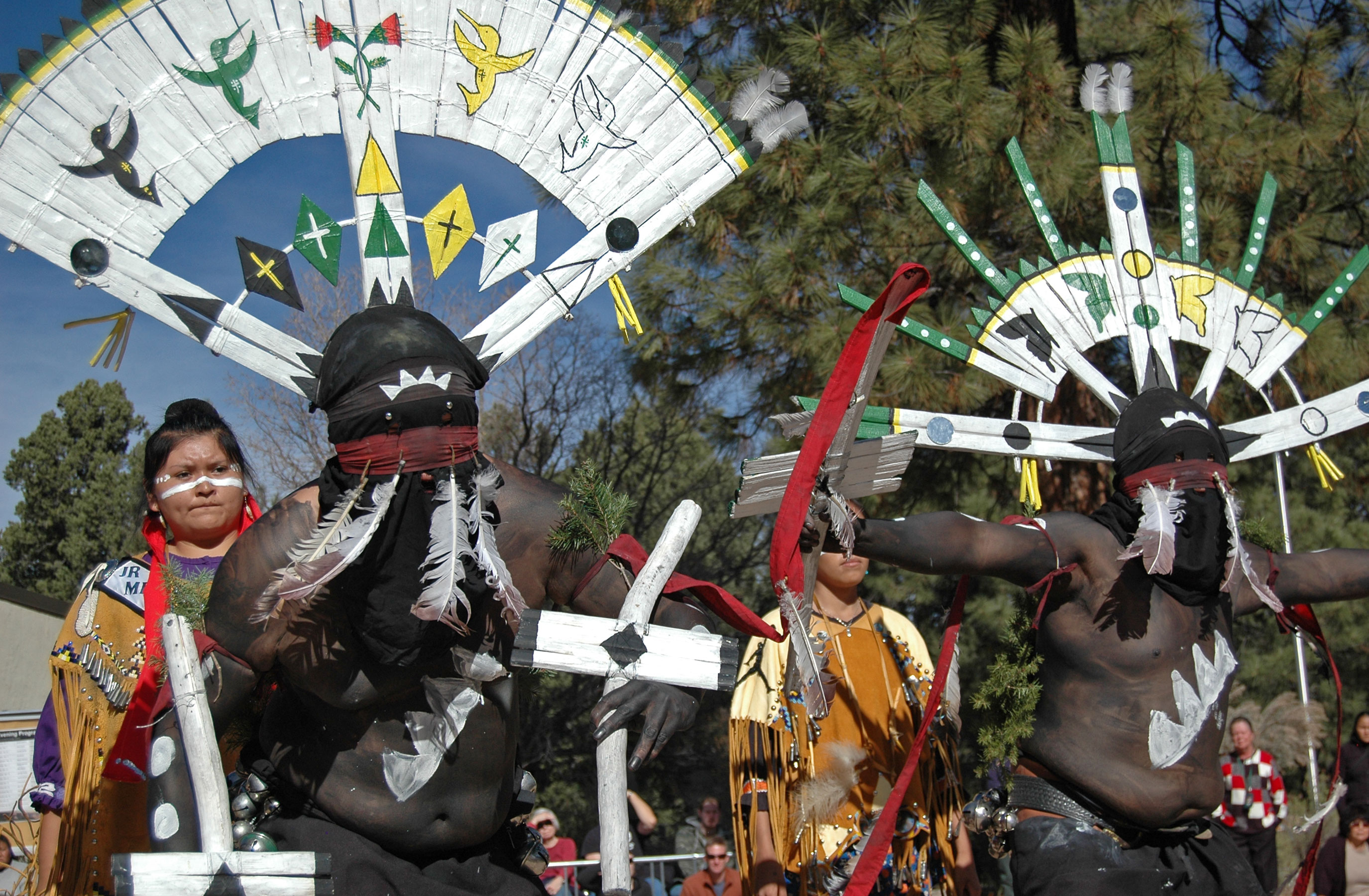

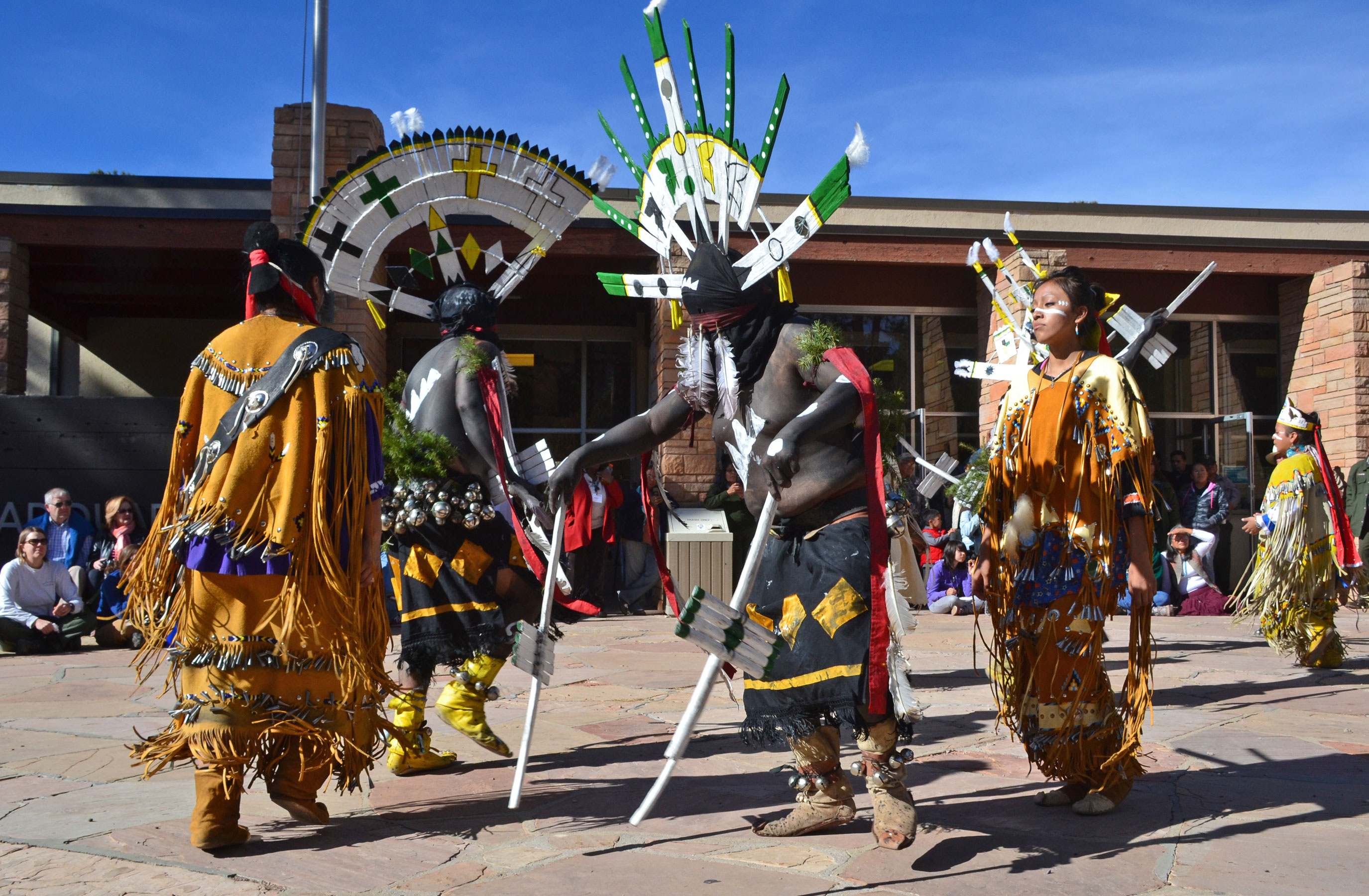

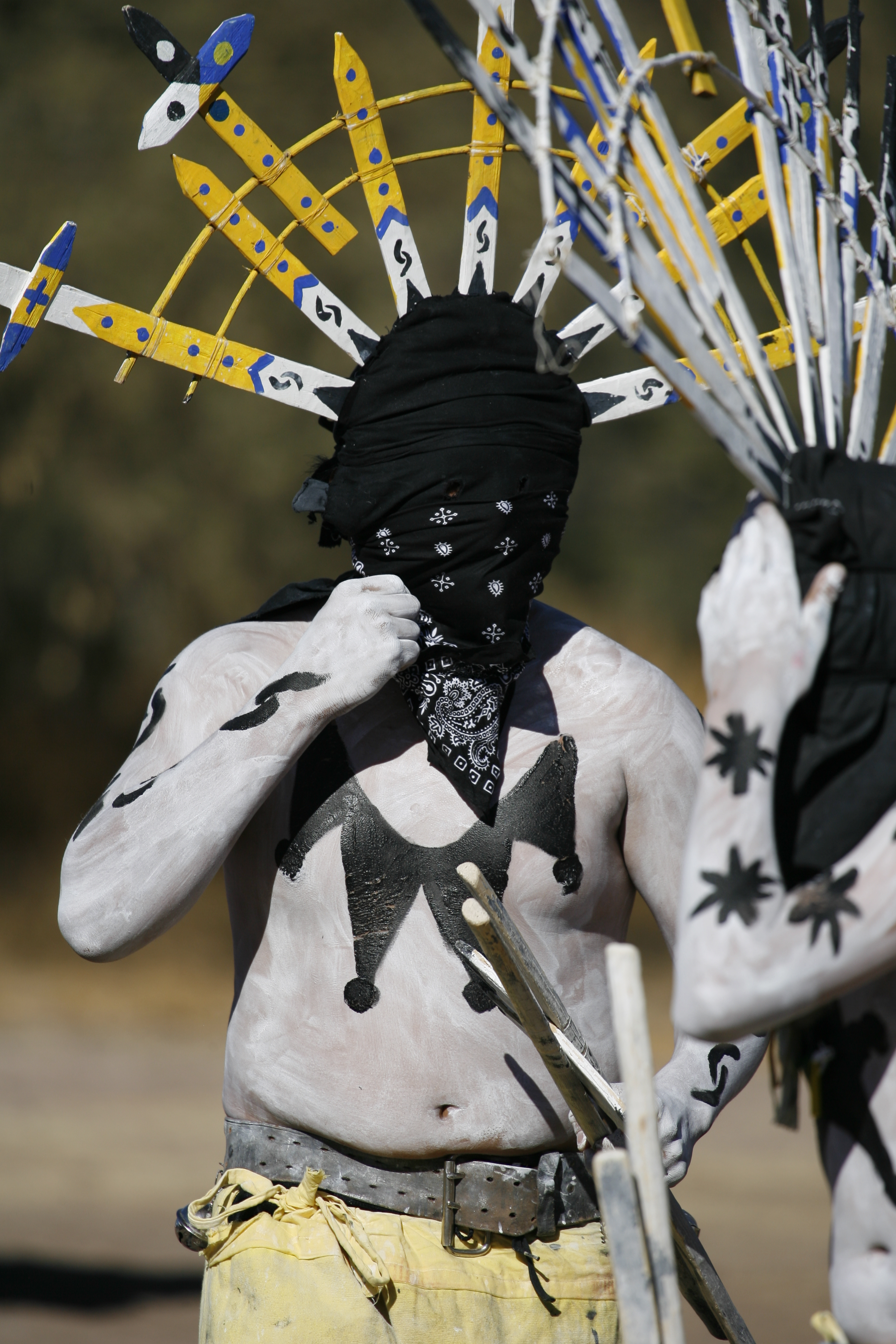

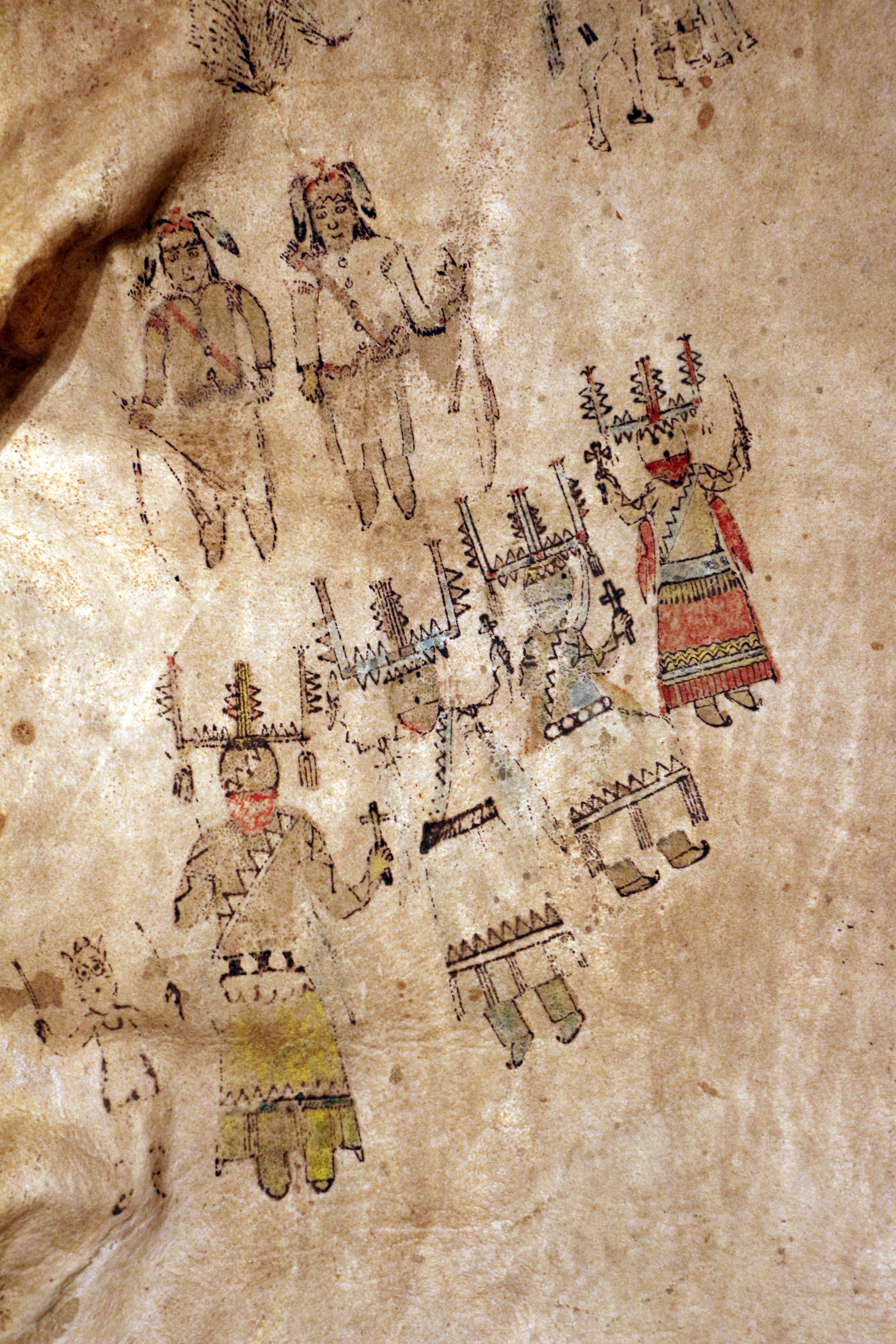

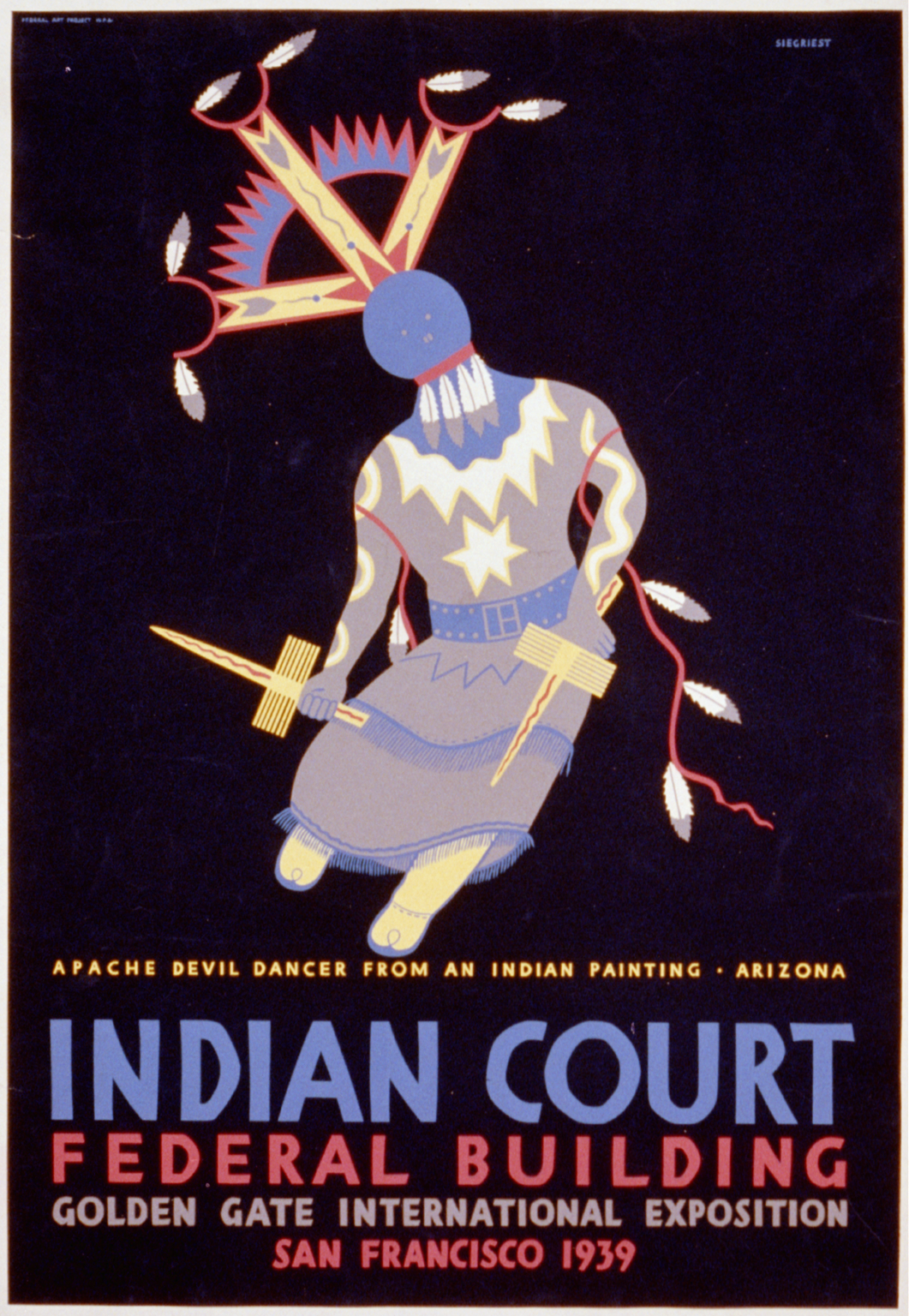
Poster for the Indian Court exhibit at the Golden Gate Exposition, 1939
Video of the Gaan performances
