= Dan Kwong =

- Born: November 26, 1954 (age 71); United States
- Occupations: Performance artist, director, writer, teacher
- Writing career
- Genre: solo performance
- Website: www.dankwong.com

Dan Kwong is an American performance artist, playwright, director, teacher, and documentary videomaker. He has been presenting his solo performances since 1989, frequently drawing upon his own life experiences to explore personal, historical, and societal issues.

Critically-acclaimed as a "master storyteller", his works intertwine multimedia, dynamic physical movement, poetry, martial arts and music. He has been an artist with multicultural performing arts organization Great Leap, Inc. since 1990 and assumed the position of Associate Artistic Director in 2011. He has been a Resident Mentor Artist at the 18th Street Arts Center in Santa Monica, California since 1992.

== Early life ==
The Kwong family moved to Silverlake, Los Angeles, then a working-class neighborhood with primarily Asian and African American families, in 1960. The second of four children, Kwong has three sisters: Maria, Diana, and Barbara. His father Sam Kwong was a commercial photographer from Guangzhou, China. His mother Momo Nagano was a Japanese American weaver born in L.A. and interned at Manzanar.

Kwong is a graduate of the School of the Art Institute of Chicago.

== Manzanar Baseball Project ==
In 2023, Kwong began his largest restoration project to date: the restoration of the baseball field at Manzanar National Historic Site in California's Owens Valley, where his mother and her family were incarcerated during World War II. As part of the project, he also organized a doubleheader exhibition featuring players from California's Japanese American baseball leagues.

These are actually two separate efforts with separate budgets and production teams: Field Restoration (Manzanar's project) and Exhibition Doubleheader (Kwong's concept) - however both have been spearheaded by Kwong since Fall 2023.

Overseen by Manzanar's archeologist and Cultural Resources Program Manager Jeff Burton, Field Restoration work has been led by Kwong contributing approx. 1,000 hours of volunteer labor (and counting). Technical expertise has been provided by Construction Supervisor Chris Siddens, a retired welder and construction worker from the nearby town of Independence (also a volunteer), and Dave Goto, Manzanar's award-winning Chief Arborist.

Produced by multicultural performing arts organization Great Leap, Inc., the first Exhibition Doubleheader was staged October 26, 2024 for players & family only, due to staffing limitations. Described by Kwong as "historically-based, culturally-rooted performance art", the event received widespread national and international media coverage, furthering his basic goal of bringing wider attention to the story of Japanese American internment - the largest mass incarceration in United States history.

The doubleheader features California's top Japanese American ballplayers dressed in custom 1940s-style uniforms and using vintage baseball equipment. Plans are in development to live-stream the Grand Opening targeted for October 2025, this time open to a limited number of public. To further enhance this historical re-enactment, production crew and volunteers will also be costumed in 1940s attire with spectators encouraged to do so as well, creating a fully immersive experience.

The project has inspired a wide outpouring of support, for both field restoration and doubleheader, from numerous individuals, organizations, and companies including:

Jesse Chakrin of Fund For People In Parks (providors of the original grant to fund field restoration); Steve Kluger; Pam Elyea & Lauren Stewart of History For Hire Prop House; Liz Mahlow & Anna Tam of Nous Engineering; Stephanie Matsuda-Strand & Kari Kikuta of LPA Design Studios; Dan Clem & John Clem of Telacu Construction; Darrin Lamarre of Herrick Steel; Gwynne Pugh of Gwynne Pugh Urban Studio; Joe Cappello and Independence Volunteer Fire Department; Alan Miyatake of Toyo Miyatake Studio; Rosanne Lampariello of Inyo County Unified School District; LA DWP; Jan Williamson & Michael Ano of 18th Street Arts Center; Darren Carter of Highways Performance Space; Debra Nakatomi of California Wellness Foundation; Ann Burroughs of Japanese American National Museum; Phyllis Hayashibara & Suzanne Thompson of Venice Japanese American Memorial Monument Committee; retired Manzanar Park Ranger Alisa Broch Lynch; Mike Boulia; Kim Lu Lawe; Ingrid Good; Alvin Yano; Gino McKiernan; Sho Yamada; Joe Mendez, and many more.

The Manzanar Baseball Project is an ongoing partnership/collaboration between Manzanar National Historic Site (Superintendent Jeremy Scheier) and Great Leap, Inc. (Executive/Artistic Director Alison De La Cruz).

Kwong's ultimate goal is to make the Exhibition Doubleheader an annual tradition at Manzanar.

=== Relevance to Current Events ===
The relevance and significance of Japanese American incarceration became clear in March 2025 when President Trump invoked the Enemy Aliens Act of 1798. This archaic law gives the Executive Branch authority to target a group of people for incarceration or deportation simply by virtue of their identity, regardless of what they have or have not done, and without due process of law. Last used in 1942 by President Roosevelt to authorize the removal and incarceration of Japanese and Japanese Americans, it has now been used by Pres. Trump to deport a group of people, again without due process. The potential for abuse of this archaic law is graphically evidenced by the experience of Japanese Americans who were denied their Constitutional rights.

In April 2025, Interim U.S. Attorney Ed Martin equated the prosecution of rioters who invaded the Capitol on January 6, 2021 with the legal atrocity enacted upon Japanese Americans in 1942, drawing sharp rebukes from Senator Mazie Hirono, the Japanese American National Museum, Japanese American Citizens League, and more.

These events demonstrate the continued relevance of Winston Churchill's observation, "Those who fail to learn from history are doomed to repeat it." History has always been an important component in Kwong's artwork throughout his career.

== Major solo performances ==
- Secrets of the Samurai Centerfielder 1989
- Tales From the Fractured Tao 1991
- Monkhood in 3 Easy Lessons 1993
- Correspondence of a Dangerous Enemy Alien 1995
- The Dodo Vaccine 1996
- The Night the Moon Landed on 39th Street 1999
- It's Great 2B American (2008)
- What? No Ping-Pong Balls? (with musician Kenny Endo) 2013

These works explore subjects such as cultural confusion and discovery in a mixed heritage family; allergic reactions to “Model Minority Syndrome"; dysfunctional family "Asian American-style"; Asian male identity; Japanese American internment during WWII; the impact of HIV/AIDS on Asian Americans; the American space program; and Asian American single motherhood. Kwong has performed in over 40 of the United States and in England, Hong Kong, Thailand, Indonesia, Cambodia, Mexico, Canada, China and Korea.

== Major collaborative performances ==
- Samurai Centerfielder Meets The Mad Kabuki Woman (with Denise Uyehara) 1997
- The Art of Rice (international ensemble) 2003
- Sleeping With Strangers (with Chinese opera artist Peng Jingquan. Beijing, China) 2006
- Once We Wanted (with dancer/choreographer Iu-Hui Chua) 2011

== Plays ==
Kwong's first play, Be Like Water, was developed with Cedar Grove OnStage and received its world premiere at East West Players in Los Angeles, in September 2008. The play, directed by Chris Tashima, is about a teenage girl who is trained by the ghost of Bruce Lee to deal with her bullies, rivals and parents. The title is derived from the Lee quote: "Be formless ... shapeless, like water."

In 2019, Kwong began writing a play with Ruben Funkahuatl Guevara of Ruben and the Jets based on the short story Masao and the Bronze Nightingale, by Guevara. The play, funded by the Eastside Initiative and produced at Casa 0101 Theater in Spring 2022, explores the historical relationships between the Japanese, Mexican, and African American communities of Boyle Heights, Los Angeles and Little Tokyo, Los Angeles during the post-World War II period when these communities intersected like never before.

== Other Performance Projects ==
Tales of Little Tokyo - In summer of 2018, Kwong was one of four artists selected (with filmmaker Tina Takemoto, painter Susu Attar, calligrapher Kuni Yoshida) for the inaugural +LAB Artist Residency, sponsored by the Little Tokyo Service Center. For 3 months the artists lived in the historic old Daimaru Hotel on First Street and created community-based art projects on the theme of "Self-determination and Community Control" for Little Tokyo—a 140+ year-old community now threatened by gentrification. Each artist was partnered with a local organization for their project, Dan being paired with the Japanese American National Museum. For his project Dan interviewed over 50 people with various relationships to Little Tokyo past and present, ranging in age from 97 to 17. After transcribing and editing hundreds of their stories, he selected approx. 30 interviews to create a portrait of the community through the decades, showing its significance to people over generations. It was presented as a reading with veteran Nisei actress Takayo Fischer at JANM's Democracy Forum at the end of July. Tales of Little Tokyo is still being developed to incorporate more stories and a multimedia component. It was presented again in January 2020 with Takayo Fischer and the addition of actress Hanna-Lee Sakakibara, once again at the Tateuchi Democracy Forum at JANM.

== Stage Directing ==
In January/February 2019 Dan directed and dramaturged the world premiere of Tales of Clamor, by traci kato-kiriyama and Kennedy Kabesares. Along with traci and Kennedy, cast included Takayo Fischer, Kurt Kuniyoshi, Jully Lee, Sharon Omi and Greg Watanabe. The show had a 4-week run at the Aratani Black Box Theater at the Japanese American Cultural and Community Center in Los Angeles. It was re-mounted in April 2022 at USC's Bing Theater with a revised cast of Greg Watanabe, Sharon Omi, Dian Kobayashi (in place of Takayo Fischer), Pauline Yasuda (in place of Jully Lee) and Shaun Shimoda (in place of Kurt Kuniyoshi), along with creators traci and Kennedy.

Confessions of a Radical Chicano Doo-Wop Singer - In the summer of 2016 Kwong directed Ruben Funkahuatl Guevara's critically acclaimed solo performance/reading of Confessions of a Radical Chicano Doo-Wop Singer produced at Casa 0101 in Boyle Heights. Based on excerpts from Guevara's memoir of the same title, Confessions was also staged at the Mark Taper Auditorium of L.A. Main Public Library downtown in 2017.

FandangObon - Since its inception in 2013 Dan has directed this annual cross-cultural event of traditional Japanese, Mexican and West African music and dance. FandangObon brings together the traditions of Japanese Obon, son jarocho from Mexico, and West African drumming and dance. The free public event takes place every Fall in downtown Los Angeles.

== Video ==
Kwong directed and edited a series of environmental music videos in collaboration with singer/songwriter Nobuko Miyamoto, produced by Great Leap: B.Y.O. CHOPSTIX (2010), MOTTAINAI (2011), and CYCLES OF CHANGE (2012), all featuring Miyamoto as the lead character. CYCLES OF CHANGE was created in collaboration with the Grammy Award-winning Chicano rock band QUETZAL and features their lead singer Martha Gonzalez. All videos can be seen on YouTube under the Great Leap channel, and can be found through greatleap.org.

In Fall of 2014 Kwong began work on a documentary/art video project, The House on Robinson Road. The video will explore the legacy of Kwong's great-grandfather through his house on Hong Kong island (built in 1933 for him, his wife, 5 concubines and 21 children), and its connection to Kwong's relationship with his own father within the context of owning-class colonial HK-Chinese society. In December 2017 Dan returned to HK for more shooting, this time assisted by independent filmmaker Max Good. The project remains in-progress.

In 2021 Kwong produced two feature-length documentaries:

We Were All Here (Writer, Director, Lead Editor) chronicles the multicultural history of the Santa Monica neighborhood known as La Veinte (or the Pico Neighborhood) through the story of the Casillas family, Santa Monica's largest single family to immigrate from Mexico. Commissioned by 18th Street Arts Center and created in collaboration with artist Paulina Sahagun.

Con Safos (Co-Executive Producer) reveals Ruben Funkahuatl Guevara's unique role in the evolution of Chicano culture, especially through music. Produced for PBS station KCET's ArtBound series. Nominated for a Los Angeles-area Emmy, and winner of LA Press Club and National Arts & Entertainment Journalism awards.

== Teaching / Curating ==
In 1994 Kwong founded the Asian American Men's Writing and Performing Workshop in Los Angeles to tackle Asian stereotypes in media. With a grant from the Los Angeles Cultural Affairs Dept. he created "Everything You Ever Wanted to Know About Asian Men...", a series of performance workshops specifically focused on Asian American men exploring their identities.

As a teacher Kwong has led numerous workshops in autobiographical writing and performing throughout the U.S. and in Hong Kong, Indonesia, Thailand, Canada and Japan. In 1991 he founded “Treasure In The House,” L.A.’s first Asian Pacific American performance and visual art festival, presented at Highways Performance Space in Santa Monica, California, serving as its curator until 2003.

His "Everything You Ever Wanted to Know About Asian Men..." workshops resulted in the creation of similar groups (led by "alumni" of the original group) in New York, New Haven, Boston, Portland, Philadelphia and beyond, playing a key role in the development of succeeding generations of Asian American solo performers. Since 2005 he has served as Project Director of "Collaboratory", Great Leap's mentorship program designed to develop the next generation of artist-leaders in Los Angeles.

== Bibliography ==
- FROM INNER WORLDS TO OUTER SPACE – The Multimedia Performances of Dan Kwong (2004, University of Michigan Press)
