= Latino Theater Company =

American theatre group in Los Angeles, California

- Formation: 1985
- Type: Theatre group
- Purpose: Latino theatre
- Location(s): The Los Angeles Theatre Center 514 S. Spring St. Los Angeles, California 90013
- Notable members: Jose Luis Valenzuela, founding Artistic Director
- Website: latinotheaterco.org

The Latino Theater Company (LTC) is a theatre producing organization based in Los Angeles, California.

== History ==
Latino Theater Company was founded in 1985 by its Artistic Director, Jose Luis Valenzuela. Founding members included Lupe Ontiveros and Enrique Castillo.

Known as the "Latino Theater Lab" and based at The Los Angeles Theatre Center (LATC), they produced plays and comedy showcases. They also created the "New Voices Playwriting Series," which commissioned many Latino playwrights. When LATC closed in 1991, LTC moved to the Mark Taper Forum, where Valenzuela created the "Latino Theater Initiative." The group moved to Plaza de la Raza in 1995. LTC returned to The LATC and in 2004 received a grant from the California Cultural and Historical Endowment to renovate The LATC and create a multicultural theater arts center, along with the Latino Museum of History, Art and Culture. In 2006, LTC became the operator of The LATC, and invited several culturally different producing organizations together, creating the "Cultural Roundtable," to create theatre that reflects the cultural landscape of the City of Los Angeles. "Cultural Roundtable" participants include Latino Theater Company, Robey Theatre Company, Cedar Grove OnStage, Playwrights' Arena, Culture Clash, American Indian Dance Theatre and the UCLA School of Theater Film and Television.

In 2003, Latino Theater Company presented La Virgen de Guadalupe, Dios Inantzin, performed at the Cathedral of Our Lady of the Angels in Downtown Los Angeles. The pageant play has been performed every year since, and has become an annual Southern California holiday tradition offered free of charge to the community, for low-income, working families.
