= Visas and Virtue =

- One-sheet photography: Dennis Mukai
- Directed by: Chris Tashima
- Written by: Chris Tashima; Tom Donaldson; Tim Toyama (play)
- Produced by: Chris Donahue; Tim Toyama
- Starring: Chris Tashima; Susan Fukuda; Diana Georger; Lawrence Craig
- Narrated by: Shizuko Hoshi
- Cinematography: Hiro Narita
- Edited by: Irvin Paik
- Music by: Scott Nagatani
- Production company: Cedar Grove Productions
- Release date: 1997
- Running time: 26 minutes
- Country: United States
- Language: English

Visas and Virtue is a 1997 narrative short film directed by Chris Tashima and starring Tashima, Susan Fukuda, Diana Georger and Lawrence Craig. It was inspired by the true story of Holocaust rescuer Chiune "Sempo" Sugihara, who is known as "The Japanese Schindler". Sugihara issued over 2,000 transit visas to Polish and Lithuanian Jews from his consulate in Kaunas, Lithuania, in August 1940, in defiance of his own government (Japan), thereby allowing an estimated 6,000 individuals to escape the impending Holocaust.

== Background ==
This film is a dramatization (docu-drama) and contains fictional characters and events. It is not a documentary. It is based on an original one-act play by Tim Toyama, which was performed at The Road Theatre Company in Los Angeles in 1995. The play was then adapted by actor/director Chris Tashima in 1996, and completed as a 26-minute film in 1997. The film was produced by Cedar Grove Productions with Visual Communications serving as non-profit sponsor.

Visas and Virtue won the Oscar for Best Live Action Short Film in March, 1998 (70th Academy Awards). The Oscar statuettes went to actor and director Tashima and producer Chris Donahue.

== Synopsis ==
Haunted by the sight of hundreds of Jewish refugees outside the consulate gates, a Japanese diplomat and his wife, stationed in Kaunas, Lithuania, at the beginning of World War II, must decide how much they are willing to risk. Inspired by a true story, Visas and Virtue explores the moral and professional dilemmas that Consul General Chiune "Sempo" Sugihara faces in making a life or death decision: defy his own government's direct orders and risk his career, by issuing life-saving transit visas, or obey orders and turn his back on humanity.

== Cast ==
- Chris Tashima as Chiune "Sempo" Sugihara
- Susan Fukuda as Yukiko Sugihara
- Diana Georger as Helena Rosen
- Lawrence Craig as Nathan Rosen
- Shizuko Hoshi as Narrator

=== Japan, 1985 ===
- Mitsushi Yamaguchi as Elderly Sempo
- Kyoko Motoyama as Elderly Yuki

=== Lithuania, 1940 ===
- Colm Wood as Student #1
- Eric Gugisch as German Officer
- Alan H. Friedenthal as Refugee #1
- Patricia Penn as Refugee #2
- Richard Nakaoka, Weston Yanagihara as Sugihara Children
- Linda Igarashi as Setsuko
- Jimmy Paola as Student #2
- Kimberly Mungovan as Sugihara Baby

=== Refugees at interviews ===
- Martin Fontana as Man
- Noel Miller as Young Man
- David Russ as Elderly Man
- Maria Stanton as Wife
- Jude Gerard Prest as Husband
- Shauna Bloom as Woman
- Gibson Frazier as Cantor
- Jon Cellini, Jonathan Klein as Brothers
- Pamela Tretter as Mother
- Jack Newalu as Man at Train Station

=== Special appearance ===
- Hanni Vogelweid as Elderly Woman at Interview

== Awards ==
- Academy Award for Live Action Short Film – 70th Academy Awards
- 1st Place: Fiction Prize – USA Film Festival/Dallas
- "Francisco Garcia de Paso" Award – Huesca International Film Festival
- Crystal Heart Award – Heartland Film Festival
- CINE Golden Eagle
- Special Jury Prize – Competition for Films and Videos on Japan
- "Adriano Morais" Award – Algarve International Film Festival
- Golden Shoestring Award – Rochester International Film Festival
- Best Short Film – Sonoma Valley Film Festival
