= Takayo Fischer =

American actress (born 1932)

- Born: Takayo Doris Tsubouchi; 1932 (age 93–94)
- Occupation: Actress
- Years active: 1979–present
- Spouse: Sy Fischer (m. 1980)

Takayo Fischer (née Tsubouchi; born 1932) is an American stage, film and television actress, as well as voice-over actress.

== Personal life ==
Fischer is the youngest of four daughters of Japanese immigrants Chukuro, a farm laborer, and Kinko Tsubouchi. During World War II, at age 10, she and her family were forcibly removed from the West Coast following the signing of Executive Order 9066. They spent time in the Fresno Assembly Center before being relocated to the Jerome and Rohwer incarceration camps.

After their release, the Tsubouchi family went to Chicago, Illinois, where, as a young adult, Tsubouchi won the crown of "Miss Nisei Queen." She graduated from Hyde Park High School in Chicago in 1950 and attended Rollins College from 1951 to 1953, where she was a cheerleader and member of the performing arts fraternity Phi Beta. She resides in Los Angeles.

In 1980, she married Sy Fischer, an entertainment executive and Hanna-Barbera agent.

== Career ==
Fischer appeared in the stage production of The World of Suzie Wong in New York in 1958. She won a Drama-Logue Award for ensemble performance for Tea at the Old Globe Theatre in San Diego. She has also appeared in many productions with East West Players in Los Angeles, including Into The Woods. Fischer was an honoree at East West Players' 2019 gala for her work in raising "the visibility of the Asian Pacific American (APA) community through [her] craft." She toured the U.S. and Europe in The Peony Pavilion in 1997.

1978, Takayo appeared in "The Incredible Hulk" s1 e10 as a nurse. https://www.imdb.com/title/tt0610883/?ref_=tt_ov_ep_nx

Fischer has appeared in many big-budget films, including Moneyball, Pirates of the Caribbean: At World's End (2007) as Mistress Ching, The Pursuit of Happyness (2006) as Mrs. Chu, Memoirs of a Geisha (2005) and War of the Worlds (2005). She has also worked on many independent Asian American films including Americanese (2009), Only the Brave (2005), Stand Up for Justice: The Ralph Lazo Story (2004) and Strawberry Fields (1997).

Fischer has had numerous guest-starring roles on network television including FX's It's Always Sunny In Philadelphia and Walden Media's The Baby-Sitter's Club. She is sometimes credited as Takayo Doran.

=== Voice work ===
Fischer has also done voices in several animated series. Her roles include Mister T, Battle of the Planets, Rubik the Amazing Cube, A Pup Named Scooby-Doo, Saturday Supercade, The Flintstone Kids, Batman: The Animated Series, Batman Beyond, The All-New Scooby and Scrappy-Doo Show, The Karate Kid, Capitol Critters, The Centurions, The Plastic Man Comedy/Adventure Show, The Heathcliff and Dingbat Show, Super Friends, Thundarr the Barbarian, Rambo, Wildfire, Captain Planet and the Planeteers, Teen Titans, Justice League Unlimited, The Wild Thornberrys, Avatar: The Last Airbender, and Justice League.

She also reprised her role as Mistress Ching in the video game version of Pirates of the Caribbean: At World's End.

== Filmography ==
=== Television ===
Year	Title	Role	Notes
1991	Beverly Hills, 90210	Driving Tester	Episode: "Leading from the Heart"
1992	Batman: The Animated Series	Dr. Wu (voice)	Episode: "Dreams in Darkness"
1994	Baby Brokers	Emily Weiss	Television film
2000	The Wild Thornberrys	Red Panda (voice)	Episode: "Happy Campers"
2001	Batman Beyond	Kairi Tanaga (voice)	Episode: "Curse of the Kobra"
2005	Teen Titans	Chu-hui (voice)	Episode: "The Quest"
2005	Justice League Unlimited	Mairzey (voice)	Episode: "I Am Legion"
2006–2008	Avatar: The Last Airbender	Lo, Li (voice)	4 episodes
2007	It's Always Sunny in Philadelphia	Mr. Kim	Episode: "The Gang Solves the North Korea Situation"
2011	Silent but Deadly	Wang	Television film
2020–2021	The Baby-Sitters Club	Mimi Yamamoto	7 episodes

=== Film ===
Year	Title	Role	Notes
1989	Dad	Jake's Nurse	
1990	Pacific Heights	Bank Teller	
1991	Showdown in Little Tokyo	Mama Yamaguchi	
1995	The Dangerous	Mrs. Seki	
1997	Strawberry Fields	Takayo	
2005	War of the Worlds	Older Woman	
2005	Memoirs of a Geisha	Tanizato Teahouse Owner	
2006	Only the Brave	Mrs. Nakajo	
2006	Americanese	Keiko Crane	
2007	Pirates of the Caribbean: At World's End	Mistress Ching	
2008	The Pursuit of Happyness	Mrs. Chu	
2008	Uncross the Stars	Tina	
2008	Immigrants	Japanese Woman (voice)	English dub
2009	Love 10 to 1	Grandma	
2011	Moneyball	Suzanne	
2012	Model Minority	Reiko Tanaka	
2013	Cavemen	Japanese Woman	
2016	The Watcher	Gladys	

=== Video games ===
Year	Title	Role	Notes
2008	Crisis Core: Final Fantasy VII	Gillian Hewley	
