= Grateful Crane Ensemble =

U.S. non-profit theatre company

- Formation: July 2001
- Type: Theatre group
- Purpose: musical theatre
- Location: Southern California
- Notable members: Soji Kashiwagi, Executive Producer, Playwright
- Website: www.gratefulcrane.com

The Grateful Crane Ensemble is a non-profit 501(c)(3) Asian American theatre company based in Southern California, established in July 2001.

== Mission ==
The Grateful Crane Ensemble's mission is to create and present meaningful and entertaining bilingual programs for Japanese American seniors in appreciation of the many sacrifices they have made so the generations that followed could live a better life in America.

== Profile ==
The Grateful Crane Ensemble has been performing nostalgic programs in Japanese and English, for senior citizens at the Keiro Retirement Home, in East Los Angeles, and those throughout the Japanese American community. Through music, song and storytelling, the Ensemble honors, pays tribute to and remembers the Issei, Nisei and Kibei elders, as a way of "giving something back".

== Productions ==
The Grateful Crane Ensemble produced the touring show, The Camp Dance: The Music and the Memories, a tribute to those who endured the Japanese American internment during World War II, and to how music, song and dances help internees face the hardships of "relocation".

In 2003 the Ensemble received a grant from the California Civil Liberties Public Education Program to allow their program, The Camp Dance, to tour eight cities in California. A second CCLPEP grant in 2004 allowed for additional performances, and for the show to be recorded on CD.

In 2006, The Grateful Crane Ensemble premiered Nihonmachi: The Place To Be - A Musical Journey at the Japanese Cultural and Community Center of Northern California, as part of the celebration of the 100th Anniversary of San Francisco's Japantown.

In 2009, The Grateful Crane Ensemble received a California Civil Liberties Public Education Program grant to produce Hiroshi Kashiwagi's play, The Betrayed, which will be presented in 2010 at the Japanese American National Museum.

== Awards ==
- 2006 Ruby Yoshino Schaar Playwright Award (to Soji Kashiwagi) for The Camp Dance: The Music and the Memories – presented by the New York/National JACL
- 2010 Bravo Award – presented by the Asia America Symphony Association and Guild
