= Soji Kashiwagi =

American journalist

- Born: September 10, 1962 (age 63); Oakland, California, U.S.
- Occupations: playwright Theatre Producer

Soji Kashiwagi (born September 10, 1962, in Oakland, California) is a Sansei (third-generation Japanese American) journalist, playwright and producer. He is the Executive Producer for the Grateful Crane Ensemble theatre company in Los Angeles. He has contributed to The Rafu Shimpo with his column, "Corner Store." He is the son of Nisei playwright Hiroshi Kashiwagi.

== Education ==
Kashiwagi grew up in San Francisco and graduated from Lowell High School and San Francisco State University, majoring in journalism. He also studied film production at Visual Communications (VC) and play writing at East West Players, in Los Angeles.

== Career ==
Kashiwagi's comedy play The Grapevine was produced in 1993 at the Los Angeles Theatre Center. In 2001 he formed a theatre company, the Grateful Crane Ensemble, where for several years he wrote and produced bilingual (Japanese and English) shows using music, song and story, to entertain Japanese American senior citizens at the Keiro Retirement Home in East Los Angeles In 2003, Kashiwagi wrote the play The Camp Dance: The Music & The Memories, which was produced by Grateful Crane, toured the Western U.S., and received the 2006 Ruby Yoshino Schaar Playwright Award from the New York/National Japanese American Citizens League. Kashiwagi wrote Nihonmachi: The Place To Be – A Musical Journey, which Grateful Crane first produced in 2006 at the Japanese Cultural and Community Center of Northern California, as part of the 100th-anniversary celebration of San Francisco's Japantown. Both Camp Dance and Nihonmachi have continued to be performed by Grateful Crane. In 2009, Kashiwagi received a California Civil Liberties Public Education Program grant to produce his father's play, The Betrayed, which will be presented by the Grateful Crane Ensemble in 2010 at the Japanese American National Museum.

== Plays ==
- The Grapevine
- The Camp Dance: The Music & The Memories
- Nihonmachi: The Place to Be

== Awards ==
- 2006 Ruby Yoshino Schaar Playwright Award – The Camp Dance: The Music & The Memories
