= Los Angeles Theatre Center =

Theater venue in Los Angeles, California

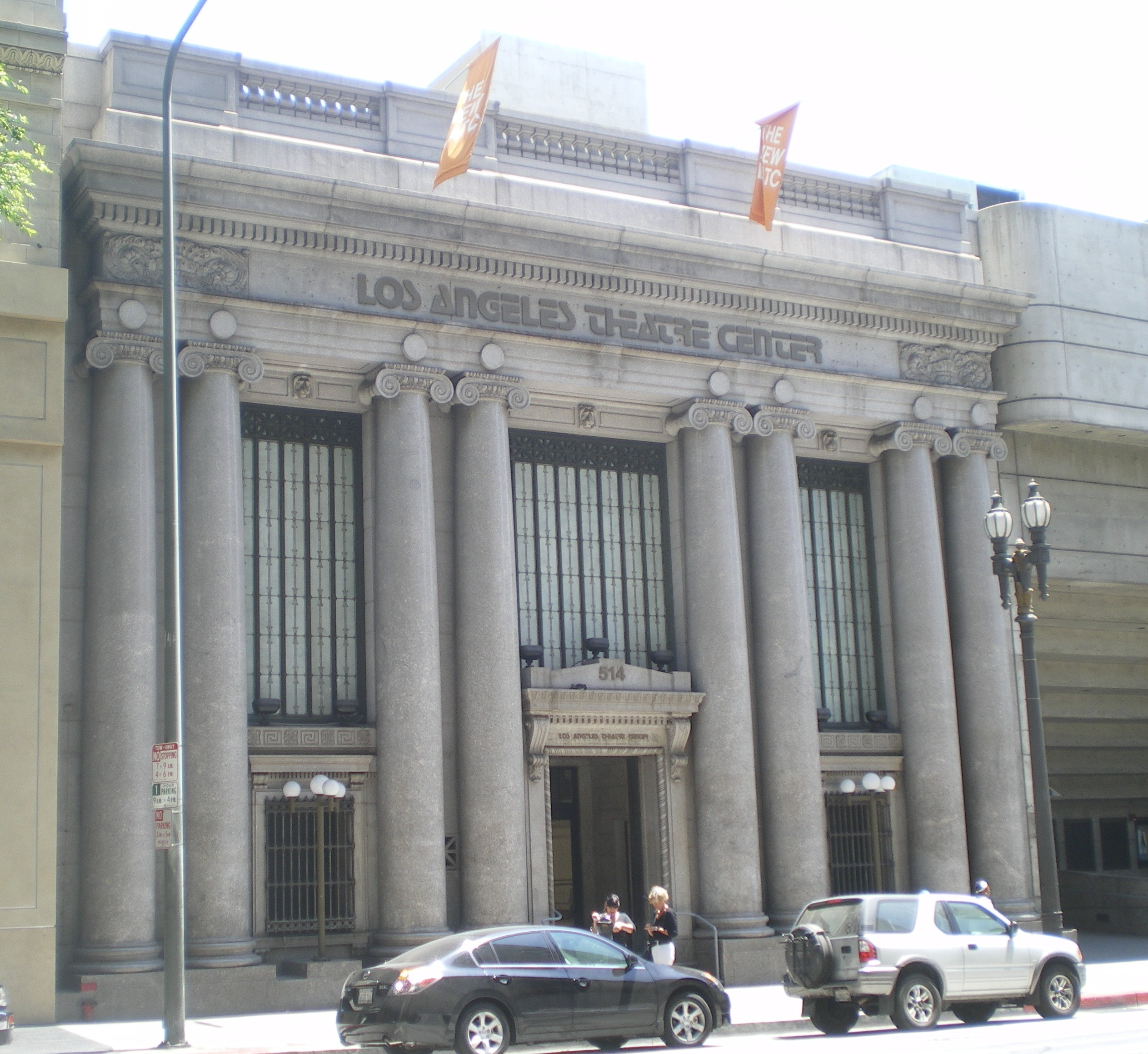
- The building in 2008

- Location within the Los Angeles metropolitan area
- Address: 514 S. Spring Street; Los Angeles, California; United States
- Coordinates: 34.0468°N 118.2497°W
- Owner: City of Los Angeles Department of Cultural Affairs
- Operator: Latino Theater Company
- Capacity: Tom Bradley Theatre: 496; Lupe Ontiveros Cinema Center: 250; Theatre 3: 318; Theatre 4: 99; Luis Avalos Theatre: 99

Construction
- Opened: 1985
- President Trading Company
- U.S. Historic district – Contributing property
- Built: 1916
- Architect: John Parkinson
- Architectural style: Greek Revival
- Part of: Spring Street Financial District (ID79000489)
- Designated CP: August 10, 1979

Los Angeles Theatre Center is a theater complex located at 514 S. Spring Street in downtown Los Angeles, California. The complex opened in 1985 and has been operated by Latino Theater Company since 2006.

The building previously housed banks and is a contributing property in the Spring Street Financial District.

== Building ==
The building that would become the Los Angeles Theatre Center was designed by John Parkinson and built in 1916. Prior to its theater conversion, the building was known as President Trading Company and Security National Bank Building.

In 1979, the Spring Street Financial District was added to the National Register of Historic Places, with President Trading Company listed as a contributing property in the district. The building was used as a storage space and filled with boxes around this time.

=== Architecture and design ===
Los Angeles Theatre Center is a one-story steel reinforced structure made of brick and faced with granite. It features a Greek Revival design that includes four pairs of ionic columns. Windows behind the columns light the building's interior.

A second entrance was added to the building when it was converted to a theater complex. This entrance leads to a 35-foot (11 m) Modernist designed skylighted lobby, which also contains a 50-by-100-foot (15 m × 30 m) stained glass ceiling supported by heavy bronze cornices and marble walls.

== Theater complex ==
From 1982 to 1985, this building was converted into a 1,215 seat theater complex. John Sergio Fisher led the conversion. As of 2023, the complex housed five theaters, with the largest single theater seating nearly 500.

Los Angeles Theatre Center sold $3.5 million in tickets in 1989 ($9.09 million in 2025) and was home to nearly 100 plays in its first six years of existence. The City of Los Angeles took over the complex's ownership in 1990; an eleven day sit in soon after persuaded them to keep the complex open. Shows played to an average 67% capacity in 1991, with a total attendance of about 200,000.

Latino Theater Company became the operator of Los Angeles Theater Center in 2006. The company also received a $4 million ($6.39 million in 2025) grant from the California Cultural and Historical Endowment to refurbish the building that year.

== See also ==
- List of contributing properties in the Spring Street Financial District
