= List of Ghostwriter characters =

The following is a list of characters from the book and television series Ghostwriter.

== Ghostwriter ==
This is what Ghostwriter looks like as he flies through the air and reads words.

The titular character of the series is an enigmatic figure. The mystery of Ghostwriter's true identity is never fully answered, although several clues are given during the course of the series in several of the cases (the following facts are from "Ghost Story", the pilot episode, unless otherwise stated):

- He was a man when he was alive, but is now a ghost.
- He wanted to protect "the children".
- He can only be seen by those to whom he reveals himself.
- He can read and feel emotions.
- He cannot hear.
- He communicates by writing.
- He cannot talk.
- He was alive before:
  1. the Federal Bureau of Investigation was formed (1908).
  2. Walt Disney became famous (after 1920).
  3. Elvis Presley (born 1935).
- He cannot see pictures.
- He wrapped around the Prison Ship Martyrs' Monument as if happy or familiar with it.
- He requires team cohesion in order to "survive". ("Get the Message")
- He can travel through time. ("Just in Time")
- He can travel across the Internet. ("Who is Max Mouse?")
- At one point, he remembers he was chased by dogs. ("A Crime of Two Cities")

The producers' intent was to reveal Ghostwriter to be "a famous 15th- to 16th-century writer, but not Shakespeare" at the end of the first season, although this eventually never happened.

D.J. MacHale, who wrote the pilot episode, stated: "If memory serves, Ghostwriter was supposed to be an ancestor of Jamal's, who was an escaped slave from the south who educated himself and learned the value of reading".

According to producer and writer Kermit Frazier: "Ghostwriter was a runaway slave during the Civil War. He was killed by slave catchers and their dogs as he was teaching other runaway slaves how to read in the woods. His soul was kept in the book and released once Jamal discovered the book".

== The Ghostwriter Team ==
The Ghostwriter Team

When the show began, it was based around four main characters, all students at Zora Neale Hurston Middle School and Washington Elementary School in Fort Greene, Brooklyn, New York. The "team" later expanded to include six (later seven) active members, one MIA member, one member in Australia, two members in England, and three members in 1928.

To become a member of the team, a kid would have to be able to read the words that Ghostwriter manipulates. There was normally an induction ceremony for each new member that joined the team. At this ceremony, they would be given a special pen with a string to be placed around the neck so the members could write to Ghostwriter no matter where they happened to be and to note all of the clues in their investigations. When a team meeting was required, one of the members would use Ghostwriter to send out the message "Rally", followed by the first initial of the member that was hosting the meeting (usually either Jamal, Alex, Lenni or Gaby). Alex, Jamal, and Lenni also came up with a special Ghostwriter handshake for the team.

Members of the team also use a casebook. A casebook is a binder with papers for noting all the suspects, evidence against them, and clues in their investigations, allowing the team to review them. Alex later coins the review under the term "Rewind", which the team likes and it became their catch phrase. As Gaby said, "solving a case is like putting a jigsaw puzzle together, and the casebook is where (they) keep all the pieces". Basically, a casebook is an effective tool to "Start piecin' the puzzle. Organizing stuff, getting it together". Ghostwriter would also read whatever was written within the casebook, and then help the team to find more clues. There is also another casebook especially made for Ghostwriter to help him figure out who he was.

Make a casebook to keep track of all the clues:

- Make a page for each suspect.
  - SUSPECT: Who might have done the crime?
  - EVIDENCE: Where was the suspect and why would he or she do it?
- Make a page for OTHER CLUES.
  - Write facts that may be important to help solve the case.

=== Jamal Jenkins ===
Jamal (portrayed by Sheldon Turnipseed) is level-headed and intelligent; the first person Ghostwriter reveals himself to and the de facto leader of the Ghostwriter team. In the first episode of the series, "Ghost Story, Part 1", seventh grader Jamal is cleaning out the basement of his family's brownstone with his father, Reginald “Reggie” Jenkins (portrayed by Samuel L. Jackson in the first three cases and Dean Irby afterwards), and his mother, Doris Jenkins (portrayed by Elizabeth Van Dyke), when a spirit emerges from a book that has fallen on the ground and begins communicating with Jamal through words.

Jamal lives with his parents and his grandmother, Cecelia “CeCe” Jenkins (portrayed by Marcella Lowery); his older sister, Danitra Jenkins (portrayed by Samaria Graham), is away at college. Midway through the second season, Jamal's young cousin, Casey Austin, also comes to stay with the family. Jamal's interests include karate and science; he dreams to one day be "a scientist that performs experiments in outer space". Jamal applies for enrollment in the High School of Science in "Who is Max Mouse?", and in "Don't Stop the Music" he is accepted.

Major cases for Jamal include:

- "Ghost Story": Jamal discovers Ghostwriter.
- "Who Burned Mr. Brinker's Store?": Jamal is accused of burning a local video store, causing discord in the team following his covering up of the facts.
- "Who's Who": In a subplot, Jamal's grandmother is sick.
- "Get the Message": Works with Rob to get the team back together and prevent Ghostwriter from fading away after the discord within the team.
- "Just in Time": Takes place in Jamal's home, circa 1928. Ghostwriter is also working hard in this case due to the "future" of Jamal's family and the team.
- "Who is Max Mouse?": Jamal introduces the team to the Internet. Also, Jamal is a suspect for causing false fire alarms and changing grades at school.
- "A Crime of Two Cities": Jamal travels to London and gets involved with a mystery that spans the Atlantic Ocean.

=== Lenni Frazier ===
Lenni (portrayed by Blaze Berdahl) is the second person to "see" Ghostwriter. A headstrong girl, Lenni is an aspiring singer, rapper, and songwriter. Lenni lives with her widowed father, Max Frazier (portrayed by Richard Cox from the first season through the middle of the second season, and Keith Langsdale afterwards), in a loft above the Fernandezes' Bodega. Max is a musician. Lenni's mother died when she was a young child. Midway through the series, Max begins to date a British woman named Sally Lewis (portrayed by Caroline Lagerfelt). Though Lenni likes Sally very much (she was the one who introduced them), she has trouble coping with her father's new relationship. Lenni is an avid comic book fan, and she also loves cooking with her father and reading Harriet the Spy (also her late mother's favorite book during her childhood).

Major cases for Lenni include:

- "Ghost Story": Lenni discovers Ghostwriter and meets Jamal.
- "Into the Comics": Gets the team involved in a scavenger hunt so they can win the grand prize, and become characters in a comic book.
- "Get the Message": Lenni's father and Alex and Gaby's father bicker over a car accident, causing discord within the team.
- "Who is Max Mouse?": With Jamal, Lenni becomes a suspect for causing false fire alarms and changing grades at school.
- "Don't Stop the Music": Lenni and the team are given the chance by Smash Records to shoot a music video for Lenni's song "You Gotta Believe".
- "Attack of the Slime Monster": When she applied for a job at Hurston's prom, she teams up with Tina's older brother and even has him as a date.

=== Alex Fernández ===
Alejandro "Alex" Fernández (portrayed by David López) is the third person to be introduced to Ghostwriter. A second generation Salvadorian American and a sixth grader, Alex is an aspiring detective and skilled basketball player. Alex and his younger sister Gaby live with their father, Eduardo Fernández (portrayed by Shawn Elliott), and their mother, Estella Fernández (portrayed by Cordelia González from the first season through the middle of the second season and Iliana Guibert afterwards), in the back of the family store (or Bodega), which is located under Lenni's apartment. Alex is prone to a hot temper at times, but also displays a notable amount of courage and determination. Alex has several penpals all over the world.

Major cases for Alex include:

- "Ghost Story": Alex discovers Ghostwriter and meets Jamal.
- "To Catch a Creep": Alex runs for class president and encounters much opposition.
- "Who's Who": Alex begins a romantic attachment with team member, Tina.
- "Over a Barrel": Tina and Alex have their first kiss.
- "Get the Message": Lenni's father and Alex and Gaby's father bicker over a car accident, causing discord within the team.
- "What's Up With Alex?": Alex's basketball teammate Kevin offers him marijuana. However Alex struggles to get Kevin help instead from his substance abuses and to get him out of a robbery scheme at the cost of his relationships with his family and friends in the process.

=== Gaby Fernández ===
Gabriela "Gaby" Fernández (portrayed by Mayteana Morales in seasons one and two, Melissa González in season three) is the fourth person to "see" Ghostwriter. She is Alex's younger sister, goes to Washington Elementary, and is best friends with her teammate Tina. She is 9 years old in "Am I Blue?". She is known for being quite talkative and also interested in learning things about the world around her, but she has a good sense of humor which usually manifests when she is teasing her brother, Alex. Of all the team members, Gaby is the one who appears closest to Ghostwriter on a personal level. Twice, she shows belated concern for Ghostwriter's safety ("Just in Time" and "Who is Max Mouse?"); she creates a word "bed" for him ("Who is Max Mouse?"), and she is shown playing a word game with Ghostwriter in "Lost in Brooklyn". She is an aspiring newscaster.

Major cases for Gaby include:

- "Ghost Story": Gaby discovers Ghostwriter and meets Jamal.
- "Who Burned Mr. Brinker's Store?": Makes a video with Tina while investigating the case to help Jamal prove his innocence.
- "Over a Barrel": Gaby gets sick due to being poisoned by tetrachloroethylene ("perc") contamination in the community garden.
- "Am I Blue?": Gaby steals money from the Bodega's register to buy a "Galaxy Girl" costume.
- "Get the Message": Lenni's father and Alex and Gaby's father bicker over a car accident, causing discord within the team.
- "Four Days of the Cockatoo": Gaby finds a rare palm cockatoo, treasured by a pair of criminals.

=== Tina Nguyen ===
Although Tina (portrayed by Tram-Anh Tran), a Vietnamese American girl is present in the first case of the series, she does not "see" Ghostwriter until the second case, "Who Burned Mr. Brinker's Store?" Despite not being involved with the team on their first case, she investigates it herself for her school and is intrigued by Alex and Jamal's investigation methods after she meets and befriends them. She eventually joins the team after meeting Ghostwriter. She wants to be a filmmaker, and is often seen with a camcorder in her hand, which comes in handy during several cases. She attends acting and film classes, and lives with her parents (father portrayed by Richard Eng; mother portrayed by Ginny Yang), her older brother, Tuan “Tony” Nguyen (portrayed by Welly Yang), and her younger sister, Linda Nguyen (portrayed by Tien Tran) in a traditionalist Vietnamese household. Tina is the first person in her family to be born in the United States. Her parents own a tailor shop which she helps run. Her best friend is Gaby, and she has a romantic relationship with Gaby's brother Alex.

Major cases for Tina include:

- "Who Burned Mr. Brinker's Store?": Tina first "sees" Ghostwriter. She makes a video with Gaby while investigating the case to help Jamal prove his innocence.
- "Who's Who": Tina becomes a "Girl Friday" for classic movie actress, Lana Barnes (portrayed by Patricia Barry), and begins a romance with Alex.
- "Over a Barrel": Tina and Alex have their first kiss.
- "Am I Blue": Alex kisses Tina for not accusing Gaby as a suspect.
- "Lost in Brooklyn": Tina begins middle school, and becomes friends with Safira Simango (portrayed by Madala Hilaire), a new student from the African Republic of Mozambique.

=== Rob Baker ===
Rob (portrayed by Todd Alexander) is a shy transfer student from a military family. His father (portrayed by Dan Ziskie) is a retired U.S. Air Force Colonel. Rob wants to be an author, and thus writes many different short stories and poems. He is aloof and is reluctant to join the Ghostwriter team at first. Rob is often impulsive and frequently gets himself in dangerous situations. He gets himself trapped in an abandoned subway tunnel, tied up by a maniacal stunt actress, and is nearly assaulted by a street gang when he enters their hideout. Rob has a strained relationship with his father as he wishes that Rob played more sports instead of spent his free time writing. Rob's family later moves to Australia after the "Lost in Brooklyn" case due to his mother's job there becoming permanent, and Rob's place on the team is assumed by Héctor.

Major cases for Rob include:

- "To Catch a Creep": Rob is introduced as a suspect, but later "sees" Ghostwriter.
- "Into the Comics": After winning the comics contest, Rob joins the team.
- "To the Light": In searching for his homeless friend Double T (portrayed by David Patrick Kelly), Rob is trapped in a subway tunnel.
- "Building Bridges": Rob becomes friends with a former gang member and is attacked in the hideout of the former member's gang.
- "Get the Message": Works with Jamal to get the team back together and prevent Ghostwriter from fading away after the discord within the team.
- "Lost in Brooklyn": Rob's last case, moves to Australia.

=== Héctor Carrero ===
Héctor (portrayed by William Hernandez) joins the cast midway through season two. He meets Alex through the Big Brothers mentoring program. He was born in New York City, but grew up in Puerto Rico. He does not read and write English very well. Alex helps Hector in his writing and he is improving after joining the team. Hector particularly enjoys playing handball.

Major cases for Hector include:

- "Lost in Brooklyn": Hector meets the team and Ghostwriter.
- "Who Is Max Mouse?": Hector defeats George, a bully.

=== Casey Austin ===
Casey (portrayed by Lateaka Vinson) joins the cast midway through season two. She is Jamal's younger cousin who lives in Detroit, but comes to live with the Jenkins while her mother Emmeline (Jamal's father's sister), is in the hospital being treated for alcoholism. Casey is a practical joker with a fondness for peanut butter and baseball.

Major cases for Casey include:

- "Don't Stop the Music": Casey is suspected of causing pranks on the set of Lenni's music video; and first "sees" Ghostwriter.
- "Four days of the Cockatoo": Casey returns in this case in a subplot. Involving her mother being sick.
- "Attack of the Slime Monster": Casey enters the team in a contest to write a scary story about "Gooey Gus the Slime Monster".

=== Craig Mitchell ===
Craig Mitchell (portrayed by Jeremy Miller) is an electronics expert, and only appears in the second arc (the pilot arc), "Who Burned Mr. Brinker's Store?" (episodes 6–9). After that case ends, he is never seen or mentioned again.

=== Frank, Catherine, and Lucy ===
Frank Flynn, Catherine Canellan, and Lucy Canellan lived in Jamal's house in 1928; all are the children of Irish immigrants. Catherine and Lucy's father, a physician, was Frank's foster father and mentor in medicine. Ghostwriter helps Frank because of his future importance as a cardiac surgeon and to Jamal's family. Catherine was with him when Ghostwriter appeared in front of him, and he later writes to Lucy to convince her to help Frank.

After the team helped prove his innocence, Frank eventually followed his mentor's footsteps to become a physician and worked at the Brooklyn Children Hospital. He was also a well-known philanthropist in the city who would help lower-class families who could not afford medical care.

He performed a heart surgery on Jamal's father, Reginald "Reggie" Jenkins, when Reggie was four years old. This was pivotal to the formation of the Ghostwriter Team because if Frank had not operated on Reggie, Reggie would have died during his childhood. As a result, Jamal would have never been born and Ghostwriter would never have met Jamal. This meant the other team members would never have met Ghostwriter and the team would never have been formed. Under a causal loop of time travels, the Ghostwriter Team is inadvertently responsible of shaping Frank's life as a physician and his eventual operation on Reggie Jenkins, Jamal's and his sister Danitra's births, their first meeting among each other as seen on the five-part pilot episode "Ghost Story", and other outcomes throughout the series because of the team's existence.

Frank and Catherine are married at some point after they have reached adulthood. Not only has Frank fulfilled his destiny as it should be, but Catherine also becomes a successful mystery novelist. Frank died on May 1, 1992, at the age of 76, a year before the team meets Catherine, and Lucy's fate is never revealed onscreen.

Frank, Catherine, and Lucy only appear in the episode "Just in Time". After that case ends, they are not seen or mentioned again. They were portrayed respectively by Louis Todaro, Grace Johnston, and Stephi Lineburg, and the older version of Catherine was portrayed by Augusta Dabney.

=== Sam and Becky ===
Sam and Becky Wentwood live in the United Kingdom. Their parents own a bed and breakfast. They met Jamal and Ghostwriter while Jamal's family was on vacation in London. They only appear in the episode "A Crime of Two Cities". After that case ends, they are not seen or mentioned again. They were portrayed respectively by Paul Francis and Candace Hallinan.

== Other characters ==
Other characters include:

- Lt. Isaiah McQuade (Mike Hodge), a detective who serves as the Ghostwriter Team's police contact.
- Calvin Ferguson (Wil Horneff in "Ghost Story", Joey Shea thereafter) a narcissistic peer of Alex, Jamal, Lenni, Rob, and later Tina at Hurston Middle School, serving as the Ghostwriter Team's enemy. Calvin is jealous of the team's numerous successes in solving their neighborhood's crimes since "Ghost Story", and is determined to learn their secret, even emulating their investigative methods.
- Jeffrey Baxter (Jon Hershfield), Calvin Ferguson's timid friend and reluctant sidekick.
- Ms. Beatrice Kelly (Ellen Foley), the principal at Zora Neale Hurston Middle School.

The show's numerous guest stars included Patricia Barry as Lana Barnes in “Who’s Who”, Orlagh Cassidy as Officer Cole in “Over a Barrel”, Harry Connick Jr. as himself in “What’s Up with Alex?”, Daisy Fuentes as Rita Rivera (a.k.a. “Galaxy Girl”) in “Am I Blue?”, Annabelle Gurwitch as Jade Morgan in “Don’t Stop the Music”, Bo Jackson as Joseph, an art gallery's security guard in “Get the Message”, Samuel L. Jackson as Jamal's father Reginald "Reggie" Jenkins in the first two cases (later replaced by Dean Irby), Madhur Jaffrey as Dr. Singhla in “Over a Barrel”, David Patrick Kelly as Tommy “Double T” Truborn in “Into the Comics” and “To the Light”, Robin Leach as Marlon Campbell in “Don’t Stop the Music”, Spike Lee as Special Agent Pete in “Into The Comics”, Mark Linn-Baker as a police officer in “Ghost Story”, Charles Mann as Mr. Izzo the Coal Man in “Just in Time”, Melinda Mullins as Fannie Mae Banner in “Over a Barrel”, CeCe Peniston as herself in “Attack of the Slime Monster”, Judge Reinhold as Brett Pierce in “Am I Blue?”, Salt-N-Pepa as themselves in “Don’t Stop the Music”, Julia Stiles as Erica Dansby in “Who Is Max Mouse?” and “A Crime of Two Cities” and Max Wright as Mr. Brinker in “Who Burned Mr. Brinker’s Store?”.
