= List of Ghostwriter episodes =

Ghostwriter is a children's television series created by Liz Nelson and produced by the Children's Television Workshop (now known as Sesame Workshop) and BBC One. It aired on PBS from October 4, 1992, to February 12, 1995. The series revolves around a close-knit circle of friends from Brooklyn who solve neighborhood crimes and mysteries as a team of young detectives with the help of an invisible ghost. The ghost can communicate with the kids only by manipulating whatever text and letters he can find and using them to form words and sentences. The series was filmed on location in Fort Greene, Brooklyn.

== Series overview ==
| Season | Episodes | Originally released | |
| Season | Episodes | First released | Last released |
|---|---|---|---|
| 1 | 34 | October 4, 1992 | May 16, 1993 |
| 2 | 28 | September 12, 1993 | April 24, 1994 |
| Special | | September 18, 1994 | |
| 3 | 12 | September 25, 1994 | February 12, 1995 |

== Episodes ==
=== Season 1 (1992–93) ===
| No. overall | No. in season | Title | Story arc no. | Directed by | Written by | PBS air date | BBC air date |
|---|---|---|---|---|---|---|---|
| 1 | 1 | "Ghost Story" | 1 | Gilbert Moses | Kermit Frazier | October 4, 1992 | September 16, 1992 |
| 2 | 2 | "Ghost Story" | 1 | Gilbert Moses | Kermit Frazier | October 4, 1992 | September 23, 1992 |
| 3 | 3 | "Ghost Story" | 1 | Gilbert Moses | Kermit Frazier | October 11, 1992 | September 30, 1992 |
| 4 | 4 | "Ghost Story" | 1 | Gilbert Moses | Kermit Frazier | October 18, 1992 | October 07, 1992 |
| 5 | 5 | "Ghost Story" | 1 | Gilbert Moses | Kermit Frazier | October 25, 1992 | October 14, 1992 |
Jamal releases Ghostwriter while cleaning the basement. Jamal, Alex, Lenni, and Gaby come together through the bond of Ghostwriter's mysterious messages to them all. They all come together to solve a rash of mysterious backpack thefts and their connection to a group of gamers calling themselves the THABTOs, an acronym for Two Heads Are Better Than One. The THABTOs are particularly fond of the video game, “Double Defenders” and even call each other by their character names (Mighty Masher, Great Gripper, Rocket Ripper and Kool Kicker). Guest stars: Fran Brill as Mrs. Ferguson, Richard Cox making his first appearance as Max Frazier, Jason Duchesne as THABTO #3 (Rocket Ripper), Shawn Elliott making his first appearance as Mr. Fernández, Cordelia González making her first appearance as Mrs. Fernández, Samaria Graham making her first appearance as Danitra Jenkins, Jarrod Gutman as THABTO #1 (Mighty Masher), Wil Horneff as Calvin Ferguson, Samuel L. Jackson as Reginald “Reggie” Jenkins, Mark Linn-Baker as the policeman, Jake Patellis as THABTO #4 (Kool Kicker), Elizabeth Van Dyke making her first appearance as Doris Jenkins and Lizabeth Zindel as THABTO #2 (Great Gripper): Notes: This story arc and 'To the Light' are the only stories to have five episodes. The rest all conclude in four.; This story arc is not the original pilot. The next arc, 'Who Burned Mr. Brinker's Store?', was produced first and was intended to be the pilot for the series, but wanting a better introduction to the series, the producers decided to add "Ghost Story" at the last minute.; One of four story arcs to be adapted into a book.
| 6 | 6 | "Who Burned Mr. Brinker's Store?" | 2 | Nell Cox | D. J. MacHale | November 1, 1992 | June 08, 1992 |
| 7 | 7 | "Who Burned Mr. Brinker's Store?" | 2 | Nell Cox | D. J. MacHale | November 8, 1992 | June 09, 1992 |
| 8 | 8 | "Who Burned Mr. Brinker's Store?" | 2 | Nell Cox | D. J. MacHale | November 15, 1992 | June 15, 1992 |
| 9 | 9 | "Who Burned Mr. Brinker's Store?" | 2 | Nell Cox | D. J. MacHale | November 22, 1992 | June 16, 1992 |
Jamal is angered when Mr. Brinker (Max Wright), owner of the privately own video rental shop, yells at him. That night, when Brinker's store burns down, the shopkeeper accuses Jamal of arson to cover up his own involvement in the fire, which itself was a cover for a much more serious crime that he committed. Ghostwriter reveals himself to both Craig and Tina. Guest stars: Captain Lou Albano as the taxi driver interviewed by Gaby and Tina, Ira Hawkins as the FBI Agent, Mike Hodge making his first appearance as Lt. McQuade, Samuel L. Jackson as Reginald “Reggie” Jenkins, Jeremy Miller as Craig Mitchell, Armand Schultz as Tony, Eddie Townsend making his first appearance as Momo, Jesse Wollman as the Firecracker Kid and Max Wright as Mr. Brinker: Notes: This story arc was the original pilot. This is evident from the fact that this arc seems to have been filmed inside actual buildings and houses, instead of on a soundstage like the rest of the series. Other indications include Ghostwriter appearing as a plain star instead of the trademark logo and using only the word RALLY without an initial when calling for a group meeting. Also, the main cast members appear much younger than they did in "Ghost Story".; Craig does not appear again in the series and is never referred to again. It is unknown whether it had anything to do with this being the pilot episode.; Lieutenant Isaiah McQuade (Mike Hodge) makes his first appearance as a recurring character. Although he introduced himself as working for the Arsons and Explosives Division of an NYPD precinct, he later gets called by the team to help investigate other kinds of crimes.
| 10 | 10 | "To Catch a Creep" | 3 | Maureen Thorp | Story by : Fracaswell Hyman; Teleplay by : Pamela Douglas | November 29, 1992 | January 13, 1993 |
| 11 | 11 | "To Catch a Creep" | 3 | Maureen Thorp | Story by : Fracaswell Hyman; Teleplay by : Pamela Douglas | December 6, 1992 | January 20, 1993 |
| 12 | 12 | "To Catch a Creep" | 3 | Maureen Thorp | Story by : Fracaswell Hyman; Teleplay by : Pamela Douglas | December 13, 1992 | January 27, 1993 |
| 13 | 13 | "To Catch a Creep" | 3 | Maureen Thorp | Story by : Fracaswell Hyman; Teleplay by : Pamela Douglas | December 20, 1992 | February 03, 1993 |
Alex has aspirations to become class president, but one of his competitors starts a smear campaign, putting up fliers with embarrassing personal secrets. One of the initial suspects is new transfer student Rob (Todd Alexander), because of his withdrawn nature, but that status changes once Ghostwriter reveals himself to him. Eventually Alex realizes that one of his many pen pals might be involved in the dirty politics, and might be leaking info to the real dirty politician, Calvin Ferguson (Joey Shea), whose main goal is to keep Alex from winning. Guest stars: Ernest Abuba as Sensei Baba, Richard Cox as Max Frazier, Ellen Foley making her first appearance as Ms. Kelly, Apryl R. Foster as Janet Williams, Cordelia González as Mrs. Fernández, Jon Herschfield making his first appearance as Jeffrey Baxter, Dulé Hill as a basketball player during two episodes, Sreela Roy as Neetu Kapoor, Joey Shea making his first appearance as Calvin Ferguson and Hanh-Tien Le Tran making her first appearance as Linda Nguyen: Notes: Rob joins the cast in this story arc.; Wil Horneff, who previously played Calvin Ferguson in the story arc "Ghost Story", is replaced by Joey Shea, beginning with this story arc.
| 14 | 14 | "Into the Comics" | 4 | Gregory Lehane | Alexa Junge and Kermit Frazier | December 27, 1992 | February 10, 1993 |
| 15 | 15 | "Into the Comics" | 4 | Gregory Lehane | Alexa Junge and Kermit Frazier | January 3, 1993 | February 24, 1993 |
| 16 | 16 | "Into the Comics" | 4 | Gregory Lehane | Alexa Junge and Kermit Frazier | January 10, 1993 | March 03, 1993 |
| 17 | 17 | "Into the Comics" | 4 | Gregory Lehane | Alexa Junge and Kermit Frazier | January 17, 1993 | March 10, 1993 |
Lenni persuades the team to enter a scavenger hunt-style contest in order to win the chance to be drawn into an issue of “Hoodman.” Their efforts are hindered by an embittered comic book artist named Manfred “Manny” Gite (Mike Jefferson), who will stop at nothing to win the contest disguised as his own character, Stoopdude. Meanwhile, Rob continues to be distant from the team, but makes friends with an eccentric homeless poet named Tommy Truborn (nicknamed “Double T”). Guest stars: Lisa Arrindell as Special Agent Norma, Steve Boles as Kyle Cameron, Jr., Shawn Elliott as Mr. Fernández, Bemi Faison as Carlos, Cordelia González as Mrs. Fernández, Yvette Hawkins as Aunt Wilhelmina Burns, David Patrick Kelly making his first appearance as Double T, Caroline Lagerfelt making her first appearance as Sally Lewis, Mike Jefferson as Manfred “Manny” Gite/Stoopdude, Spike Lee as Special Agent Pete, Afi McClendon as Teresa, Crayton Robey as Randall Chandler, Eric Swanson as Special Agent Harlan, Byron Uttley as Hoodman, Sharon Washington as Special Agent Marlene and Dan Ziskie making his first appearance as Colonel Baker
| 18 | 18 | "To the Light" | 5 | Maureen Thorp | Story by : Matthew Witten & Miranda Barry & Fracaswell Hyman; Teleplay by : Pamela Douglas | January 24, 1993 | April 28, 1993 |
| 19 | 19 | "To the Light" | 5 | Maureen Thorp | Story by : Matthew Witten & Miranda Barry & Fracaswell Hyman; Teleplay by : Pamela Douglas | January 31, 1993 | May 05, 1993 |
| 20 | 20 | "To the Light" | 5 | Maureen Thorp | Story by : Matthew Witten & Miranda Barry & Fracaswell Hyman; Teleplay by : Pamela Douglas | February 7, 1993 | May 12, 1993 |
| 21 | 21 | "To the Light" | 5 | Maureen Thorp | Story by : Matthew Witten & Miranda Barry & Fracaswell Hyman; Teleplay by : Pamela Douglas | February 14, 1993 | May 19, 1993 |
| 22 | 22 | "To the Light" | 5 | Maureen Thorp | Story by : Matthew Witten & Miranda Barry & Fracaswell Hyman; Teleplay by : Pamela Douglas | February 21, 1993 | May 26, 1993 |
Rob takes Jamal to meet Double T, but they find his usual spot trashed and the poet missing. After tracking down Double T's daughter Lisa (Kristy Graves), she and Rob trace his usual hangouts, but wind up trapped in a subway cave-in. Rob relies on his wits and Ghostwriter to try to get help and continue the hunt for Double T, while the rest of the team use some of Double T's poems and learn of his service in the Vietnam War, to assist in the search. Guest stars: Shawn Elliott as Mr. Fernández, Richard Eng making his first appearance as Mr. Nguyen, Kristy Graves as Lisa Norburt, John Griesemer as Hush, Mihran Guilin as Mr. Meherhan, Dean Irby making his first appearance as Reginald “Reggie” Jenkins, David Patrick Kelly as Double T, Paul Lee as the security guard, Conrad Roberts as Bertrin Braithwaite, Ginny Yang making her first appearance as Mrs. Nguyen, Pon Yang as the elderly man and Dan Ziskie as Colonel Baker: Note: This story arc and "Ghost Story" are the only stories to have five episodes. The remaining arcs in the series all conclude in four.
| 23 | 23 | "Who's Who" | 6 | Maureen Thorp | Fracaswell Hyman | February 28, 1993 | June 02, 1993 |
| 24 | 24 | "Who's Who" | 6 | Maureen Thorp | Fracaswell Hyman | March 7, 1993 | June 09, 1993 |
| 25 | 25 | "Who's Who" | 6 | Maureen Thorp | Fracaswell Hyman | March 14, 1993 | June 16, 1993 |
| 26 | 26 | "Who's Who" | 6 | Maureen Thorp | Fracaswell Hyman | March 21, 1993 | June 17, 1993 |
Tina is excited when she lands a job answering fan mail to her favorite actress, Lana Barnes (Patricia Barry). However, when she starts reading threatening and disturbing notes, she begins to worry. Lana waves off her fears as just letters from a very devoted fan, until she narrowly avoids suffocating in a locked garage. The Ghostwriter Team begin a search for Lana's stalker before her acceptance of an award. Suspects are aplenty as many people from Lana's past, including family members, and other movie stars have reason to hold grudges against Lana, but the one person who holds the biggest grudge of all is Lana’s stunt double, Roberta Halton (Elaine Kussack). Guest stars: Patricia Barry as Lana Barnes, Shawn Elliott as Mr. Fernández, Samaria Graham as Danitra Jenkins, Mike Hodge as Lt. McQuade, Fracaswell Hyman as Mr. Swarmworth, Gretchen Krich as Janine Peretti, Elaine Kussack as Roberta Halton, John McMartin as Alan Charles, Valerie Perrine as April Flowers, Sam Stoneburner as Stone Harrison, Elizabeth Van Dyke as Doris Jenkins and Ginny Yang as Mrs. Nguyen
| 27 | 27 | "Over a Barrel" | 7 | Gregory Lehane | Story by : Edward Gallardo & Carin Greenberg Baker; Teleplay by : Edward Gallardo | March 28, 1993 | September 22, 1993 |
| 28 | 28 | "Over a Barrel" | 7 | Gregory Lehane | Story by : Edward Gallardo & Carin Greenberg Baker; Teleplay by : Edward Gallardo | April 4, 1993 | September 29, 1993 |
| 29 | 29 | "Over a Barrel" | 7 | Gregory Lehane | Story by : Edward Gallardo & Carin Greenberg Baker; Teleplay by : Edward Gallardo | April 11, 1993 | October 06, 1993 |
| 30 | 30 | "Over a Barrel" | 7 | Gregory Lehane | Story by : Edward Gallardo & Carin Greenberg Baker; Teleplay by : Edward Gallardo | April 18, 1993 | October 13, 1993 |
The team is hard at work at the community garden center when a series of health problems arise: Gaby passes out, several other kids and adults get sick, and even some rabbits die. It's soon learned that a chemical, tetrachloroethylene (commonly known as "perc") has been illegally dumped in the ground under the garden and is to blame. As the authorities cannot remove the barrels in a reasonable amount of time, unless the guilty party is tracked down, the team sets off to find the person responsible for such a dirty act. Investigation eventually leads to a local philanthropist named John Miller (Brian Reddy), who may not be the "Citizen of the Year" that he seems. Guest stars: Orlagh Cassidy as Officer Cole, Richard Cox as Max Frazier, Shawn Elliott as Mr. Fernández, Richard Eng as Mr. Nguyen, Rex Everhart as Ralph Dugan, Madhur Jaffrey as Dr. Singhla, Caroline Lagerfelt as Sally Lewis, Melinda Mullins as Fannie Mae Banner, Brian Reddy as John Miller, Eddie Townsend as Momo, Hanh-Tien Le Tran as Linda Nguyen, Elizabeth Van Dyke as Doris Jenkins, Ginny Yang as Mrs. Nguyen and Welly Yang making his first appearance as Tuan Nguyen
| 31 | 31 | "Building Bridges" | 8 | Maureen Thorp | Kermit Frazier | April 25, 1993 | January 12, 1994 |
| 32 | 32 | "Building Bridges" | 8 | Maureen Thorp | Kermit Frazier | May 2, 1993 | January 19, 1994 |
| 33 | 33 | "Building Bridges" | 8 | Maureen Thorp | Kermit Frazier | May 9, 1993 | January 26, 1994 |
| 34 | 34 | "Building Bridges" | 8 | Maureen Thorp | Kermit Frazier | May 16, 1993 | February 02, 1994 |
Plans for the school's talent show are threatened by gang violence in the neighborhood. Kids start coming to school with black eyes and bandages, and then the school's hallway gets tagged by graffiti artists. Rob's new friend, Victor Torres, a former member of the gang who had quit after his brother became permanently disabled after a gang war, appears to be the prime suspect, but Rob is determined to prove that someone is out to frame Victor. A student named Tony Boyd (Greg Young) holds a personal grudge against Victor due to the latter being a faster runner on the school’s track team than the former. Guest stars: Eugene Byrd as Walter Haines, Ellen Foley as Ms. Kelly, Damon Harris as Kiambu, Keith Hernandez as Mr. Richards, Joe Herrera as Quincy Torres, Afi McClendon as Jasmine Michaluk, Victor Sierra making his first appearance as Victor Torres, José Soto as Miguel Ramos, Kirk Taylor as Mr. Ward and Greg Young as Tony Boyd

=== Season 2 (1993–94) ===
| No. overall | No. in season | Title | Story arc no. | Directed by | Written by | PBS air date | BBC air date |
|---|---|---|---|---|---|---|---|
| 35 | 1 | "Am I Blue?" | 9 | Susan Dansby | Fracaswell Hyman | September 12, 1993 | October 20, 1993 |
| 36 | 2 | "Am I Blue?" | 9 | Susan Dansby | Fracaswell Hyman | September 19, 1993 | November 03, 1993 |
| 37 | 3 | "Am I Blue?" | 9 | Susan Dansby | Fracaswell Hyman | September 26, 1993 | November 10, 1993 |
| 38 | 4 | "Am I Blue?" | 9 | Susan Dansby | Fracaswell Hyman | October 3, 1993 | November 17, 1993 |
“Galaxy Girl,” Gaby's favorite action hero, is coming to town, and Gaby "borrows" some money from her parents' Bodega to buy a costume. When she learns she cannot return it, she realizes she must fess up. She gets into more hot water when a valuable model spaceship from the show is stolen and winds up in her room. Someone is framing Gaby and somehow the whole story arc may just be a fancy game of Hyperball, the infamous “Galaxy Girl” game, initiated by someone who is determined to teach the producer of "Galaxy Girl" a lesson. Guest stars: Shawn Elliott as Mr. Fernández, Daisy Fuentes as Rita Rivera/Galaxy Girl, Cordelia González as Mrs. Fernández, Paul Hecht as the “Galaxy Girl” TV Announcer, Jon Herschfield as Jeffrey Baxter, Mike Hodge as Lt. McQuade and the Makva Overlord, Robert Lydiard as the voices of the Kija and Cutesie, Afi McClendon as Jasmine Michaluk, Vince O’Brien as Bruce Baron, Judge Reinhold as Brett Pierce, Eddie Robinson as Lamont Sampson and Joey Shea as Calvin Ferguson
| 39 | 5 | "Get the Message" | 10 | Maureen Thorp | Carin Greenberg Baker | October 10, 1993 | February 09, 1994 |
| 40 | 6 | "Get the Message" | 10 | Maureen Thorp | Carin Greenberg Baker | October 17, 1993 | February 23, 1994 |
| 41 | 7 | "Get the Message" | 10 | Maureen Thorp | Carin Greenberg Baker | October 24, 1993 | March 02, 1994 |
| 42 | 8 | "Get the Message" | 10 | Maureen Thorp | Carin Greenberg Baker | October 31, 1993 | March 09, 1994 |
The Ghostwriter team begins to fall apart when arguments and misunderstandings stemming from a car accident between Mr. Fernández and Mr. Frazier start to form between the team members. Lenni sides with her father, and Alex and Gaby side with their father. Tina is also involved because she had witnessed the accident and had unintentionally provided testimony against Mr. Fernández to the press. While Jamal tries to ease increasing tensions, Rob withdraws, unable to handle the fighting. The rift starts to make Ghostwriter fade away, and Calvin Ferguson makes things worse by trying to investigate who 'GW' is (he caught Rob talking to "GW" in school) and makes attempts to further sabotage the team. Rob eventually helps Jamal get the team back together in time to solve the mystery of an art thief, as the culprit Daniel O'Connor (Jonathan Salinger) may also be indirectly responsible for the car accident. The story arc ends with an unknown hand writing a distress call, causing Ghostwriter to abruptly leave the team. Guest stars: Richard Cox as Max Frazier, Shawn Elliott as Mr. Fernández, Cordelia González as Mrs. Fernández, Mike Hodge as Lt. McQuade, Bo Jackson as Joseph, the Art Gallery Security Guard, Reggie Montgomery as Darryl Thomas, Jonathan Salinger as Daniel O'Connor and Joey Shea as Calvin Ferguson: Note: This is the only story arc to end with a cliffhanger into the next one.
| 43 | 9 | "Just in Time" | 11 | Gregory Lehane | Fracaswell Hyman | November 7, 1993 | September 21, 1994 |
| 44 | 10 | "Just in Time" | 11 | Gregory Lehane | Fracaswell Hyman | November 14, 1993 | September 28, 1994 |
| 45 | 11 | "Just in Time" | 11 | Gregory Lehane | Fracaswell Hyman | November 21, 1993 | October 05, 1994 |
| 46 | 12 | "Just in Time" | 11 | Gregory Lehane | Fracaswell Hyman | November 28, 1993 | October 12, 1994 |
The hand writing the distress call to Ghostwriter belongs to Frank Flynn, a boy who lived in Jamal's house in 1928. Ghostwriter's strength is pushed to its limits when he has to time travel from Jamal and the team in 1993, to Frank and his best friend Catherine Canellan in 1928, and back, in order to help Frank clear his name in the theft of a priceless tea set, as if he is not cleared, he will be sent to live in an orphanage. Meanwhile, Jamal learns his dad is getting very sick, and clearing Frank's name may be the only link to his recovery, as he played an important role in Jamal's father's childhood. Guest stars: Cynthia Crumlish as Mrs. O'Boyle, Augusta Dabney as Catherine Canellan-Flynn, William Hill as Raynard Wilcox, Dean Irby as Reginald “Reggie” Jenkins, Grace Johnston as Catherine Canellan, Laurie Klatscher as the Librarian, Stephi Lineburg as Lucy Canellan, Charles Mann as Mr. Izzo, Thomas Schall as Dr. Canellan, and Louis Todaro as Frank Flynn: Notes: Ghostwriter reveals himself to Frank, Catherine, and Lucy in this story arc.; Catherine Canellan-Flynn is the only adult ever to see Ghostwriter during the series.; Although credited, Rob does not appear in this story arc. He is mentioned by Lenni to be on vacation with his family in Australia.; One of four story arcs to be adapted into a book. The episode takes place in 1993, the original air date. The book adaptation's current time is 1996, the year it was published.
| 47 | 13 | "Lost in Brooklyn" | 12 | Susan Dansby | Kermit Frazier | December 5, 1993 | April 26, 1995 |
| 48 | 14 | "Lost in Brooklyn" | 12 | Susan Dansby | Kermit Frazier | December 12, 1993 | May 03, 1995 |
| 49 | 15 | "Lost in Brooklyn" | 12 | Susan Dansby | Kermit Frazier | December 19, 1993 | May 10, 1995 |
| 50 | 16 | "Lost in Brooklyn" | 12 | Susan Dansby | Kermit Frazier | December 26, 1993 | May 17, 1995 |
Tina befriends a foreign exchange student, Safira Simango (Madala Hilaire), from Mozambique, whose father is an important ambassador. Their family has had a serious rift, and her brother, Malenga, fled to America after an argument with their dad. Safira intends to find her brother, having written letters to each other since he fled, but in her search, she herself becomes lost and in a dangerous position. Meanwhile, Rob learns he has to move to Australia. Alex's new friend Héctor (William Hernandez) meets Ghostwriter and goes on to take Rob's place on the team. Guest stars: K. Todd Freeman as Malenga Simango, Nicholas Garrett as Mohammed, Paul Garrett as Oko, Madalla Hilaire as Safira Simango, Brenda Pressley as Mrs. Simango, Cathy Rigby as Ms. Dozier, Hahn Tien Le Tran as Linda Nguyen, Alan Tung as Mr. Tung, Ginny Yang as Mrs. Nguyen and Cedric Young as Mr. Simango: Notes: Ghostwriter reveals himself to Héctor in this story arc.; Rob leaves the series and Héctor joins the cast in this arc.
| 51 | 17 | "Who Is Max Mouse?" | 13 | Maureen Thorp | Miranda Barry | January 2, 1994 | January 18, 1995 |
| 52 | 18 | "Who Is Max Mouse?" | 13 | Maureen Thorp | Miranda Barry | January 9, 1994 | January 25, 1995 |
| 53 | 19 | "Who Is Max Mouse?" | 13 | Maureen Thorp | Miranda Barry | January 16, 1994 | February 01, 1995 |
| 54 | 20 | "Who Is Max Mouse?" | 13 | Maureen Thorp | Miranda Barry | January 23, 1994 | February 08, 1995 |
A hacker who goes by the name, Max Mouse, online invades Hurston School's computer mainframe, causing frequent fire drills, threatening messages, and altering the grades of Jamal and Lenni. The team gets a 'crash' course in the Internet in its cruder and more basic form, including chat rooms and bulletin boards, sending Ghostwriter through the computer and phone lines in an attempt to catch Max Mouse and stop his reign of mischief, as well as catch the student, Janice Hall (Danielle McGovern), responsible for infecting the system. Guest stars: Richard Cox as Max Frazier, Ellen Foley as Ms. Kelly, Greg Lee as Mr. Aucoin, Darlene Love as the Librarian, Frank McClean as George, Afi McClendon as Jasmine Michaluk, Danielle McGovern as Janice Hall, Jesse Moore making his first appearance as Mr. Johnston, Joey Shea as Calvin Ferguson and Julia Stiles making her first appearance as Erica Dansby.
| 55 | 21 | "Don't Stop the Music" | 14 | Susan Dansby | Carin Greenberg Baker | January 30, 1994 | February 15, 1995 |
| 56 | 22 | "Don't Stop the Music" | 14 | Susan Dansby | Carin Greenberg Baker | February 6, 1994 | March 01, 1995 |
| 57 | 23 | "Don't Stop the Music" | 14 | Susan Dansby | Carin Greenberg Baker | February 13, 1994 | March 08, 1995 |
| 58 | 24 | "Don't Stop the Music" | 14 | Susan Dansby | Carin Greenberg Baker | February 20, 1994 | March 15, 1995 |
Lenni gets the chance of a lifetime when a hip music producer wants to sign her to the Smash Records label and produce a music video for MTV. Lenni struggles to come up with an original song, but then nails one out of the park with a song called "You Gotta Believe". Lenni and the entire Ghostwriter Team get to go on-set for the filming of the video, but a series of strange accidents happen. It turns out that the target is not Lenni, but Jade, her producer. The team wrestles with the mystery of the accidents, as well as trying to babysit Jamal's cousin, Casey (Lateaka Vinson), who ends up meeting Ghostwriter. Guest stars: Thomas Ciriacks as Avatar, Annabelle Gurwitch as Jade Morgan, Mia Korf as Sonia Ivey, Caroline Lagerfelt as Sally Lewis, Ellen Lancaster as the Photographer, Keith Langsdale making his first appearance as Max Frazier, Robert LuPone as David Keeler, Jake Turner as Leif Shaunessy and cameos from Hip-Hop trio Salt-N-Pepa, MTV VJ’s Ed Lover and Doctor Dré, singer-songwriter, Sybil, rappers, Positive K and Daddy-O and rap duo, Get Set V.O.P. Victor Sierra also reprises his role as Victor Torres, and Dennis Starolselsky as Kevin Michaels and Oren Sofer as Spencer make cameos to foreshadow the next story arc.: Notes: Ghostwriter reveals himself to Casey and she joins the cast in this story arc.; Richard Cox, who previously played the role of Max Frazier, Lenni's dad, is replaced by Keith Langsdale, beginning with this story arc.
| 59 | 25 | "What's Up with Alex?" | 15 | Maureen Thorp | Fracaswell Hyman and Candido Tirado | April 3, 1994 | May 24, 1995 |
| 60 | 26 | "What's Up with Alex?" | 15 | Maureen Thorp | Fracaswell Hyman and Candido Tirado | April 10, 1994 | June 07, 1995 |
| 61 | 27 | "What's Up with Alex?" | 15 | Maureen Thorp | Fracaswell Hyman and Candido Tirado | April 17, 1994 | June 14, 1995 |
| 62 | 28 | "What's Up with Alex?" | 15 | Maureen Thorp | Fracaswell Hyman and Candido Tirado | April 24, 1994 | June 21, 1995 |
Alex becomes detached and moody with Gaby and the team, upon joining the three-man basketball team the Dragons. Also, a series of drug-related locker break-ins make them worry Alex may be involved with drugs. Guest stars: Shawn Elliott as Mr. Fernández, Iliana Guibert making her first appearance as Mrs. Fernández, Jon Hershfield as Jeffrey Baxter, Julia Jordan as Delilah, Kelly Kristjanson as Mary Jo, Damien Leake as Mr. Oliver, Patricia Mauceri as Mrs. Michaels, Jesse Moore as Mr. Johnston, Elan Rivera as Maria, Victor Sierra reprising his role as Victor Torres, Oren Sofer as Spencer, Dennis Starolselsky as Kevin Michaels, Mike Starr as Big Ralph, Jesse Tendler as Arnie and Z. Wright as making his first appearance as Jason: Notes: This story arc aired both on PBS and in broadcast syndication with a preface read out by the actors portraying Gaby (Mayteana Morales) and Mr. Fernandez (Shawn Elliott) before the start of each part.; Cordelia González, who previously played the role of Estella Fernandez, Alex and Gaby's mom, is replaced by Iliana Guibert in this story arc.; The series’ composer, Gail Sky King wrote a song for this story arc entitled “There’s a Light” which was sung near the end of the arc’s fourth and final episode by Twisted Sister’s lead vocalist, Dee Snider.

=== Special (1994) ===
| Title | Directed by | Written by | PBS air date | BBC air date |
|---|---|---|---|---|
| "The Ghostwriter 3-peat Special" | Gregory Lehane | Miranda Barry | September 18, 1994 | Unaired |
Katie Couric visits the set of Ghostwriter and interviews Blaze Berdahl (Lenni) and Sheldon Turnipseed (Jamal), discussing the storylines for the forthcoming third season, as well as showing clips of the new episodes, screen tests and bloopers. Couric also has an interview with Melissa González, the new actress playing Gaby in season 3.: Note: Most PBS stations aired the special the week before or the week of pledge drive time, when the stations normally pre-empted Ghostwriter for two weeks.

=== Season 3 (1994–95) ===
| No. overall | No. in season | Title | Story arc no. | Directed by | Written by | PBS air date | BBC air date |
|---|---|---|---|---|---|---|---|
| 63 | 1 | "A Crime of Two Cities" | 16 | Gregory Lehane | Kermit Frazier | September 25, 1994 | October 19, 1994 |
| 64 | 2 | "A Crime of Two Cities" | 16 | Gregory Lehane | Kermit Frazier | October 2, 1994 | November 02, 1994 |
| 65 | 3 | "A Crime of Two Cities" | 16 | Gregory Lehane | Kermit Frazier | October 9, 1994 | November 09, 1994 |
| 66 | 4 | "A Crime of Two Cities" | 16 | Gregory Lehane | Kermit Frazier | October 16, 1994 | November 16, 1994 |
Jamal is vacationing in London with his parents and they are staying in the bed and breakfast owned by the Wentwood family. While there, Jamal befriends the Wentwoods' children, Sam and Becky. Using Ghostwriter to send messages back and forth across the Atlantic Ocean, they work together with the rest of the team to uncover a plot to kidnap the son of a famous author. Guest stars: Tobie Brydon as Gloria Brockington (a.k.a. G.B. Owens), Ray Collins as the Police Officer, Craig Edwards as Danny Winkler, Paul Francis as Sam, Candace Hallinan as Becky, Anthony Heald as Mr. Wentwood, Mike Hodge as Lt. McQuade, Pauline Melville as Wise Rita, Dean Irby as Reginald "Reggie" Jenkins, Afi McClendon as Jasmine Michaluk, Bryan Shilowich as Colin Brockington, Julia Stiles as Erica Dansby, Elizabeth Van Dyke as Doris Jenkins, Barbara Eda Young as Mrs. Wentwood, Z. Wright as Jason and cameos by Ahmad Rashad, Phylicia Rashad and Condola Rashad as themselves.: Notes: Ghostwriter reveals himself to Sam and Becky.; This is Mayteana Morales' last story arc playing Gaby.; One of four stories to be adapted into a book.
| 67 | 5 | "Four Days of the Cockatoo" | 17 | Gregory Lehane | Story by : Carin Greenberg Baker & Fracaswell Hyman & Eric Weiner; Teleplay by : Pamela Douglas & Fracaswell Hyman & Eric Weiner | October 30, 1994 | Unaired |
| 68 | 6 | "Four Days of the Cockatoo" | 17 | Gregory Lehane | Story by : Carin Greenberg Baker & Fracaswell Hyman & Eric Weiner; Teleplay by : Pamela Douglas & Fracaswell Hyman & Eric Weiner | November 6, 1994 | Unaired |
| 69 | 7 | "Four Days of the Cockatoo" | 17 | Gregory Lehane | Story by : Carin Greenberg Baker & Fracaswell Hyman & Eric Weiner; Teleplay by : Pamela Douglas & Fracaswell Hyman & Eric Weiner | November 13, 1994 | Unaired |
| 70 | 8 | "Four Days of the Cockatoo" | 17 | Gregory Lehane | Story by : Carin Greenberg Baker & Fracaswell Hyman & Eric Weiner; Teleplay by : Pamela Douglas & Fracaswell Hyman & Eric Weiner | November 20, 1994 | Unaired |
Gaby discovers a rare bird not realizing that it is sought by smugglers, taxidermist Aubodon Poulet (Kevin Chamberlin) and his assistant Honey Hawke (Alyson Reed) determined to claim the bird as their latest taxidermy prize. Guest stars: Bob Amaral as Ambrose Chappelle/Man #2, Kevin Chamberlin as Audobon Poulet, Shawn Elliott as Mr. Fernández, Mike Hodge as Lt. McQuade, Michelle Hurd as Emmaline Lewis, Dean Irby as Reginald “Reggie” Jenkins, Moonlight as Calypso, Alyson Reed as Honey Hawke, Joey Shea as Calvin Ferguson, Eric Swanson as Ed Atkins/Man #1, Elizabeth Van Dyke as Doris Jenkins, and Deborah Watkins as Honey Stunt Double: Note: Melissa González portrays Gaby, beginning with this story arc.
| 71 | 9 | "Attack of the Slime Monster" | 18 | Maureen Thorp | Carin Greenberg Baker | January 22, 1995 | Unaired |
| 72 | 10 | "Attack of the Slime Monster" | 18 | Maureen Thorp | Carin Greenberg Baker | January 29, 1995 | Unaired |
| 73 | 11 | "Attack of the Slime Monster" | 18 | Maureen Thorp | Carin Greenberg Baker | February 5, 1995 | Unaired |
| 74 | 12 | "Attack of the Slime Monster" | 18 | Maureen Thorp | Carin Greenberg Baker | February 12, 1995 | Unaired |
The team helps Casey write her own story for a contest revolving around the "Gooey Gus" doll. Guest stars: Shawn Elliott as Mr. Fernández, Keith Langsdale as Max Frazier, CeCe Peniston as herself, Byron Uttley and Phillip Buch as the two slime monsters and Welly Yang as Tuan Nguyen: Note: One of four story arcs to be adapted into a book.

== Home releases ==
During the mid-1990s Ghostwriter was released on VHS by two different companies, GPN and Republic Pictures. GPN is the company authorized by PBS to release all its shows on video. They have the entire series except for the last two cases. These videos are in the original format with each case divided into four episodes (except case 1 and 5, where they're divided in five). Republic Pictures released only three cases (all from the first season): "Ghost Story", "Who Burned Mr. Brinker's Store?" and "Into the Comics". In Republic Pictures' version, the four or five episodes for each case were edited together into a feature-length film. The Republic Pictures version is currently out of print, but can still be found in some libraries in the US and Canada only. The GPN version was available to the general public for purchase through their website until 2007. Starting in mid-2007, GPN was selling only to schools and libraries due to a change in licensing terms, but the GPN version is still available in some libraries.

The first season of Ghostwriter was released on DVD by Shout! Factory. The five-disc set, running 870 minutes long, was released on June 8, 2010, featuring a trivia game and a casebook as bonus materials.
