= Melinda Mullins =

American actress

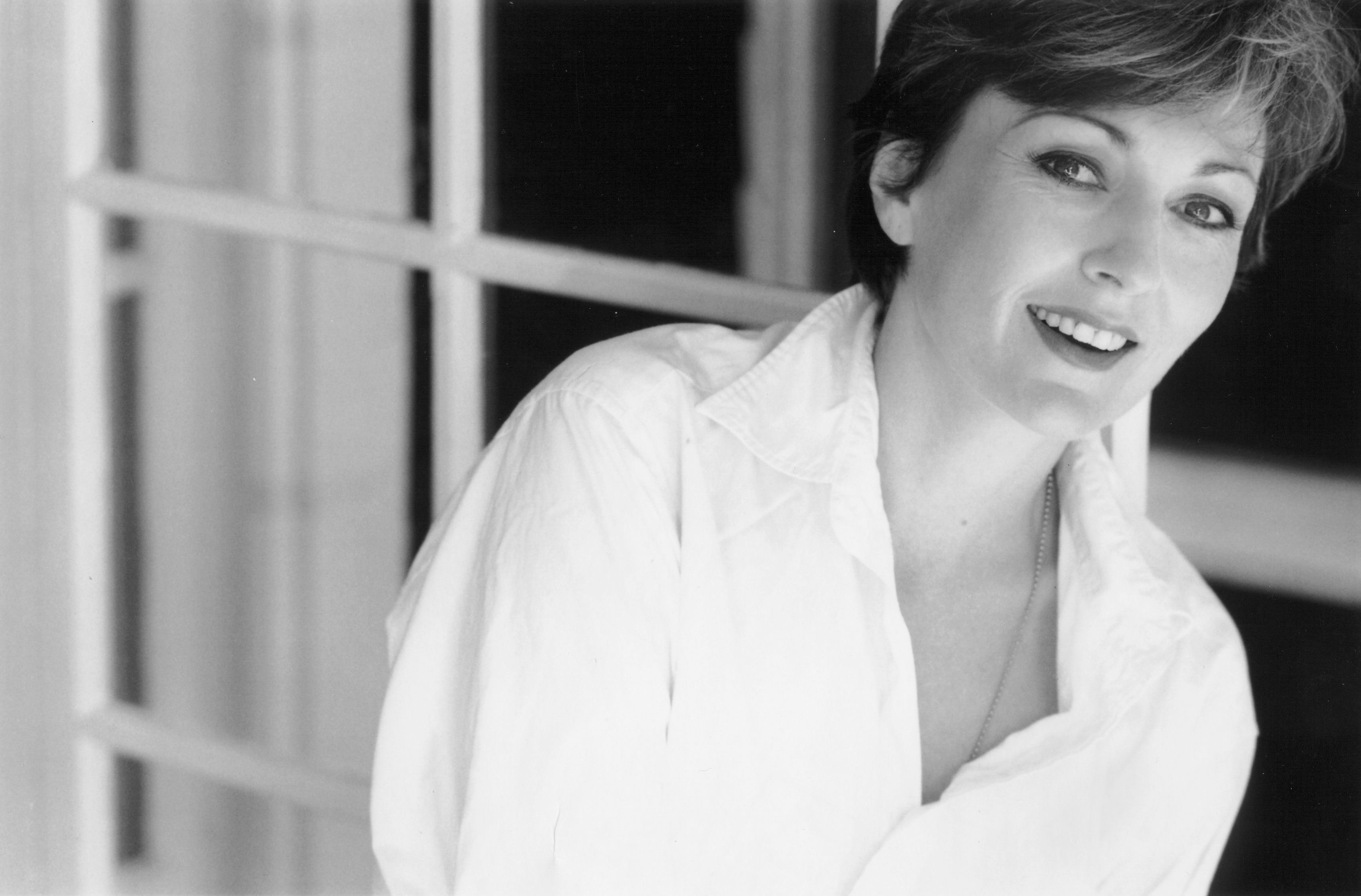
- Mullins c. 1995
- Occupation: Actress
- Years active: 1979−1998
- Spouse: Joshua Bryant (m. 2005; died 2024)

Melinda Mullins is an American former film, television and theatre actress.

== Career ==
Mullins has appeared in numerous roles in film, television and on the Broadway stage. While appearing in several TV series, such as M*A*S*H and Law & Order, Mullins may be best known for her role as former Broadway leading lady Hilary Booth in Rupert Holmes' Remember WENN. Mullins, who also writes screenplays and short stories, was married to actor/author Joshua Bryant, who appeared as Jack Scully on M*A*S*H, since 2005; the couple moved to France in 2018. Bryant died on June 25, 2024.

== Filmography ==
Film
Year	Title	Role	Notes
1989	Prisoners of Inertia	Charlotte	
1991	What About Bob?	Marie Grady	
1993	Best Offer	Older Kyle (voice)	Short
1993	Dennis the Menace	Andrea	
1996	Rescuing Desire	Toni	

Television
Year	Title	Role	Notes
1982	M*A*S*H	Martine LeClerc	Episode: "Foreign Affairs"
1987	Crossbow	Blade	Season 1 (recurring, 6 episodes)
1990	As the World Turns	Rita Donley	Episode 8958
1992	Law & Order	Forensics Technician	Episode: "Vengeance"
1993	Ghostwriter	Fannie Mae Banner	Episodes: "Over a Barrel" (Parts 2 & 4)
1995	Law & Order	Chris Chappel	Episode: "Act of God"
1996–98	Remember WENN	Hilary Booth	Seasons 1–4 (regular, 56 episodes)
1997	The City	Pamela	Episodes 296 & 333
1998	American Experience	Jane Fisher (voice)	Episode: "Mr. Miami Beach"

== Broadway ==
- Mastergate (Merry Chase)
- Serious Money (Scilla)
- Sherlock's Last Case (Liza/Damion)

== Off-Broadway and Regional ==
- Escape from Happiness (Elizabeth)
- Titus Andronicus (Tamora)
- Macbeth (Lady Macbeth)
- Adjoining Trances (C. McCullers)
- Measure for Measure (Isabella)
- Midsummer Night's Dream (Titania/Hippolyta)
- Twelfth Night (Olivia)
- The Play's the Thing (Mona)
- Wild Oats (Honest Bob)
- Amerika (Chorus)

== Awards and nominations ==
- 1986 - B.H. Barry Stagefighting Prize
- 1996 - Screen Actors Guild Award Nomination
- 1999 - New York Festival Award: Outstanding Performance in a Comedy Series
- 1999 - Chicago International Television Festival Outstanding Achievement in Acting
