= What About Bob? =

1991 film directed by Frank Oz

- Theatrical release poster
- Directed by: Frank Oz
- Screenplay by: Tom Schulman
- Story by: Alvin Sargent; Laura Ziskin
- Produced by: Laura Ziskin
- Starring: Bill Murray; Richard Dreyfuss; Julie Hagerty; Charlie Korsmo; Kathryn Erbe
- Cinematography: Michael Ballhaus
- Edited by: Anne V. Coates
- Music by: Miles Goodman
- Production company: Touchstone Pictures
- Distributed by: Buena Vista Pictures Distribution
- Release date: May 17, 1991
- Running time: 99 minutes
- Country: United States
- Language: English
- Budget: $39 million
- Box office: $63.7 million (US)

What About Bob? is a 1991 American comedy film directed by Frank Oz and starring Bill Murray and Richard Dreyfuss. Murray plays Bob Wiley, a mentally unstable patient who follows his egotistical psychotherapist, Dr. Leo Marvin (Dreyfuss), on vacation. When Bob befriends the members of Leo's family and they help each other overcome their problems, the patient's continued presence pushes the doctor over the edge. What About Bob? was released by Buena Vista Pictures Distribution on May 17, 1991. The film received positive reviews and grossed $63.7 million in the US.

== Plot ==
In New York City, neurotic and multiphobic Bob Wiley spends his life in a near-constant state of distress. Exasperated by Bob's high-maintenance needs, his therapist closes his practice and refers Bob to the egotistical and controlling Dr. Leo Marvin, who believes his new self-help book, Baby Steps, will make him famous. Leo gives Bob a copy of Baby Steps and makes an appointment to see him following the Marvin family's vacation. Unable to cope without regular reassurance, Bob repeatedly calls Leo's telephone exchange in failed attempts to deduce his location. Bob then visits the exchange while posing as a detective investigating Bob's suicide and learns that the Marvins are at Lake Winnipesaukee, New Hampshire.

Bob travels there by bus, irritating fellow passengers with his habits. He encounters Leo, who agrees to call Bob at a local coffee shop if he then returns home. Out of spite, the shop owners—the Guttmans, whom Leo had outbid for their dream lake house—take Bob to Leo's doorstep. There, Bob meets Leo's wife, Fay, teenage daughter Anna, and young son Siggy, all of whom are charmed by his eccentric personality, to Leo's irritation. Hoping to be rid of him, Leo advises Bob to take a vacation from his problems and return to the city. Bob, having never been on vacation, takes the advice literally and stays at Lake Winnipesaukee.

Bob unintentionally bonds with Leo's family: he faces his fear of sailing after Anna ties him to a boat's mast, inadvertently gives Siggy the confidence to dive into the lake—which Leo had failed to achieve—and overcomes his germophobia. After Leo pushes Bob into the lake, Fay forces him to apologize and invites Bob to dinner. Oblivious to Leo's hostility, Bob accepts as he believes the events are part of Leo's radical therapy. A thunderstorm forces Bob to spend the night. The following morning, the Good Morning America television crew arrive to interview Leo about Baby Steps and, despite Leo's reluctance, features Bob in the interview as an example of the book's success. Leo humiliates himself during the interview by giving stilted and nervous responses while Bob speaks highly of the Marvins and the book, unwittingly stealing the spotlight.

Infuriated, Leo attempts to have Bob institutionalized, but he quickly befriends the hospital staff, who are convinced he is sane. Leo then abandons Bob in a remote location, but Bob hitches a ride back to the lake house while various mishaps delay Leo. A disheveled Leo returns after nightfall, but is happily surprised by a crowd awaiting him for his birthday, including his sister Lily. When Bob appears and puts his arm around Lily, Leo snaps and tackles him. Leo is sedated and his family reluctantly asks Bob to leave due to Leo's seemingly irrational anger towards him.

A manic Leo sneaks out, steals explosives from the general store, straps them to Bob, and abandons him in the woods, dubbing the experience "death therapy". Believing the explosives are a metaphor for his problems, Bob frees himself of his remaining fears. He reunites with the Marvins and praises Leo for curing him. Leo worriedly enquires about the whereabouts of the explosives, which Bob has stored under the lake house. The house explodes, to the observing Guttmans' delight; shocked, Leo is rendered catatonic and institutionalized.

Some time later, Bob marries Lily and, upon their pronouncement as husband and wife, Leo snaps out of his catatonic state and screams, "No!", but the sentiment is lost in the family's excitement at his recovery. A closing text reveals that Bob went back to school and became a psychologist, then wrote a best-selling book titled Death Therapy, for which Leo is suing him for the rights.

== Cast ==
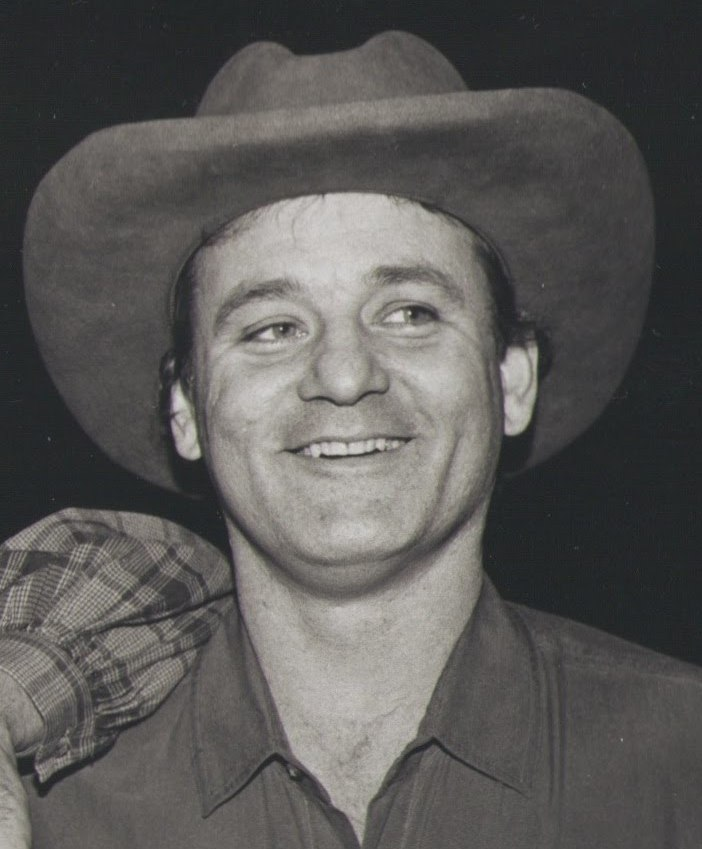
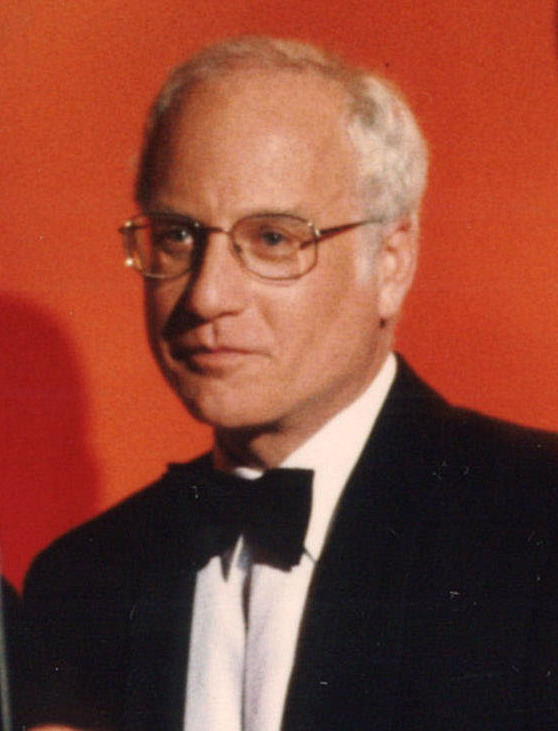
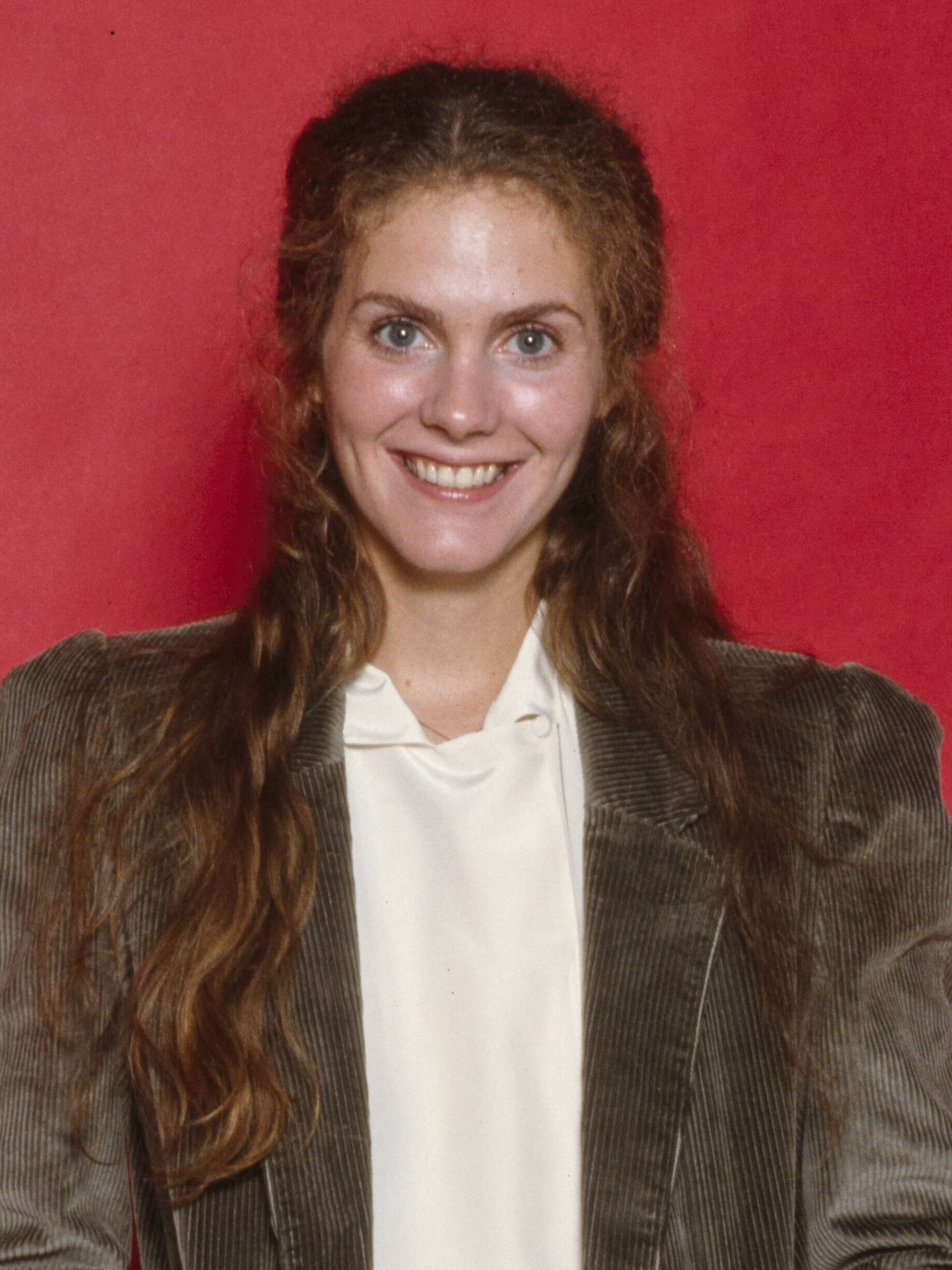
Bill Murray (pictured in 1989), Richard Dreyfuss (1996), and Julie Hagerty (early 1980s)
- Bill Murray as Bob Wiley, a neurotic, phobia-ridden, and overly dependent man
- Richard Dreyfuss as Dr. Leo Marvin, a pompous, uptight psychotherapist
- Julie Hagerty as Fay Marvin, Leo's kind-hearted and supportive wife
- Charlie Korsmo as Sigmund "Siggy" Marvin, Leo and Fay's depressed, introspective son & Anna's younger brother
- Kathryn Erbe as Anna Marvin, Leo and Fay's teenage daughter & Siggy's older sister
- Fran Brill as Lily Marvin, Leo's cheerful sister from Chicago
- Tom Aldredge as Mr. Guttman, an elderly town resident and coffee shop owner who despises Leo
- Susan Willis as Mrs. Guttman, Mr. Guttman's wife
- Roger Bowen as Phil
- Doris Belack as Dr. Catherine Tomsky
- Marcella Lowery as Betty
- Reg E. Cathey as Howie
- Aida Turturro as Prostitute
- Melinda Mullins as Marie Grady
- Joan Lunden as Herself, cohost of Good Morning America

== Production ==
Before Frank Oz was hired to direct, Garry Marshall was considered, and Woody Allen was approached to play Dr. Marvin. Allen was also considered to direct and possibly co-write the script with Tom Schulman. However, because Allen had always generated his own projects rather than getting handed an existing property to make his own, Oz was hired to direct. Allen also declined the role of Dr. Marvin, thus Richard Dreyfuss was ultimately cast. Patrick Stewart was also considered for the role. Early in development, Robin Williams was attached to the project. Other directors considered to helm the film included Milos Forman, Steve Kloves, Arthur Hiller, Danny DeVito and Carl Reiner. Jack Nicholson and Michael Caine were also considered for the role of Dr. Leo Marvin. According to Tom Schulman, Alan Arkin was also considered for Dr. Marvin. According to Oz, Bob Newhart and Richard Benjamin were also considered for Dr. Marvin. Gwyneth Paltrow was considered for the role of Anna Marvin.

=== Filming ===
What About Bob? was filmed in and around the town of Moneta, Virginia, located on Smith Mountain Lake. For the scene in which Bob accidentally blows up the house, producers used a 3/4-sized model replica of the actual house that they detonated on a nearby lot. The scenes of Bob arriving in town on the bus with his goldfish were filmed in downtown Moneta, which was repainted for the movie. The local institute where Leo tries to commit Bob is actually the local Elks National Home for retirees in the nearby town of Bedford, Virginia. Scenes were also shot in New York City. According to Oz, Murray was "really frightened" about filming in the city. Murray said that he improvised a lot in the film.

=== Production difficulties ===
Oz has confirmed in interviews that there was conflict on the set during the making of the film. In addition, both Murray and Dreyfuss have stated in separate interviews that they did not get along with each other during filming:

It's entertaining—everybody knows somebody like that Bob guy. [Richard Dreyfuss and I] didn't get along on the movie particularly, but it worked for the movie. I mean, I drove him nuts, and he encouraged me to drive him nuts.

— Bill Murray, March 19, 1993 interview with Entertainment Weekly

How about it? Funny movie. Terribly unpleasant experience. We didn't get along, me and Bill Murray. But I've got to give it to him: I don't like him, but he makes me laugh even now. I'm also jealous that he's a better golfer than I am. It's a funny movie. No one ever comes up to you and says, "I identify with the patient". They always say, "I have patients like that. I identify with your character". No one ever says that they're willing to identify with the other character.

— Richard Dreyfuss, October 8, 2009 interview with The A.V. Club

Oz also verified that there was a feud between Murray and Dreyfuss:

I was just trying to get the best out of both of them. Richard is a very structured person. And I'm not that structured. And Billy is very unstructured. So you have that opposite going also. And as a matter of fact, I just wrote Richard a letter, after all these years, because I was looking at that movie, and I realized how brilliant Richard's work was. But yes, they didn't get along. And in my perverse directorial intent, I was very pleased [laughs]. They're not supposed to get along. It's not that I was simpatico with Bill, but I leaned more towards the ideas that Bill had. But I am so grateful to Richard for his performance.

— Frank Oz, January 28, 2021 interview with Rolling Stone

In subsequent interviews, Dreyfuss reiterated what he said of his experience working with Murray, notably when he appeared at Fan Expo Canada in 2017. Dreyfuss further alleged in 2019 that at one point during the production, Murray screamed at him while intoxicated, telling him "Everyone hates you! You are tolerated!" and then threw an ashtray at him. When Murray appeared on The Howard Stern Show in 2014, Howard Stern asked him if he intended to irritate Dreyfuss. Murray responded: "I really try to make the other actor look good whenever I can (...) In this particular film, annoying Dreyfuss, which I kind of got to enjoy I gotta confess—but I didn't try to annoy him off the screen." Murray also acknowledged in 2025 that he threw a glass at the ceiling and denied throwing it at Dreyfuss. Although neither of them have crossed paths since the release of the film, Dreyfuss confirmed in a 2020 interview that he has forgiven Murray.

Producer Laura Ziskin recalled having a disagreement with Murray that resulted in his tossing her into a lake. Ziskin confirmed in 2003: "Bill also threatened to throw me across the parking lot and then broke my sunglasses and threw them across the parking lot. I was furious and outraged at the time, but having produced a dozen movies, I can safely say it is not common behavior".

In April 2022, Dreyfuss's son Ben tweeted a recollection about Murray's on-set behavior towards his father and Ziskin: "Bill Murray had a meltdown during [What About Bob?] because he wanted an extra day off and Laura said no and he ripped her glasses off her face and my dad complained about his behavior and Bill Murray threw an ashtray at him." Ben also added, "Everyone walked off the production and flew back to L.A. and it only resumed after Disney hired some bodyguards to physically separate my dad and Bill Murray in between takes."

=== Profits lawsuit ===
In April 2015, Richard Dreyfuss sued the Walt Disney Company over the film's profits. Dreyfuss has claimed that Disney refused to hire his chosen auditor, Robinson and Co. Christine Turner Wagner, widow of Turner & Hooch (1989) producer Raymond Wagner, was also involved with the lawsuit.

== Reception ==
=== Box office ===
What About Bob? was released in the United States and Canada on May 17, 1991. During its opening weekend it grossed a total of $9.2 million from 1,463 theaters—an average of $6,299 per theater—making it the highest grossing film of the weekend, ahead of F/X2 ($3.9 million) and Madonna: Truth or Dare ($3.4 million), both in their second weekend. In its second weekend—taking place over the extended 4-day Memorial Day holiday—What About Bob? fell to the number 2 position with an $11.2 million gross, placing it behind Backdraft ($15.7 million) and ahead of Hudson Hawk ($7.1 million), both films making their debut. What About Bob? fell to the number 3 position in its third weekend with a $6.4 million gross, behind the debut of Soapdish ($6.7 million) and ahead of Thelma & Louise ($4.2 million), in its second weekend.

What About Bob? remained in the top-ten highest-grossing films for seven weeks. In total, What About Bob? grossed $63.7 million compared to its $39 million budget, making it the 15th highest-grossing film of 1991. This also made it Buena Vista's second highest-grossing live action film of the year behind Father of the Bride.

=== Critical response ===
Review aggregation website Rotten Tomatoes gives What About Bob? a 71% approval rating based on reviews from 124 critics. The site's consensus reads: "What About Bob? turns a predictable premise into a sharp, humane comedy thanks to Bill Murray's brilliantly neurotic performance, memorable one-liners, and Frank Oz's affable directorial touch." Metacritic, which uses a weighted average, assigned the film a score of 60 out of 100, based on 17 critics, indicating "mixed or average" reviews.

When the television program Siskel and Ebert reviewed the film, Roger Ebert gave the film a "thumbs up" rating praising the different performances of Bill Murray and Richard Dreyfuss onscreen together as well as most of the film's humor. He said it was Bill Murray's best film since Ghostbusters in 1984. Gene Siskel gave it a "thumbs down" rating and felt Murray gave a very funny and enjoyable performance in the film, but was rather upset by the Dreyfuss character and his angry and arrogant behaviors. He felt it would have been funnier if Dreyfuss had not given such an angry performance in the film and said that Dreyfuss ultimately ruined the film for him. Leonard Maltin said it is "a very funny outing with Murray and Dreyfuss approaching the relationship of the road runner and the coyote". Maltin faulted the film only for its ending, which he found very abrupt and silly. Lou Cedrone from The Baltimore Sun criticized the film: "It is too predictable and deals with a situation that is more irritating than amusing".

Bravo ranked it number 44 on their 2013 list of the "100 Funniest Movies", behind Shampoo and Pee-wee's Big Adventure.

Slant Magazine named Bill Murray's role one of the "15 Famous Movie Psychopaths".

== See also ==
- Captain Ron
