= Welly Yang =

Taiwanese-American actor, singer, writer and producer

- Born: Wellington Yang; February 13, 1973 (age 53); New York City, New York, U.S.
- Other name: Welly Yang
- Education: Columbia University (BA)
- Occupations: Producer; singer; actor; writer

Wellington "Welly" Yang (Chinese: 楊呈偉; pinyin: Yáng Chéngwěi, born February 13, 1973) is a Taiwanese-American producer, actor, singer, and writer.

== Family and childhood ==
Yang was born in New York City, the son of Tzu-Shong Yang (楊次雄) and Maysing Huang Yang (楊黃美幸). His parents emigrated from Taiwan in 1969. His father was a resident physician in UW Health University Hospital in 1967, and afterward President of "North American Taiwanese Medical Association in New York" in 1986. His mother returned to Taipei in 1991 to direct foreign affairs for the Democratic Progressive Party.

Yang grew up in Great Neck, New York, and graduated from the Lawrenceville School in New Jersey in 1990. He then attended Columbia University, graduating in 1994 with honors in political science/international relations.

== Early work ==
In 1993, while a senior at Columbia, Yang was picked to star in the original Broadway production of Miss Saigon, where he went on to play the lead role of Thuy. He left the Miss Saigon company in 1995 to tour Asia in the title role of Aladdin in Cole Porter's Aladdin. That same year, Yang was cast by the American opera director Peter Sellars' to play one of the leading roles in John Adams (composer) world premiere of I Was Looking At the Ceiling and then I Saw the Sky. The opera's world tour included stops at Lincoln Center, Cal Arts in Berkeley, the Edinburgh International Festival, Hamburg's Thalia Theater, the Helsinki Festival, and the Paris Festival. These performances were called "dynamic" by Time Magazine, "passionate" by The New York Times, and "one of the most remarkable moments in recent operatic times" by the Scotland Times. Yang returned to the New York stage in 1998 as Whizzer in NAATCO's non-traditional casting of William Finn's Falsettoland. The production was lauded for its universal appeal and The New York Times added that "it's Mr. Yang as the cocky, athletic Whizzer who delivers the most smashing performance. He's persuasive from start to finish as the boy toy who becomes a man in the arms of Marvin and the hospital bed he's confined to after developing AIDS. His angry anthem You Gotta Die Sometime is equal parts fire and frustration and further confirmation that Mr. Finn's ethnically specific work can in fact be a moving, multicultural experience."

Yang has also appeared in numerous television shows such as Law & Order: Special Victims Unit, As the World Turns, National Geographic Explorer and Ghostwriter. In 2001, Yang also co-hosted the talk show Studio Y on MSG Metro Channels, where he interviewed celebrities that included Tina Fey, Ed McMahon, Leslie Bibb, and many others.

In 2005, Yang premiered the musical concert Finding Home, a show that paralleled the story of his parents to that of him and his then girlfriend Dina Morishita. The show premiered at UCLA's Royce Hall and was presented by TUF. It was at the end of that sold-out concert that Yang surprised Morishita by proposing to her in front of the sold-out audience. Finding Home later went on to play at Taiwan's National Concert Hall and Vancouver's Explorasian Festival in 2006.

== Founding Second Generation ==
In 1997, Yang founded Second Generation, a New York-based theater company dedicated to bringing Asian American stories to the world's stage. Under his artistic leadership, the company cultivated the works of many emerging playwrights, many of whom went on to receive productions throughout the country. The company's In the Works program, helped to launch young playwrights such as Michael Golamco, Lloyd Suh, and Carla Ching.

The company also commissioned Yang along with co-writers Brian Yorkey and Woody Pak to write and develop the musicals Making Tracks and The Wedding Banquet (a musical adaptation of Ang Lee's Academy Award-winning film). Making Tracks first premiered in 1999 at the Taipei Theater in New York then went on to further development at Taiwan's National Theater in 2001, Seattle's Village Theater, in 2002, and San Jose Repertory Theater in 2004. The album was musically directed by Tom Kitt, and featured Lea Salonga, Sharon Leal, Hoon Lee, Deedee Lynn Magno, and Michael K. Lee, among others. The Wedding Banquet received its world premiere with productions in Singapore, Taiwan, and Seattle. in 2003. In this production of The Wedding Banquet, Yang and his team chose Dina Morishita (who had formerly played Eponine in Les Misérables and Kim in Miss Saigon) to play opposite Yang as Wei Wei.

In his work with Second Generation, Yang founded the "Concert of Excellence" to celebrate the achievements of Asian Americans in entertainment. Now presented as the Asian Excellence Awards, the awards show is the only nationally televised event celebrating significant Asian and Asian American achievements in entertainment, the arts and other disciplines that have had a profound impact on American culture.

== Asian Excellence awards ==
In 2003, Yang moved to Los Angeles where he launched the Asian Excellence Awards, that aired on Comcast's AZN Television and E! Network. As the pioneering Asian American awards show, it played a pivotal role in uniting emerging Asian American talent with established Hollywood figures, contributing to the path that paved the way for increased recognition of Asian talent in the industry. Stars and performances included Chow Fun-Fat, Steven Segal, Lucy Liu, Quentin Tarantino, Daniel Dae Kim, Lou Diamond Phillips, Pat Morita, Ralph Macchio, Russell Peters, Cirque du Soleil's Ka, Mike Shinoda, Carrie Ann Inaba, Bobby Lee, Tia Carrere, Kelly Hu, Margaret Cho, Rob Schneider, and B.D. Wong, among many others.

== Other projects ==
Yang also turned his creative passion to architecture and design while in Los Angeles, designing and building several homes that earned recognition as 'Home of the Week' in the prestigious Los Angeles Times.

== Taiwan productions and performances ==
Through the years, Yang returned frequently to his parents homeland of Taiwan to perform as a soloist with various symphonies, including the Taiwan National Symphony, the Taipei City Symphony, and to perform on the popular variety show Chang Fay's Big Brother Entertainment 綜藝大哥大.

In 2020, during the COVID-19 pandemic, he resettled temporarily with his wife and children in Taiwan. It was during this time that he returned back to performing after a long hiatus. With his wife Dina Morishita playing Elsa, they performed in the symphonic version of "Frozen" with the Evergreen Symphony, then in a series of solo concerts entitled "Welly and Dina" at Taiwan's National Concert Hall, Kaoshiung's Weiwuying, and Taichung's National Opera House. In 2022, he began working with Taiwan's Hua Musical to help the company develop Taiwan's musical industry. The company worked with Yang to redevelop the musical Wedding Banquet, after a 20 year hiatus. In the summer of 2023, they mounted a concert version of the revised musical with a local Taiwan ensemble and orchestra, and reuniting the original three principal performers: Yang, Dina Morishita, and Tyley Ross.

== Plays and musicals ==
- Miss Saigon
- Cole Porter's Aladdin
- I Was Looking At the Ceiling and Then I Saw the Sky
- Making Tracks
- The Wedding Banquet
- Finding Home

== Filmography ==
- Law & Order: Special Victims Unit
- Ghostwriter
- The Cut Runs Deep
- Studio Y
- Popcorn Shrimp
- Asian Excellence Awards

== See also ==
- Peter Sellars
- Taiwanese American
- John Adams
