= Making Tracks =

- Music: Woody Pak
- Lyrics: Brian Yorkey
- Book: Welly Yang
- Productions: 1999 Off-Broadway; 2000 Washington

Making Tracks is an Asian American musical theater production by Second Generation, a New York-based theater company, with music by Woody Pak, lyrics by Brian Yorkey, and concept and book by Welly Yang.

Making Tracks tells the story of the rich and diverse history of Asians in America. Asians were (and still are) often limited to playing the roles of "the gook," "the geek," and "the gangster."

In the summer of 1993, Welly Yang began searching through history books and reading stories of Asian Americans. In 1998, Yang asked two friends, Woody Pak, a recent Juilliard graduate whom he met through a mutual friend, and Brian Yorkey, a classmate from Columbia University, to collaborate on a rock musical to tell these stories.

The original show was produced Off-Broadway in cooperation with the Taipei Theater in New York City in February 1999, bringing on another Columbia classmate, Lenny Leibowitz, as director. It also had Shawn Ku as choreographer and it was musically directed by David Jenkins and Tom Kitt. Yorkey and Kitt would go on later to write the Tony award-winning show Next To Normal. The show employed a cast of Asian American theater professionals, many who had performed with Yang from Miss Saigon. It starred Hoon Lee, Cindy Cheung, Timothy Huang, Mel Duane Gionson, Thomas Kouo, Mimosa, Michael Minn, Kiki Moritsugu, Aiko Nakasone, Rodney To, Virginia Wing, and Yang. Sets were by Sarah Lambert; projection design by Elaine McCarthy; graphic design by Richard Ng; lighting by Stephen Petrilli; costumes by Rasheda Poole and Shawn Ku; sound by Virg Nafarette.

Village Theatre invited the show to Washington state to continue developing the show as part of the Village Originals program in the spring of 2000. That production added a new second act. After that successful production, the Taipei Philharmonic Foundation invited them to Taiwan, and launched the show's concept album, in collaboration with Sony Music Taiwan.

== Musical numbers ==
From the 2002 Seattle production:

Act One

Prologue: A Cemetery, San Francisco, California 2001

- Making Tracks (Grandfather )

Scene 1: The Sierra Nevada Mountains, Near Cape Horn, 1865

- Making Tracks (Wei, Dai Lum, Railroad Workers)
- Many Rivers (Dai Lum, Wen)
- This is Our Day (Dai Lum, Wei, Railroad Workers)
- Making Tracks (Reprise) (Wei, Dai Lum, Railroad Workers)

Scene 2: Angel Island, San Francisco Bay, 1885

- Mei Guo (Lucky, Immigrants)
- Mei Guo (Reprise) (Older Immigrant, Lucky, Immigrants)
- Many Rivers (Reprise) (Lucky, Translator)
- Mei Guo (Reprise) (Lucky, Wei)

Scene 3: Osaka, Japan and San Francisco, California, 1918-1941

- Picture Perfect (Miyuki, Brides)
- So Now I See You (Miyuki, Tokashi)

Scene 4: San Francisco, 1941

- Step On In (Charlie Chuck, Forbidden City Performers)
- Dance the World Away (Frankie, Dottie)
- Dance the World Away (Dottie)

Scene 5: Heart Mountain, Wyoming, 1942-1944

- Shikataganai (Tokashi, Paul, Miyuki, Frankie, Internees)
- Stars (Paul, Miyuki, Soldiers)

Scene 6: Heart Mountain, Wyoming and San Francisco, California, 1944

- The Lucky One (Paul, Grandfather)

Act Two
Prologue: A Club, The Bowery, New York City, 2001
- I Will Walk Away (Dylan)

Scene 1: A Townhouse, Pacific Heights, San Francisco Scene 2: An Office, Mission District

- The Way a Day Goes By (Meg, T.J., Grace, Minister, Mourners)

Scene 3: A Cemetery, Daly City, in the Hills South of San Francisco

- Look Inside (Grandfather, David)
- I'm Not the One (Dylan)

Scene 4: A Hospital, Potrero Hill

- Mei Guo (Reprise)/I'm Not the One (Reprise) (Dylan, David)

Scene 5: An Office, Mission District

- Right Behind Your Eyes (Grace, Dylan)

Scene 6: An Office, Chinatown Scene 7: A Townhouse, Pacific Heights

- Stars (Reprise) (Dylan)

Scene 8: A Nightclub, Near Union Square

- Must be the Music (Club singer, Ensemble)

Scene 9: A Townhouse, Pacific Heights

- Go to Her (Grandfather, David, Dylan)

Scene 10: An Abandoned Nightclub, Sutter Street

- Dance the World Away (Reprise) (Dylan)
- Time and Again (Dylan, Grace)

Scene 11: A Sweatshop, Chinatown

- This is Our Day (Reprise) (Grandfather, Dylan, Meg, Ensemble)

Scene 12: A Hospital, Potrero Hill

- So Now I See You (Reprise) (T.J., Meg)

Scene 13: A Cemetery, Daly City, in the Hills South of San Francisco

- Wings Like a Dove (Meg, Ensemble)
- Making Tracks (Reprise) (Dylan, Grandfather, Ensemble)

== CD ==
=== Tracks (2001) ===
- Making Tracks
- Many Rivers
- This Is Our Day
- Picture Perfect
- So Now I See You
- Mei Guo
- Dance The World Away
- Shikataganai
- Stars
- The Lucky One
- I Will Walk Away
- Satellite
- Must Be The Music
- Wings Like A Dove

=== Cast ===
The cast included Hoon Lee, Welly Yang, Brandon Kuwada, Doan Mackenzie, Alex Lee Tano, Michael K. Lee, Lea Salonga, Rona Figueroa, Cindy Cheung, Julie Danao, Joan Almedilla, and Sharon Leal. Gloria Lee Pak is credited with background vocals.
