= Remember WENN =

Television series

- Genre: Comedy drama
- Developed by: Rupert Holmes
- Starring: Tom Beckett; Carolee Carmello; George Hall; Margaret Hall; John Bedford Lloyd; Melinda Mullins; Christopher Murney; Amanda Naughton; Hugh O'Gorman; Kevin O'Rourke; Dina Spybey; Mary Stout
- Composer: Rupert Holmes
- Country of origin: United States
- Original language: English
- No. of seasons: 4
- No. of episodes: 57

Production
- Executive producer: Paula Connelly Skorka
- Producers: Frank Doelger; Howard Meltzer
- Cinematography: David Sperling
- Production companies: Entertainment Group; Turtleback Productions

Original release
- Network: American Movie Classics
- Release: January 13, 1996 – September 11, 1998

Remember WENN is a comedy-drama television series that aired from 1996 to 1998 on the cable channel American Movie Classics, as the network's first scripted original series. Created and written by Rupert Holmes (with music also by Holmes) and set at the fictional Pittsburgh radio station WENN in the late 1930s and early 1940s, it depicted events (both dramatic and comic) in the personal and professional lives of the station's staff in the era before and during World War II and the Golden Age of Radio. It is not related to the real radio station in Alabama which used the WENN callsign from 1959 to 1983 and again since 2009. The series title is a play on the phrase "remember when".

The show ran for four seasons totalling 56 episodes, including an hour-long Christmas episode. The series was slated for a fifth season, but was cancelled when new management took over AMC. Holmes says that it was his favorite writing experience of his career. After decades of being unavailable to audiences, all four seasons of the series are currently streaming on AMC+ and PLEX TV.

== Major characters ==
- Elizabeth "Betty" Roberts (Amanda Naughton) – Originally an unpaid writing intern at WENN, the plucky and determined Betty is hired as a salaried writer after resolving a crisis at the station in the first episode. Being from Elkhart, Indiana, early on Betty exhibits a lot of small-town naivete and at times seems overwhelmed by living in a bigger city like Pittsburgh, though she never loses her spirit. While she primarily remains a writer during the course of the show, she also acts, sings, announces, reads advertisements on the air, negotiates with sponsors, and acts as the de facto station manager on many occasions. Throughout the series, Betty shares romantic and reciprocated feelings for both Victor Comstock and Scott Sherwood. Her relationship with Scott sours when he admits to lying about his background. Her relationship with Victor is unconventional. While Betty shows romantic interest in him, he is usually distant and business-like toward her and appears oblivious to her veiled advances.
- Victor Comstock (John Bedford Lloyd) – The station manager of WENN during most of the first season of the series, Victor Comstock clearly loves working in radio and inspires loyalty amongst his staff. Though generally honest and upright, he is not above reluctantly engaging in mild deception or slightly shady ploys to keep the always-financially-shaky station running. Victor leaves WENN to broadcast for the BBC in London, and is reported to have been killed during a bombing raid. Victor revisits WENN at the end of season two, only revealing himself to Betty. He discloses that he survived the bombing and is now working for the American government as a double agent, pretending to be Nazi propagandist "Jonathan Arnold". Betty is sworn to secrecy, even about the fact Victor is alive. Victor returns as the station manager in season four but is revealed to be suffering from post traumatic stress and has no memory of the time since the bombing. He sees Betty outside of the office but does not appear to be as invested in the relationship as she is.
- Scott Sherwood (Kevin O'Rourke) – Introduced towards the end of the first season as Victor Comstock's chosen successor as station manager. Unlike Victor, Scott has no compunction about engaging in audience pandering, or cheerfully lying to sponsors and staff. His catchphrases are an upbeat "Well, I don't know much about radio..." (to which most of the staff replies with firm agreement), and "Would you look at the time?" (often said as he leaves the room whenever there's a unpleasant task to be done, leaving behind someone else to do it.) He does have a well-hidden good side, such as when he swears Gertie and Mr. Foley to secrecy that he helped save Betty's job. In the third season, it is revealed that Scott bluffed his way into his position and is fired. Betty re-hires Scott as an actor for the station. Though Scott was very incompetent as a station manager, he does very well as an on-air performer, even getting nominated for a Golden Lobe award. In addition, Scott shows a knack for cracking secret codes which are suspected of being sent out over the airwaves by WENN sponsors. He makes several romantic advances toward Betty but usually gets rejected. He realizes that Betty is smitten with Victor and often eavesdrops or snoops around to try and gain an advantage in his pursuit of her.
- Jeff Singer (Hugh O'Gorman) – An actor at the station who plays the romantic lead on most of the station's programs. Jeff travels to London to participate in Victor's broadcasts, but returns to WENN after the air raid, having sustained minor injuries. He has a complicated romantic relationship with Hilary Booth throughout the series. They originally married several years before the first season but divorced a short time later in Mexico without telling anyone. They decided to remarry in season two secretly since everyone believed they were still married. In the third season, Jeff goes to London and marries Pavla Nemkova, re-divorcing Hilary in the process. The character is absent for much of season three, but later returns and reveals that he only married Pavla so that he can use her to relay confidential information back to the US from war-torn London. However, it turns out that Pavla just used him to move to the US and break into the entertainment industry. Even after Hilary learns the truth, she still shuns him until his divorce is finalized. His divorce from Pavla gets finalized on the last episode.
- Hilary Booth (Melinda Mullins) – An actress at WENN who plays the female lead on most of the station's programs. A former Broadway star, Hilary makes several attempts to return to the stage. Hilary often exhibits diva-like behavior at the station, and is invariably dressed in ultra-chic outfits, always topped by one of her seemingly endless array of dazzling hats. She acts as if she is bigger than the radio programs themselves, often incorporating her real life drama into the on-air scenes instead of reading from Betty's scripts. She is extremely possessive of her on-and-off again husband Jeffrey Singer, and will often put a stop to even the slightest of his interactions with other women. However, it's shown that Hilary cares deeply for Jeff—and that despite her catty and cutting remarks about virtually everyone at WENN, she cares for the radio station staff as well.
- McKinley "Mackie" Bloom (Christopher Murney) – The "Man of a Thousand Voices" who plays many of the character roles on WENN's programs—everything from comic sidekicks to mellifluously-voiced romantic leading men. Short, balding and husky in real life, Mackie can be very self-conscious about the fact that his appearance doesn't match up with his voice. In the third season, it was learned that Mackie served time for unknowingly driving a getaway car in a robbery. In the fourth season, he tours with an off-Broadway production and is absent from many of the episodes.
- Celia Mellon (Dina Spybey) – An ambitious young actress (who claims ties to Pittsburgh's prominent Mellon family), Celia works at WENN during the series' first season. While maintaining a fresh-faced, (mostly) innocent demeanor, she is not averse to sleeping her way to the top, and leaves the station to pursue a career as a film actress in Hollywood. She is seen briefly on a Hollywood set filming a picture in a single season 2 episode. It is mentioned in season 3 that her Hollywood career has continued successfully, while being implied that she is still sleeping with producers to get that success.
- Maple LaMarsh (Carolee Carmello) – An actress and fill-in organist for WENN. A brassy, cheery former burlesque dancer, Maple is initially hired by Betty in the second season of the series. Scott seems to be familiar with Maple's previous career—as WENN began looking for a fill-in organist, it was Scott who suggested Gertie call Maple backstage at the theater, and he knew that backstage phone number by heart. Maple essentially replaces Celia as a regular character and actress on various WENN shows, and is also seen as the station's organist during Eugenia's absence through most of season 2.
- Tom Eldridge (George Hall) – A retired Broadway doorman who does general chores for WENN and fills in occasionally as an actor for the station. Mr. Eldridge is very absent-minded and often misinterprets puns and other forms of wordplay. In the fourth season, he buys a winning lottery ticket. He pretends to lose the ticket but it is later revealed that he used the proceeds of the ticket to keep the radio station afloat.
- Gertrude "Gertie" Reese (Margaret Hall) – The station's competent, but frequently gossipy switchboard operator and receptionist. Gertie writes two scripts that serve as "fantasy" plots for two separate episodes of the series.
- Eugenia Bremer (Mary Stout) – The station's organist who also briefly serves as the host of a short-lived nighttime program. She is absent for most of season two, though her image is still seen in the opening credits. Eugenia begins to develop a romantic relationship with Mr. Foley late in the series.
- Mr. Foley (Tom Beckett) – WENN's Foley artist. Mr. Foley has no on-screen dialogue throughout the series, though his off-screen speech is often noted by other characters to a generally comedic effect. (And he is invariably interrupted and inadvertently cut off on those occasions where he does try to speak.) In the second season, Mr. Foley is revealed to have a brother, who is very loud and crude.

=== Recurring characters ===
- C.J. McHugh (C.J. Byrnes), seasons 1-3 – WENN's beleaguered but usually unflappable sound engineer for the first three seasons of the series.
- Rollie Pruitt (Jonathan Freeman), seasons 2-4 – A representative from Globe Enterprises, the owners of WENN. The portly, sneering, and roundly disliked Rollie is usually scheming to severely trim costs—if not shut the unprofitable station down completely. Serves as station manager for much of season 3 after Scott's removal from the position.
- Gus Kahana (Jeff Bergman), seasons 2 and 4 – A truck driver working for free as a WENN on-air intern, in hopes of starting an acting career. Gus is especially notable for his wide range of celebrity impressions.
- Enid Fairleigh (Melissa Dye), seasons 2 and 4 – Intensely perky, Enid is another ambitious "acting intern" who occasionally performs on-air. Enid also has writing ambitions.
- Lester (David Pursely), season 4 – WENN's sound engineer during season four (though mentioned as a second station engineer in previous episodes). Lester is an older gentleman with an eye for the ladies.

== Episodes ==
=== Season 1 (1996) ===
No. overall	No. in season	Title	Directed by	Written by	Original release date
1	1	"On the Air"	Juan José Campanella	Rupert Holmes	January 13, 1996
2	2	"Klondike 9366"	Juan José Campanella	Rupert Holmes	January 13, 1996
3	3	"A Rock and a Soft Place"	Howard Meltzer	Rupert Holmes	February 7, 1996
4	4	"There But for the Grace"	Juan José Campanella	Rupert Holmes	February 21, 1996
5	5	"Sight Unseen"	Juan José Campanella	Rupert Holmes	June 1, 1996
6	6	"Emperor Smith"	Frank Doelger	Rupert Holmes	June 8, 1996
7	7	"Who's Minding the Asylum?"	Howard Meltzer	Story by : Rupert Holmes; Teleplay by : Rupert Holmes & G. Ross Parker	June 15, 1996
8	8	"Armchair Detective"	Juan José Campanella	Rupert Holmes	June 22, 1996
9	9	"Hilary Booth, Registered Nurse"	Howard Meltzer	Rupert Holmes	June 29, 1996
10	10	"Valentino Speaks!"	Juan José Campanella	Story by : Rupert Holmes; Teleplay by : G. Ross Parker	July 13, 1996
11	11	"A Capital Idea"	Frank Doelger	Rupert Holmes	July 20, 1996
12	12	"Popping the Question"	Howard Meltzer	Rupert Holmes	August 3, 1996
13	13	"World of Tomorrow"	Juan José Campanella	Rupert Holmes	August 17, 1996

=== Season 2 (1996–97) ===
No. overall	No. in season	Title	Directed by	Written by	Original release date
14	1	"Radio Silence"	Howard Meltzer	Rupert Holmes	November 16, 1996
15	2	"I Now Pronounce You Man and Wife Again"	Richard Shepard	Rupert Holmes	November 23, 1996
16	3	"Some Good News, Some Bad News"	Bruce Leddy	Rupert Holmes	November 30, 1996
17	4	"Don't Act Like That"	Howard Meltzer	Rupert Holmes	December 7, 1996
18	5	"The Diva That Wouldn't Die"	Richard Shepard	Story by : Rupert Holmes; Teleplay by : Rick Mitz	December 14, 1996
19	6	"Christmas in the Airwaves"	Peter Lauer	Rupert Holmes	December 21, 1996
20	7	"Christmas in the Airwaves"	Peter Lauer	Rupert Holmes	December 21, 1996
21	8	"Behind Every Great Woman"	Danny Leiner	Story by : Rupert Holmes; Teleplay by : Rupert Holmes & Rick Mitz	December 28, 1996
22	9	"Strange Bedfellows"	Chris Koch	Rupert Holmes	January 4, 1997
23	10	"Close Quarters"	Peter Lauer	Rupert Holmes	January 11, 1997
24	11	"Scott Sherwood of the F.B.I."	Richard Shepard	Rupert Holmes	January 18, 1997
25	12	"The First Mrs. Bloom"	Julian Petrillo	Rupert Holmes	January 25, 1997
26	13	"Like a Brother"	Howard Meltzer	Rupert Holmes	February 1, 1997
27	14	"Magic"	Richard Shepard	Rupert Holmes	February 8, 1997

=== Season 3 (1997) ===
No. overall	No. in season	Title	Directed by	Written by	Original release date
28	1	"In the WENN Small Hours"	Howard Meltzer	Rupert Holmes	August 16, 1997
29	2	"Prior to Broadway"	Richard Shepard	Story by : Emily Whitesell & Rupert Holmes; Teleplay by : Rupert Holmes	August 23, 1997
30	3	"Who's Scott Sherwood?"	Juan José Campanella	Rupert Holmes	August 30, 1997
31	4	"The New Actor"	Joanna Kerns	Rupert Holmes	September 6, 1997
32	5	"Two for the Price of One"	Juan José Campanella	Rupert Holmes	September 13, 1997
33	6	"The Importance of Being Betty"	Michael Tuchner	Rupert Holmes & Leon Seidman	September 20, 1997
34	7	"Mr. & Mrs. Singer"	Richard Shepard	Rupert Holmes	September 27, 1997
35	8	"Nothing Up My Sleeve"	Jason Alexander	Rupert Holmes	October 11, 1997
36	9	"A Star in Stripes Forever"	Jill Mitwell	Rupert Holmes	October 18, 1997
37	10	"A Girl Like Maple"	Richard Shepard	Rupert Holmes	October 25, 1997
38	11	"From the Pen of Gertrude Reece"	Howard Meltzer	Rupert Holmes	November 1, 1997
39	12	"Eugenia Breimer, Master Spy"	Julian Petrillo	Rupert Holmes	November 8, 1997
40	13	"Courting Disaster"	Richard Shepard	Rupert Holmes	November 15, 1997
41	14	"And How"	Julian Petrillo	Rupert Holmes	November 22, 1997
42	15	"The Ghost of WENN"	Jill Mitwell	Rupert Holmes	December 6, 1997
43	16	"Caller I.D."	Richard Shepard	Rupert Holmes	December 13, 1997
44	17	"Happy Homecomings"	Juan José Campanella	Rupert Holmes	December 27, 1997

=== Season 4 (1998) ===
No. overall	No. in season	Title	Directed by	Written by	Original release date
45	1	"Some Time, Some Station"	Juan José Campanella	Rupert Holmes	June 19, 1998
46	2	"Thanks a Lottery!"	Howard Meltzer	Rupert Holmes	June 26, 1998
47	3	"You've Met Your Match"	Richard Shepard	Rupert Holmes	July 3, 1998
48	4	"And If I Die Before I Sleep"	Juan José Campanella	Rupert Holmes	July 10, 1998
49	5	"Hillary's Agent"	Richard Shepard	Rupert Holmes	July 17, 1998
50	6	"Birth of a Station"	Juan José Campanella	Rupert Holmes	July 24, 1998
51	7	"Follies of WENN"	Richard Shepard	Rupert Holmes	July 31, 1998
52	8	"Pitfall"	Joanna Kerns	Rupert Holmes	August 7, 1998
53	9	"Work Shift"	Juan José Campanella	Rupert Holmes	August 14, 1998
54	10	"Past Tense, Future Imperfect"	Danny Leiner	Rupert Holmes	August 21, 1998
55	11	"The Sunset Also Rises"	Juan José Campanella	David Ives	August 28, 1998
56	12	"At Cross Purposes"	Howard Meltzer	Rupert Holmes	September 4, 1998
57	13	"All's Noisy on the Pittsburgh Front"	Juan José Campanella	Rupert Holmes	September 11, 1998

== Notable guest stars ==
- Jason Alexander
- Philip Bosco
- Eddie Bracken
- Betty Buckley
- David Canary
- Peggy Cass
- Daniel Davis
- Bob Dorian
- Boyd Gaines
- Peter Gerety
- Greg Germann
- Malcolm Gets
- Joe Grifasi
- Julie Hagerty
- Harry Hamlin
- Simon Jones
- Patti LuPone
- Peter Maloney
- Rue McClanahan
- Roddy McDowall
- Russell Means
- Jan Miner
- Donna Murphy
- Peter Noone
- John Ratzenberger
- Dan Resin
- Molly Ringwald
- Howard Rollins
- Mickey Rooney
- Marian Seldes
- J.K. Simmons
- Mary Louise Wilson
- Irene Worth
- Louis Zorich
