= Ghostwriter (book series) =

Children's book series

One of the Ghostwriter books

As with many television shows, Ghostwriter (4 October 1992 to 13 February 1995) also produced several book stories that never made it to air. This article lists all books based on the show.

- The Ghostwriter Detective Guide, October 1, 1992, by Susan Lurie
- A Match of Wills, October 1, 1992, by Eric Weiner
- Courting Danger and Other Stories, November 1992, by Dina Anastasio
- Dress Code Mess, October 1, 1992, by Sarah St. Antoine
- The Mini Book of Kids' Puzzles
- The Big Book of Kids' Puzzles
- Off the Top of Your Head: Trivia, Facts, and Fun
- Steer Clear of Haunted Hill
- The Team: On and Off the Set
- Amazement Park Adventure
- Alias Diamond Jones
- Doubletalk: Codes, Signs, and Symbols
- Rally! A Year's Supply of Fun
- Blackout!
- A Blast With the Past
- Digging For Clues
- Disappearing Act
- Word Up!
- Write Now! A Postcard Book
- The Book Chase
- Go Figure: Puzzles, Games, and Funny Figures of Speech
- Clinton Street Crime Wave
- Read This Rebus!
- Ghost Story
- What's the Score? A Sports Puzzle Book
- The Big Stink and Five Other Mysteries
- Laugh Rally! A Ghostwriter Joke Book
- The Chocolate Bar Bust
- School's Out! Puzzles That Take You Cool Places
- Daycamp Nightmare: Camp at Your Own Risk #1
- Disaster On Wheels: Camp at Your Own Risk #2
- Creepy Sleepaway: Camp at Your Own Risk #3
- Night of the Living Cavemen
- The Haunted House of Puzzles
- A Crime of Two Cities
- Movie Marvels: Film Facts You'll Flip For
- Just in Time
- The Ghostwriter Detective Guide 2
- Deadline
- Cow-Eating Fish and Other Amazing Animals
- Attack of the Slime Monster
- The Man Who Vanished
- Alien Alert
- Caught in the Net
- Hector's Haunted House
