= Brian Yorkey =

American playwright

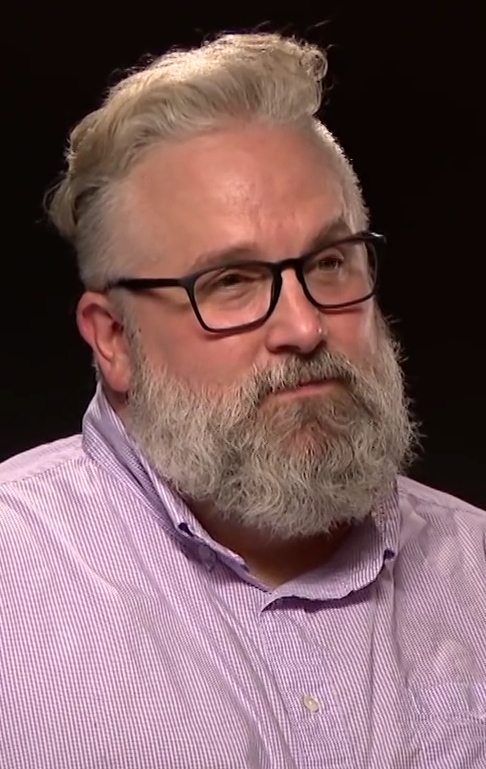
- Yorkey in 2018
- Born: Omaha, Nebraska, U.S.
- Education: Columbia University (BA)
- Known for: Next to Normal, 13 Reasons Why
- Awards: Pulitzer Prize for Drama (2010); Tony Award for Best Original Score (2009)

Brian Yorkey is an American playwright and lyricist. His works often explore dark and controversial subject matter such as mental illness, grief, the underbelly of suburbia, and ethics in both psychiatry and public education.

== Early life ==
Yorkey was born in Omaha, Nebraska, where he was raised, before his family moved to Issaquah, Washington. He graduated from Columbia University in 1993, where he served as the Artistic Director of the Varsity Show. He is an alumnus of the BMI Lehman Engel Musical Theater Workshop.

== Career ==
=== Early work ===
Prior to bringing Next to Normal to Broadway, Yorkey was affiliated with Village Theatre in Issaquah, where he began as a KIDSTAGE student and eventually progressed to a seven-year tenure as Associate Artistic Director. Four musicals written by Yorkey—Funny Pages (1993), Making Tracks (2002), The Wedding Banquet (2003), and Play it by Heart (2005)—were staged there.

While at Village Theatre, Yorkey founded the KIDSTAGE Company class which teaches teens to write, direct, and perform their own musicals. Yorkey's frequent collaborator, Tom Kitt, joined him in assisting with the score to the 2008 Company Original, In Your Eyes. He worked with composer Tim Symons, on other Company Originals such as Last Exit and A Perfect Fall.

During Yorkey's tenure as Village Theatre's Associate Artistic Director, he developed a comprehensive new works program, Village Originals. The Village Originals program develops approximately ten new musicals each season, in various stages from reading to full production. Yorkey is credited with the development of over 50 new musicals, including the 2010 Broadway musical, Million Dollar Quartet, which was nominated for Best Musical, Best Book of a Musical, and won Best Performance by a Featured Actor (Levi Kreis) in a Musical at the 64th Tony Awards.

== Next to Normal and subsequent work ==
Next to Normal began as a ten-minute-long piece called Feeling Electric, which recent college graduates Yorkey and Kitt wrote as a final project for the BMI Musical Theatre Workshop at the end of the 1990s.

Their inspiration was a segment about electroconvulsive therapy Yorkey saw on Dateline NBC.

Next to Normal was nominated for a total of eleven Tony Awards, including the Tony Award for Best Book of a Musical. The show won the 2009 Tony Award for Best Original Score, and Tony Award for Best Orchestrations. In 2010 Yorkey and Kitt were awarded the Pulitzer Prize for Drama for Next to Normal, citing "a powerful rock musical that grapples with mental illness in a suburban family and expands the scope of subject matter for musicals."

In 2013, Yorkey's musical with Kitt, If/Then, starring Idina Menzel, LaChanze, and Anthony Rapp, had its pre-Broadway try-out at The National Theatre in Washington, D.C. The musical subsequently opened on Broadway on March 30, 2014. The musical garnered a Tony Award nomination and Outer Critics Circle nomination for Best Original Score for Kitt and Yorkey, as well as a nomination for Best Performance by a Leading Actress for Menzel.

In 2014, Yorkey's collaborative work, with Sting and co-librettist John Logan, The Last Ship opened on Broadway. The musical is loosely based on Sting's album The Soul Cages (1990). It opened on September 29, 2014. Yorkey and Logan were nominated for an Outer Critics Circle Award for their book.

He co-wrote the book and lyrics, with Melanie Burgess, to Jesus in My Bedroom, an original musical, with a score by Tim Symons. Jesus in My Bedroom received a reading at Village Theatre's 13th Annual Festival of New Musicals.

He wrote the music, with Kitt, for a musical version of Freaky Friday with librettist Bridget Carpenter. Freaky Friday is produced by Disney Theatrical Productions, and had its World Premiere at the Signature Theatre (Arlington, Virginia) in October 2016. The musical began performances at the La Jolla Playhouse, San Diego, on January 31, 2017 running to March 12. The cast features Emma Hunton and Heidi Blickenstaff.

=== Film and television ===
Yorkey adapted Jay Asher's bestselling novel, 13 Reasons Why, for Netflix, Paramount Television and Anonymous Content. Spanning four seasons, the series ran from March 2017 to June 2020. While the first season earned positive reviews, the rest were poorly received.

He scripted Sluts for Lionsgate Films. His first feature film pitch, Time After Time, sold in a bidding war to Universal Pictures. It is now fast tracked at Lionsgate/Summit with Bradley Buecker directing. Yorkey is adapting Next to Normal's film adaptation for Anonymous Content and an untitled fashion musical for Paramount Pictures, Walter Parkes and Laurie MacDonald. Yorkey and Kitt are also developing Score!, a theatre camp musical for Robert Downey Jr. to star in for Warner Bros.

More recently, he signed deals with Netflix to start the Echoes limited series, and adapt Neal Shusterman's book Game Changer into a series.

=== Future theatrical projects ===
Yorkey was working with Tom Kitt on a musical adaption of Magic Mike, with Roberto Aguirre-Sacasa writing the book. According to various news sources, on May 2 and 3, 2019, the creative team of Kitt, Yorkey and Aguirre-Sacasa have left the project and a private workshop that had been scheduled for the week of May 3 has been cancelled.
