= Marcella Lowery =

American actress

- Occupation: Actress
- Years active: 1972–present

Marcella Lowery is an American actress. She is known for her roles as Geoffrey Owens' mother, Francine Tibideaux, on The Cosby Show, Jamal Jenkins' grandmother on Ghostwriter from 1992 to 1995, Anna Eldridge in the 1996 film, The Preacher's Wife and as Principal Karen Noble on the NBC sitcom City Guys.

== Early years ==
Lowery graduated from Malverne High School, where she was captain of the varsity girls' basketball team. She saved money that she earned as a babysitter and used it to attend Broadway plays, telling her parents that she was going to basketball practice.

== Career ==
Lowery had a recurring role on The Cosby Show as Francine Tibideaux, the mother of Elvin Tibideaux and mother-in-law of Sondra Huxtable, as well as a brief role in What About Bob?. She was also in The Preacher's Wife and guest-starred in four episodes of Law & Order.

Lowery's work in commercials includes portraying Donovan McNabb's mother in Campbell's Chunky Soup commercials. Lowery has also appeared on the commercials for Colonial Penn.

She also played Maybelle in the Off-Broadway premiere of Before It Hits Home.

Lowery's Broadway credits include portraying Sis Laura in The Member of the Wedding (1975) and Louise in Lolita (1981).

== Personal life ==
Lowery has a daughter.

== Filmography ==
=== Film ===
Year	Title	Role
1981	Arthur	Harriet
1983	Without a Trace	Sgt. Rocco
1989	Lean on Me	Mrs. Richards
1989	Fletch Lives	Selma
1991	New Jack City	Woman in Hallway
1991	What About Bob?	Betty
1996	Vibrations	Nurse
1996	The Preacher's Wife	Anna Eldridge
1996	Rescuing Desire	Jane
2004	Second Best	Nurse
2005	12 and Holding	Nurse
2006	Waltzing Anna	Nurse Hardaway
2006	School for Scoundrels	Mrs. Washington
2008	Uncertainty	Duty Officer #1
2016	Wiener-Dog	Yvette
2018	Can You Ever Forgive Me?	Party Guest
2021	Thunder Force	Grandma Norma

=== Television ===
Year	Title	Role	Notes
1975	How to Succeed in Business Without Really Trying	Smitty	Television film
1979	3 by Cheever	Ruby	Episode: "The Sorrows of Gin"
1988	Monsters	Mom	Episode: "My Zombie Lover"
1988–1989	The Cosby Show	Francine Tibideaux	4 episodes
1989	A Man Called Hawk	Prof. Lowery	Episode: "Life After Death"
1991–2003	Law & Order	Various	4 episodes
1992–1995	Ghostwriter	CeCe Jenkins	Main role
1993	Strapped	Customer	Television film
1994	ABC Afterschool Special	Ms. Rose	Episode: "Just Chill"
1995	New York Undercover	Postal worker	Episode: "Mama Said Knock You Out"
1995	The Cosby Mysteries	Miss Crilley	Episode: "Big Brother Is Watching"
1995	Guiding Light	Judge Gordon	Episode dated August 18, 1995
1997–2001	City Guys	Principal Karen Noble	Main role
2007	Gossip Girl	Nurse	Episode: "Dare Devil"
2008	Life on Mars	Nurse Winnie Ellwood	Episode: "Tuesday's Dead"
2009	The Unusuals	Sheila Trunk	2 episodes
2009	Sherri	Church Lady	Episode: "There's No "I" in Church"
2010	The Good Wife	Nurse	Episode: "Painkiller"
2010	30 Rock	Postal Employee	Episode: "Don Geiss, America and Hope"
2010	Gravity	Selma Jones	Episode: "Namaste MF"
2010	Running Wilde	Carol	Episode: "Oil & Water"
2010	Law & Order: Special Victims Unit	Margaret Holmes	Episode: "Branded"
2011	Suits	Dr. Shrager	Episode: "Pilot"
2012	Blue Bloods	Mrs. Greer	Episode: "Family Business"
2013	The Carrie Diaries	DMV Employee	Episode: "Dangerous Territory"
2014	Girls	Lise	Episode: "Dead Inside"
2015	The Jim Gaffigan Show	Receptionist	Episode: "Pilot"
2016	Royal Pains	Dee	Episode: "Home Sick"
2017	Elementary	Diner	Episode: "Over a Barrel"
2017	The Detour	Elderly woman	Episode: "The City"
2017	Broad City	Betty	Episode: "Witches"
2019	Mindhunter	Lakewood Woman	Episode: "2.6"
2019	First Wives Club	Odessa	2 episodes

== Stage ==
Theatre credits
Year	Title	Role	Venue	Refs.
1972	Jamimma	Jameena	New Federal Theater, Off-Broadway	
1973	Miracle Play	Beatie Roscoe	Playhouse II Theater, Off-Broadway	
1974	The Member of the Wedding	Sis Laura	Helen Hayes Theatre, Broadway	
1975	Welcome to Black River	Lou Mae	St. Mark's Playhouse, Off-Broadway	
1981	Lolita	Louise	Brooks Atkinson Theater, Broadway	
1982	Baseball Wives	Janelle	American Renaissance Theater, Off-Off-Broadway	
1982	Baseball Wives	Janelle	Harold Clurman Theater, Off-Broadway	
1989	Ladies	Allegro	Theatre at St. Clements, Off-Broadway	
1990	Sugar Hill	Blanca Stromburg-Carlson	Theater at St. Peter's Church, New York	
1992	Before It Hits Home	Maybelle	The Public Theater, Off-Broadway	
1995	Your Obituary Is A Dance	Nella Rae	Actors Theatre of Louisville, Kentucky	
2002	Voice of Good Hope	Barbara Jordan	Luna Stage, New Jersey	
