= Ghostwriter (1992 TV series) =

Mystery television series

- Genre: Educational; Children's; Mystery; Fantasy
- Developed by: Pamela Douglas
- Starring: Todd Alexander; Blaze Berdahl; David López; Marcella Lowery; Mayteana Morales; Tram-Anh Tran; William Hernandez; Melissa González; Lateaka Vinson; Sheldon Turnipseed
- Composers: Gail "Sky" King; Peter Wetzler
- Countries of origin: United States; United Kingdom (seasons 1–2)
- Original language: English
- No. of seasons: 3
- No. of episodes: 74 (18 story arcs, with four episodes in each arc, except 1 and 5, which have five episodes) (list of episodes)

Production
- Executive producer: Liz Nealon
- Producer: George Barimo
- Production locations: Brooklyn, New York
- Running time: 30 minutes
- Production companies: Children's Television Workshop; BBC Television (seasons 1–2)

Original release
- Network: PBS; BBC Two
- Release: October 4, 1992 – February 12, 1995

Related
- Ghostwriter (2019–2022)

Ghostwriter is an educational children's mystery television series produced by Children's Television Workshop (now known as Sesame Workshop) and BBC Television. The series revolves around a multiethnic group of friends from Brooklyn who solve neighborhood crimes and mysteries as a team of youth detectives with the help of a ghost named Ghostwriter. Ghostwriter can communicate with children only by manipulating whatever text and letters he can find and using them to form words and sentences. The series was filmed on location in Fort Greene, Brooklyn. It began airing on PBS on October 4, 1992, and the last episode aired on February 12, 1995. It reran on Noggin, a channel co-founded by the Children's Television Workshop, from 1999 to 2003.

== Premise ==
The series is designed to teach reading, writing, and critical thinking skills to schoolchildren. Each mystery is presented as a case, covering four 30-minute episodes (except for the first and fifth story arc, where there are five 30 minute episodes); children are encouraged to follow each mystery and use the reading and writing clues given to attempt to solve them just as the Ghostwriter team does. Supervising producer Miranda Barry recalled arguing strongly for filming the series on location in the real setting of Fort Greene, Brooklyn, and noted that there was a year long gap between the pilot and the filming of the rest of the episodes.

== Episodes ==
Season	Episodes	Originally released	
Season	Episodes	First released	Last released
1	34	October 4, 1992	May 16, 1993
2	28	September 12, 1993	April 24, 1994
Special		September 18, 1994	
3	12	September 25, 1994	February 12, 1995

== Cast ==
- Sheldon Turnipseed as Jamal Jenkins
- Blaze Berdahl as Lenni Frazier
- David López as Alex Fernández
- Mayteana Morales as Gaby Fernández (1992–1994)
- Tram-Anh Tran as Tina Nguyen
- Todd Alexander as Rob Baker (1992–1993)
- William Hernandez as Héctor Carrero (1993–1995)
- Melissa Gonzalez as Gaby Fernández (1994–1995)
- Lateaka Vinson as Casey Austin (1994–1995)
- Marcella Lowery as Grandma CeCe Jenkins

== Critics and merchandise ==
Ghostwriter was critically acclaimed and honored for presenting a realistic, ethnically diverse world in its two-hour mystery stories. By the end of its third season, Ghostwriter ranked in the top five of all children's shows on American television.

In a 2011 retrospective, Alyssa Rosenberg praised the show for showing kids tackling realistic problems in their neighborhood. The Atlantic in 2016 called the series "The Most Literary '90s Kids Show" and praised it for being "about relatable kids who learned that their written words actually mattered."

Created as an integrated, branded, multi-media project, the Ghostwriter brand included magazines and teacher's guides, software (Microsoft), home video, games/licensed product, and other outreach materials that reached over a million children each month. There were many Ghostwriter novels released, both novelizations of the TV episodes and new stories. They were released by Bantam Books.

Noggin's website featured exclusive casebook files based on the show.

== Broadcast and home release ==
Ghostwriter has been broadcast in 24 countries worldwide, and generated a number of foreign-language adaptations, including a dubbed over version on Discovery Kids in Latin America marketed as Fantasma Escritor.

Despite its popularity, the program was abruptly canceled after the third season due to inadequate funding after the BBC pulled out of co-producing the show. The original series was rerun from 1995 to 1999 on PBS. From 1999 to 2003, it aired on the Noggin cable network, which was jointly founded by the Children's Television Workshop (now known as Sesame Workshop) with MTV Networks. In the U.K. it aired on the BBC and the Disney Channel at different times. The show's revival The New Ghostwriter Mysteries also aired on Noggin as part of its nighttime programming blocks, The Hubbub and The N.

=== VHS releases ===
During the mid-1990s, Ghostwriter was released on VHS by Republic Pictures Home Video. The company released "Ghost Story", "Who Burned Mr. Brinker's Store?", and "Into the Comics" with their respective story-arc episodes edited together into a feature-length format.

=== DVD releases ===
Ghostwriter: Season One DVD cover art.

Shout! Factory released Season 1 of Ghostwriter on DVD on June 8, 2010. Its supplements are a trivia game and a casebook. The entire series except for the last two story arcs were also released by GPN.

== Awards and nominations ==
- Writers Guild of America, United States, 1995
  - Won, WGA Award (TV) for Children's Script—Carin Greenberg Baker, for "Don't Stop The Music".
- Young Artist Awards, 1993
  - Nominated, Outstanding Performers in a Children's Program: Todd Alexander, Blaze Berdahl, David López, Mayteana Morales, Tram-Anh Tran, Sheldon Turnipseed

== Ghostwriter's identity ==
Ghostwriter producer and writer Kermit Frazier revealed in a 2010 interview that Ghostwriter was a runaway slave during the American Civil War. He taught other slaves how to read and write and was killed by slave catchers and their dogs. His spirit was kept in the book that Jamal discovers and opens in the pilot episode, freeing the ghost.

== Radio series ==
In 2006, BBC School Radio produced a radio series of Ghostwriter for primary school students. Character names from the TV series were retained, though voiced by new children. Music and the theme song were also kept, and a new arranged jingle for children to recognize Ghostwriter's appearances was created by Sesame Workshop.

== Revivals ==
=== The New Ghostwriter Mysteries ===
Official logo of The New Ghostwriter Mysteries

In 1997, CBS aired a new version of the series, The New Ghostwriter Mysteries, as part of their educational Think CBS Kids block, but it was canceled after one season due to low ratings. The new series had little in common with the original, changing Ghostwriter's on-screen appearance, introducing entirely new characters, and getting rid of the serial format of the original series. The series was filmed in Toronto, Ontario, Canada, and featured a new team of three kids: Camella Gorik (Charlotte Sullivan), Emilie Robeson (Erica Luttrell), and Henry "Strick" Strickland (Kristian Ayre). Ghostwriter only had two colors, which were silver and gold. Production locations included Toronto, Ontario, Canada, and New York, United States of America. Episodes ran for 22-24 minutes. Production companies were Children's Television Workshop and Decode Entertainment. It aired on CBS (CBS Preschoolers) (United States) and CBC Television (CBC Preschoolers) (Canada).

=== Ghostwriter (2019 TV series) ===
A revival of Ghostwriter aired on Apple TV+, premiering on November 1, 2019. The series was nominated for eight Daytime Emmy Awards.

A spin-off, Ghostwriter: Beyond the Page, premiered on April 1, 2021.
