= Chiura =

Chiura may refer to:

- Chiura Obata (1885 – 1975), a Japanese-American art teacher
- Flattened rice, called chiura in Nepal
