= A Place Where Sunflowers Grow =

Children's book by Amy Lee-Tai

A Place Where Sunflowers Grow is the best-known work by the Japanese-American author Amy Lee-Tai. Illustrated by Felicia Hoshino, the children's book tells the story of Mari, a young Japanese-American girl, whose family was interned in Topaz War Relocation Center in Utah during World War II. The story is set during the summertime when Mari's art class has begun and explores the perspective of a child matriculating in an internment camp. Mari wonders if anything could grow and bloom at Topaz, and finds solace and comfort through the help of her teacher, her kind parents, and a new childhood friend.

Amy Lee-Tai contends that she considers A Place Where Sunflowers Grow to be a story demonstrating the possibility of beauty growing in what seems like a hopeless and baron environment. While the story itself is fiction, Lee-Tai derived her inspiration for the story from her family's experiences of internment and crafted the narrative to illuminate a perspective from the eyes of a child. A Place Where Sunflowers Grow is utilized by teachers and book clubs around the country to help teach children about this chapter of American history. Reviews of the book are generally positive and emphasize its usefulness in connecting young readers to characters of similar age to best teach children lessons on Japanese American incarceration during World War II.

== Inspiration and publication ==
Amy Lee-Tai's inspiration for writing A Place Where Sunflowers Grow stemmed from her desire to write a children's book about her grandmother, Hisako Hibi. Lee-Tai's maternal family was interned at Topaz, one of the ten Japanese internment camps. After Lee-Tai's grandfather's passing, Hisako Hibi continued to create her artwork while raising her two children in poverty. Lee-Tai explained that she derived her inspiration for A Place Where Sunflowers Grow from her grandmother's story, keeping the importance of artwork as the focal point of the narrative. Lee-Tai "wanted more people to know about her courageous story as well as her artwork."

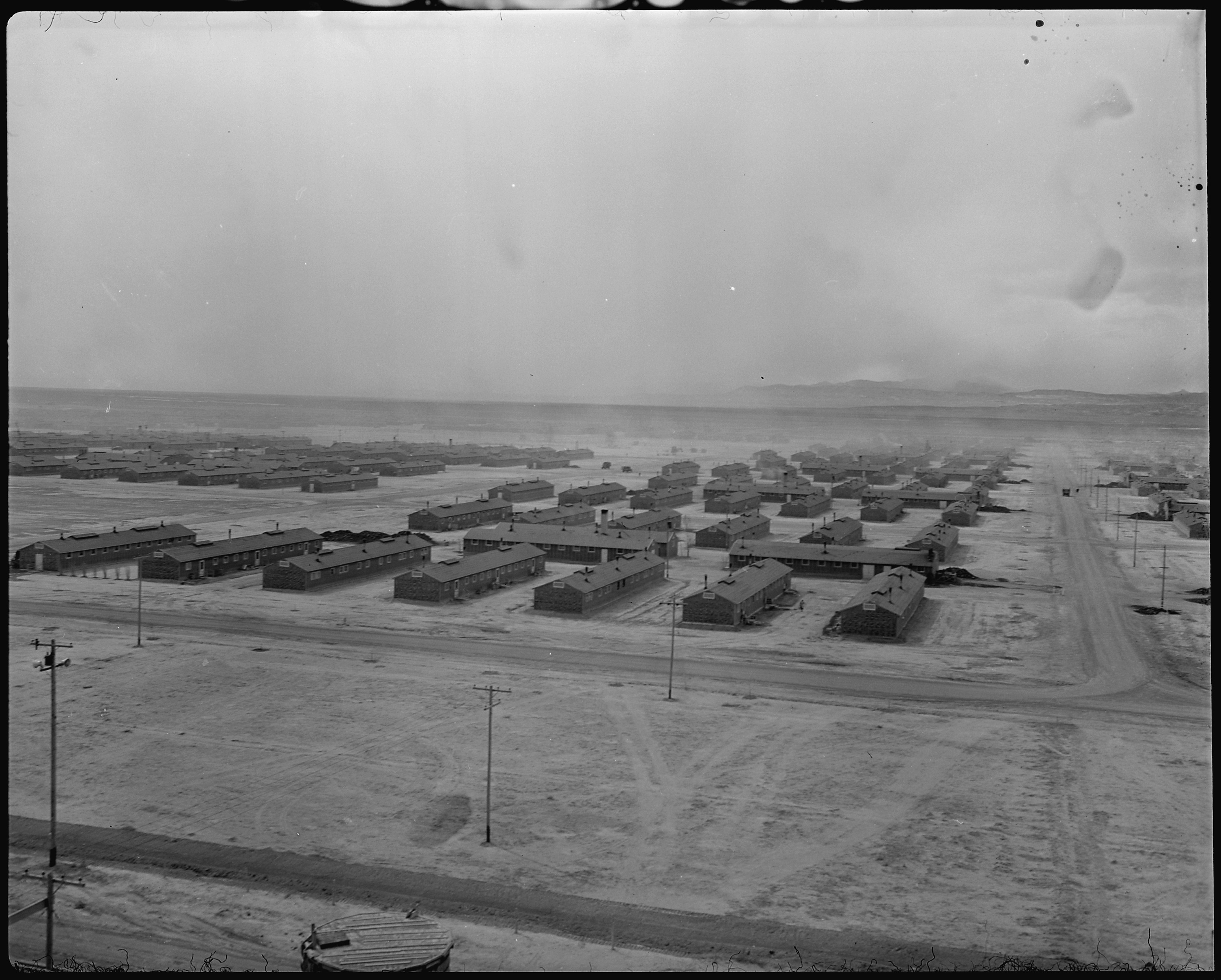
Topaz War Relocation Center

Lee-Tai was approached by Children's Book Press to write a manuscript on the Topaz Art School given her family's connection to its establishment and teachings. Her grandfather and grandmother helped establish Topaz Art School and were both art teachers to young students; Lee-Tai's mother and uncle were among the students who attended Topaz Art School. Lee-Tai explained in an interview that the result was a "work of historical fiction inspired by my family's internment experience."

The book was published in 2006 by Children's Book Press in San Francisco, California.

== Plot summary ==
Mari, a young Japanese-American girl, and her family are among the 120,000 inhabitants of the United States who in 1942 had been sent to live at the internment camps during World War II. Mari and her family have been interned at Topaz War Relocation Center for thirteen months after being displaced from their small home in California. Mari reflects upon her feelings of homesickness and frustration. She was forced to move away from her home although "she hadn't done anything wrong."

The story begins with Mari navigating the internment camp's sandy environment as she plants sunflower seeds with her mother in her family's barracks' yard. She wonders if anything could possibly grow under the dry grains of sand.

Mari is reminded by her father "Papa" that it is time to go to her very first class at Topaz Art School. During the walk she passes a plethora of armed soldiers, causing her to walk in fear and silence, clutching Papa's arm tightly. After arriving to class, she is instructed by her teacher, Mrs. Hanamoto, to "have fun and draw anything you like," but Mari struggles with thinking of an idea and leaves her paper blank as the class ends.

The next day Mari returns to class, uneasy of Mrs. Hanamoto instructions to this time draw "anything that makes you happy at Topaz." Mrs. Hanamoto notices Mari's blank paper, and instead instructs her to draw anything that made her happy before living in Topaz. With these instructions, Mari knew right away what to draw: her backyard in California. Mari's drawing of her family's backyard draws the attention from her classmate, Aiko, who comments on how fun Mari's backyard appears in the drawing. Mari and Aiko quickly become friends and establish a tradition of always walking home from art class together.

Mari grows to enjoy drawing memories of her life before Topaz at her art class. She begins to display her drawings around her family's barracks. Mari becomes inquisitive about her family's internment as well. She asks Papa questions revolving around why her family has been interned at Topaz, why everyone at the camp is Japanese-American, and if she will ever get to see her old home again. Papa turns to Japanese philosophy, citing the cycle of life in which "spring comes after winter, and flowers bloom again." He implores Mari to continue being hopeful.

Three months have past and the narrative returns to Topaz Art School, where, for the first time, Mari volunteers to share her artwork to her classmates. Mari holds up a drawing of her family's barracks with two very large sunflowers growing to the side. Her drawing is met with smiles from Aiko and Mrs. Hanamoto. After class, Mari and Aiko walk home together and are surprised when they see sunflower buds poking out from the ground. The narrative concludes with Mari's feelings of hope flourishing at the sight of her growing sunflowers, and she remarks that her life after the war now "didn't seem so far away."

== Illustrations ==
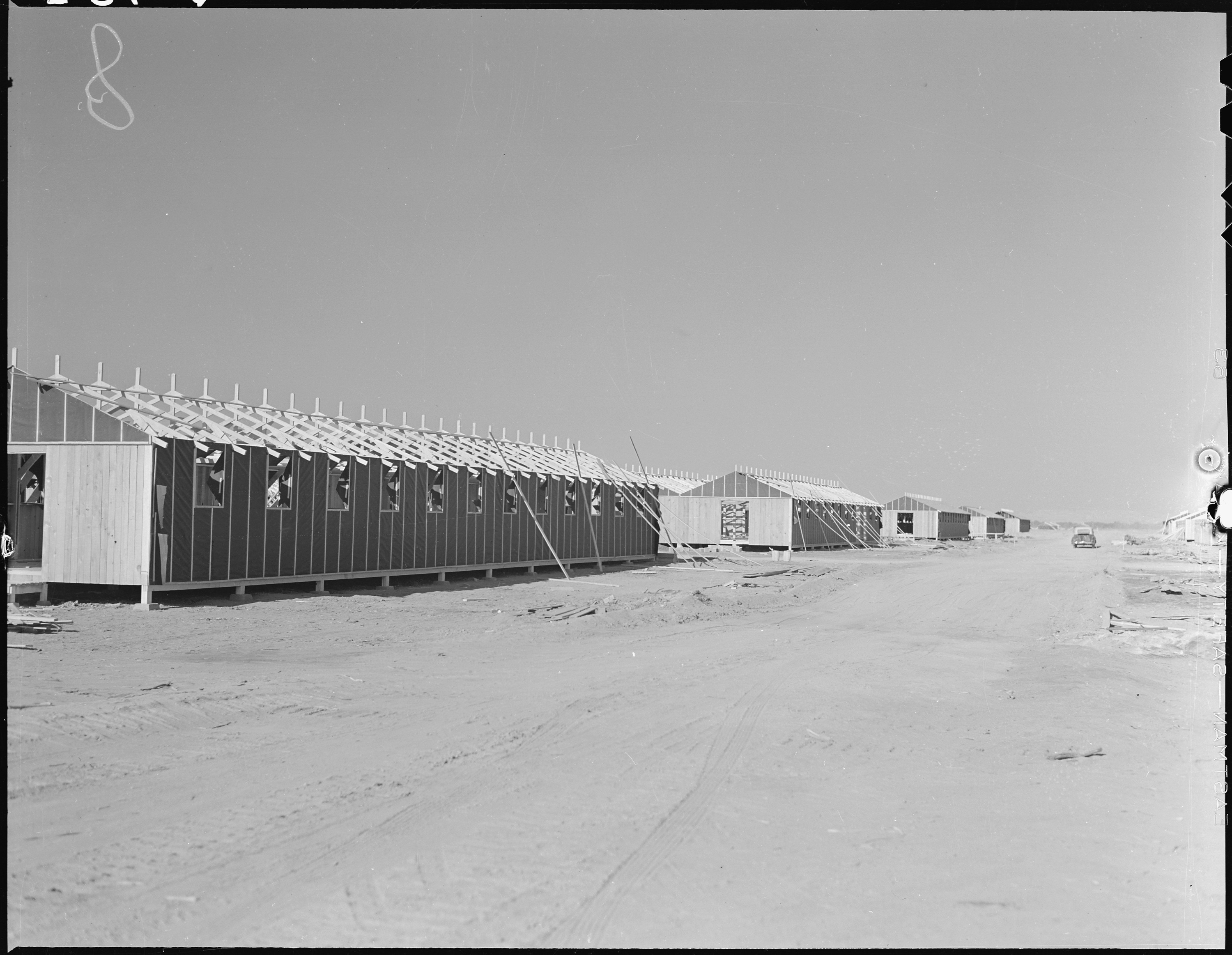
Barracks at Poston War Relocation Center

Lee-Tai explains in an interview that illustrator Felicia Hoshino based her drawings on Lee-Tai’s grandmother’s artwork. Similar to Lee-Tai, Hoshino also has a familial connection to Japanese American internment camps. Her father’s family was interned at Poston War Relocation Center in Arizona.

When asked about the resources used to create the artwork in "A Place Where Sunflowers Grow" Hoshino explained that she used a “yearbook-like booklet” containing snapshots of internees at Poston Relocation Camp. Hoshino combined the knowledge gleaned from these snapshots with research she conducted at Smithsonian’s National Japanese American Historical Society to formulate a complete approach to illustrating the book. Hoshino explained that the “most inspiring resources came from the author’s mother,” who lent Hoshino a collection of Lee-Tai’s grandmother’s actual sketches from Topaz.

== Use in educational settings ==
Educational Reception

Authors have written a plethora of children’s and young adult’s books on the incarceration of Japanese-Americans during World War II with the intent to educate youth. A Place Where Sunflowers Grow has been utilized in classroom settings for young readers to connect with Mari and her experience in being an internee. When asked about the effectiveness of children’s literature on the topic of Japanese Internment author Barry Deneberg writes:

"Two thirds of internees were in their early twenties or younger and nearly six thousand babies were born in the camps. The internment experience was a family experience. More than in any other event in American History, kids were the central focus of the story." Thus it is understandable why so many of these books continue to resonate with young readers today.”

The Big Read Program

In November of 2017 Lee-Tai spoke at an event hosted by Hope College known as “The Big Read,” one of the educational programs where she read A Place Where Sunflowers Grow to an audience of children and fielded questions. Lee-Tai writes in her blog on this program:

"Whenever I share my book and give a program, I walk a fine line between educating kids about this dark chapter of American history and trying to inspire feelings of hope for their lives and our country. It feels like, and is, a tremendous responsibility."

Book Reviews:

A Place Where Sunflowers Grow has been met with many positive reviews and support for its effectiveness on educating children, specifically. Elizabeth Bush, a book reviewer for The Bulletin of the Center for Children’s Books, writes:

"Opening and closing notes supply family and historical background, and the graceful lines of Japanese translation that accompany each block of English text will fascinate children who like to 'follow along.'"
