= Kazue Togasaki =

Kazue Togasaki (June 29, 1897 – December 15, 1992) was one of the earliest women with Japanese ancestry to earn a medical degree in the United States.

== Early life ==
Kazue Togasaki was born on June 29, 1897, in San Francisco, California, to Japanese immigrants, Shige Kushida and Kikumatsu Togasaki. Her father studied law and her mother came from a family of merchants. Togasaki's father's unemployment resulted in her parents opening a store selling Japanese tea, rice, and chinaware. She was the eldest daughter and the second born in a family of nine children. Kazue Togasaki was described by her family as a strong-willed and domineering figure in the household. She planned out her younger siblings’ courses in order to get them on the right track into the medical field. Many of her siblings went on to practice medicine, after she became a doctor. Mitsuye Togasaki Shide (fourth-born sister) and Chiye Togasaki Yamanaka (sixth-born sister) both became registered nurses after obtaining their RN degree, Yoshiye Togasaki (fifth-born sister) and Teru Togasaki (seventh-born sister) both obtained their MD degrees and became physicians, and Yaye Togasaki Breitenbach (eight-born sister) became a psychiatrist for the Veterans Administration. Kazue Togasaki's brothers held careers in politics, journalism and computer science.

Togasaki came from a family of devout Christians; therefore, they regularly welcomed immigrants arriving from Japan and offered them a place in their home. After the 1906 earthquake in San Francisco, Togasaki's mother Shige Kushida turned a church into a hospital. At nine years old, Togasaki along with her siblings helped their mother by translating for immigrant women to doctors. These charitable acts became a norm within the family and was most likely the greatest influence for the daughters in their future careers in medicine.

Togasaki applied to different medical schools; however, at the time, medical schools were highly discriminatory towards women and Japanese Americans. She was accepted at Women's Medical College of Pennsylvania and became one of the first Japanese American women to earn a doctorate of medicine in the United States. She set an example for her sisters, and soon after, her sisters followed in her footsteps and became physicians and registered nurses.

== Education ==
During her childhood, Kazue Togasaki and her brothers went to an all-Japanese school. Their schooling occurred during widespread school segregation against Japanese Americans, prevalent until the Gentlemen's Agreement in 1907. This agreement served to desegregate schools for Japanese children and limit restrictions placed on Japanese immigrants in exchange for Japan's curtailing of further emigration to the United States. After desegregation, Kazue Togasaki and her brothers continued to face discrimination from other white classmates. Togasaki's higher education began at UC Berkeley for two semesters, later transferring to Stanford in 1920, receiving her bachelor's degree in Zoology. Togasaki worked as a maid for one-year before going into a two-year nursing program. She received her RN degree at the Children's Hospital School of Nursing in 1924; however, due to the discrimination against Japanese nurses, she was unable to work in the hospital where she received her training. When she lost her nursing job, she decided to get another degree in public health at the University of California in 1927. After obtaining her degree in public health, following the outspoken beliefs of her parents, Togasaki decided to apply for medical school and enrolled in a medical school in 1929. Togasaki earned her medical degree from the Woman's Medical College of Pennsylvania in 1933.

== Career ==
Kazue Togasaki started her career in the medical field as a nurse; however, due to her parents’ opinions about education, she decided to become a physician instead. She worked as a fundraiser and secretary, and after that studied public health nursing at the University of California for one year, before enrolling in medical school in 1929. After the bombing of Pearl Harbor, Kazue Togasaki, her father, and most of her siblings, along with other Japanese Americans, were detained by the US government; however, some of Togasaki's siblings were not incarcerated because they were away for work. During World War II she was detained for a month at the Tanforan Assembly Center, and she was asked to start providing medical services, such as administering vaccinations, delivering babies, and more, to other Japanese detainees who were held at the center. While there, she delivered fifty babies and led an all-Japanese-American medical team. She was afterwards sent five times to other assembly and relocation centers (including Topaz, Tule Lake, and Manzanar) before being let out in 1943. In 1947, after World War II, Kazue returned to San Francisco to continue her medical practice. She then opened a medical practice in San Francisco, where she worked until she retired at the age of 75. Togasaki's devotion obstetrics and gynecology has helped built her reputation as a pillar in the Japanese American community, as she never once took days off from work for a vacation. Throughout her career, she has helped deliver thousands of babies.

During her earlier career, she often treated Japanese women, but later on in her career, she began treating a more diverse group of patients. During the time that she had the medical practice, Kazue Togasaki remembered her charitable roots and treated families regardless of their ability to pay. She opened her own home to unwed mothers and terminally ill patients. Togasaki also often invited unwed mothers to stay at her house, delivered their babies, and helped the mothers through the adoption process. She also extended her hands to house Japanese American students who were there to study at the University of California. In 1970, she was recognized as one of the "Most Distinguished Women of 1970" by the San Francisco Examiner for all of her good deeds.

Other women of Japanese ancestry that studied medicine in the United States around the same time include: Keiko Okami, who earned her medical degree in 1889, and Megumi Shinoda, who earned her medical degree in 1933.

== Death ==
She retired from her profession at the age of 75. When Togasaki's memory began to fail her, she persisted for twenty years with Alzheimer's disease before she died on December 15, 1992, at the age of 95.

== See also ==
- List of female scientists in the 20th century
