= Hisako Hibi =

Hisako Shimizu Hibi
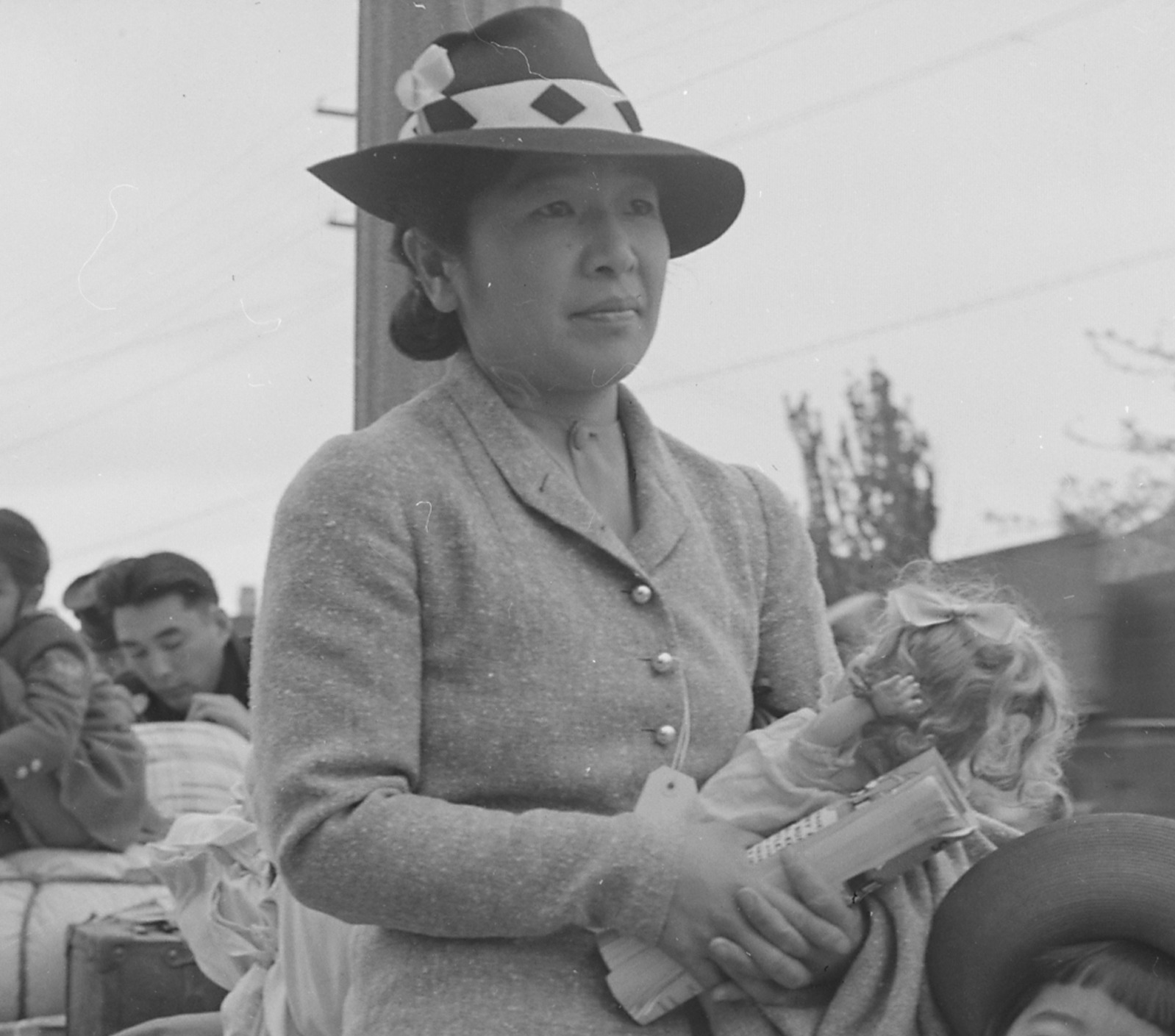
- Hisako Shimizu in 1942
- Born: Hisako Shimizu; May 14, 1907; Torihama, Fukui, Japan
- Died: October 25, 1991 (aged 84); San Francisco, California
- Occupations: Painter, teacher and printmaker
- Years active: 1927–1991
- Known for: 72 paintings while interned in Tanforan and Topaz
- Spouse(s): Matsusaburo 'George' Hibi (1886–1947)
- Children: Satoshi (son, b.1931); Ibuki (daughter, b.1937)

Hisako Shimizu Hibi (May 14, 1907 – October 25, 1991) was a Japanese-born American Issei painter and printmaker. Hibi attended the California School of Fine Arts in San Francisco, California, where she garnered experience and recognition in the fine arts and community art-exhibition. Here, she met her husband George Matsusaburo Hibi, with whom she raised two children, Satoshi "Tommy" Hibi and Ibuki Hibi.

Well-known for the large collection of paintings she created during her internment (1942-1946) at the American internment camps Tanforan and Topaz, Hibi assisted in founding and teaching art schools for interned children. Her work adds to a small collection of images from within the internment camps, as a consequence of censorship codes in the Executive Order 9066 that severely limited what images could be shown to the American public.

After internment, Hibi moved to New York City, where she obtained U.S. citizenship and pursued further education by enrolling in courses at the Museum of Modern Art. On June 30, 1947, Hibi's husband, George Matsusaburo, died from cancer shortly after his sixty-fifth birthday. Subsequently, Hibi returned to San Francisco, where she continued to exhibit her work in galleries, garnered recognition, and explored various alternative art styles before her eventual passing in 1991.

== Early years (1907–1941) ==
Hisako Hibi was born on May 14, 1907, in Torihama, a farming village located in the Fukui Prefecture, Japan. Hibi was born into a Buddhist family. She was the eldest of six children and stayed with her grandmother after her parents moved to the United States. Upon joining her parents in Seattle, Washington in 1920, the Hibi family moved shortly thereafter to Los Angeles, California. On account of her father's business success, Hibi's family returned to Japan in 1925. Hibi remained in California, graduating from Lowell High School in San Francisco, California in 1929, where she'd begun creating art and learning English.

Following graduation, Hibi studied western-style oil painting at the California School of Fine Arts and participated in annual exhibitions at the San Francisco Art Association.

While at the school, she met fellow student and painter George Matsusaburo Hibi, who was more than twenty years her senior, and the two were married in 1930. In 1933, the couple moved first to Mount Eden, and then to Hayward, California, where they raised their children, Ibuki Hibi Lee and Satoshi Hibi. Throughout the 1930s and early 40s, Hibi exhibited with fellow artists including Elmer Bischoff, David Park, Karl Kasten, and Earle Loran, all of whom are renowned and were active in California.

== Internment (1942–1945) ==
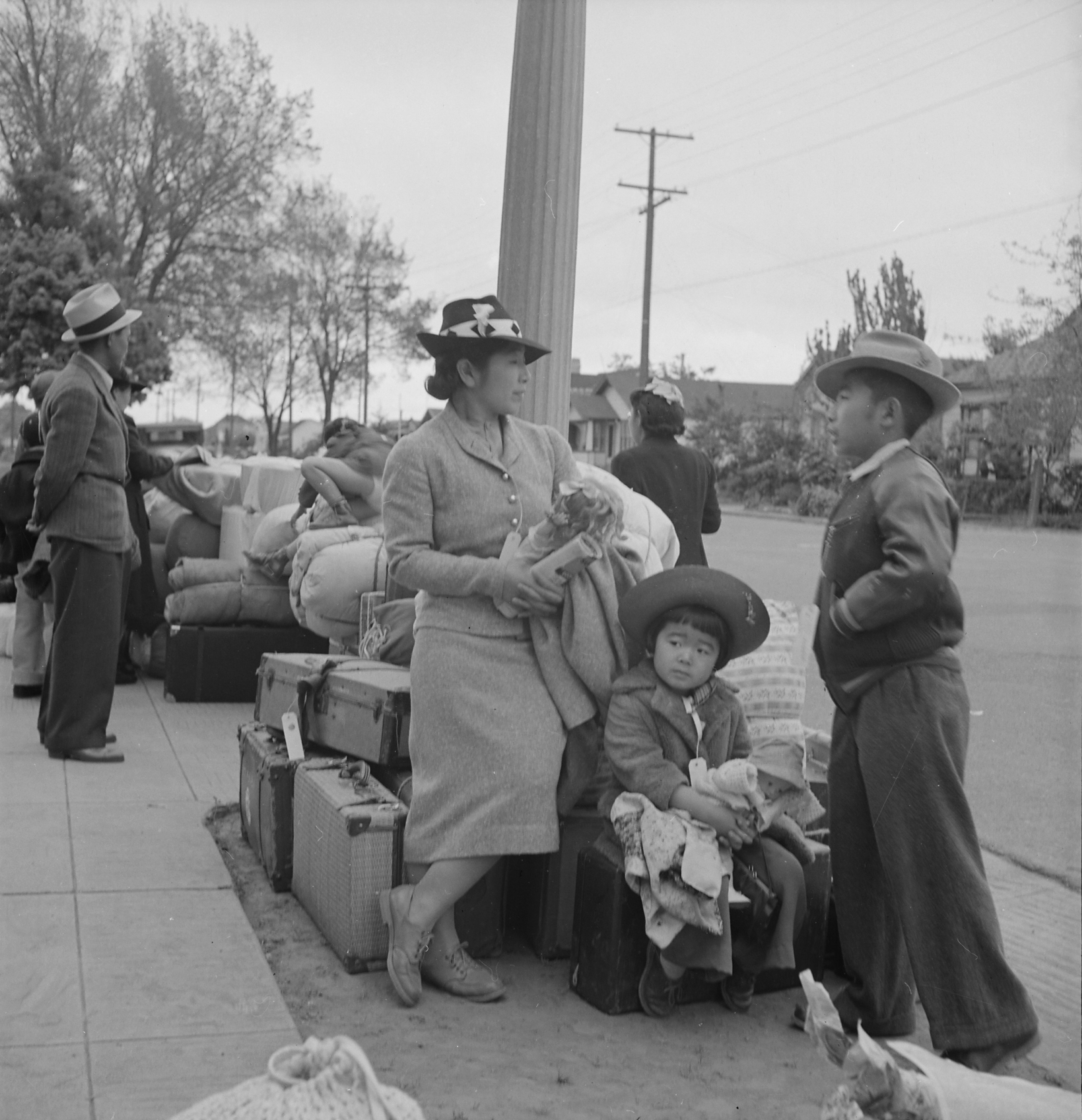
Hisako Hibi awaits evacuation with her son, Satoshi, and daughter, Ibuki, in Hayward, California on 8 May 1942, by Dorothea Lange for the WRA

In 1942, over 100,000 Japanese Americans underwent mandatory displacement of life, vocation, and recreation through the Executive Order 9066. With forced removal imminent, Hibi and her husband donated their paintings to different venues in the Hayward community, to express their thanks because they couldn't bring the work with them to internment camps for the duration of World War II. The Hibi family was first moved to the Tanforan Assembly Center in May and then to a more permanent camp at Topaz, Utah in September. Photographer and friend to the Hibi family, Dorothea Lange took a snapshot on May 8, 1942 of Hibi and her daughter Ibuki as they stood next to what was left of their belongings. In this photo, Ibuki Hibi, five years old, and her mother, Hisako Hibi, hold onto dolls as they await the internment busses that transport them to the Tanforan Assembly Center.

During their internment, Japanese Americans faced restrictions on owning or using cameras, and so turned to other artistic media. Hisako Hibi, known for her artistic prowess, became involved in teaching children's art classes at both Tanforan and Topaz. Hisako Hibi, and other internment artist, Miné Okubo, found art as a means to express community discontent as well as a way to create a historical record of life in internment. Their artistic strides effectively defied government restrictions being placed around photography and camp documentation and played a crucial role in capturing these experiences.

While raising her two children in the camp, Hisako documented her experiences through her paintings, an example being Laundry Room (1944). The painting depicts how the camp bathing facilities were inadequate for the inmates, which resulted in the mothers improvising a bathing area by washing their children in the laundry room.

== Postwar years (1946–1991) ==
After the war, the Hibis relocated to New York City. When George Hibi died in 1947, Hibi took up work as a seamstress in a garment factory to support herself and her children. She later returned to school, studying under Victor D'Amico at the Museum of Modern Art, which influenced her painting style as it became increasingly abstract.

In 1953, Hibi became a U.S. citizen, taking advantage of the Immigration and Nationality Act of 1952. A year later, she moved back to San Francisco with her daughter, Ibuki Hibi Lee, while her son, Satoshi Hibi, went to Utah for college. In 1954, Hibi worked as a housekeeper for Marcell Labaudt, who directed the Lucien Labaudt Gallery. During this time, she was able to work in a studio in Labaudt's garage. She remained entrenched in West Coast art culture until Hibi died on October 25, 1991, in San Francisco, at the age of 84.

== Art works ==
=== Internment (April 1944-October 1944) ===
At Tanforan, the Hibis and several other interned professional artists, including Byron Takashi Tsuzuki and Miné Okubo, organized the Tanforan Art School under the leadership of Chiura Obata within the first month of internment. Hibi's work from Tanforan offers an uncommon perspective for an era of art dominated by men, as many of her paintings explore themes of femininity and motherhood. Following the Obata family's departure from the camp in 1943, Matsusaburo and Hisako Hibi assumed leadership of the Topaz Art School. The Hibis led the institution with their strong desire to bridge Eastern and Western traditions through the medium of art.

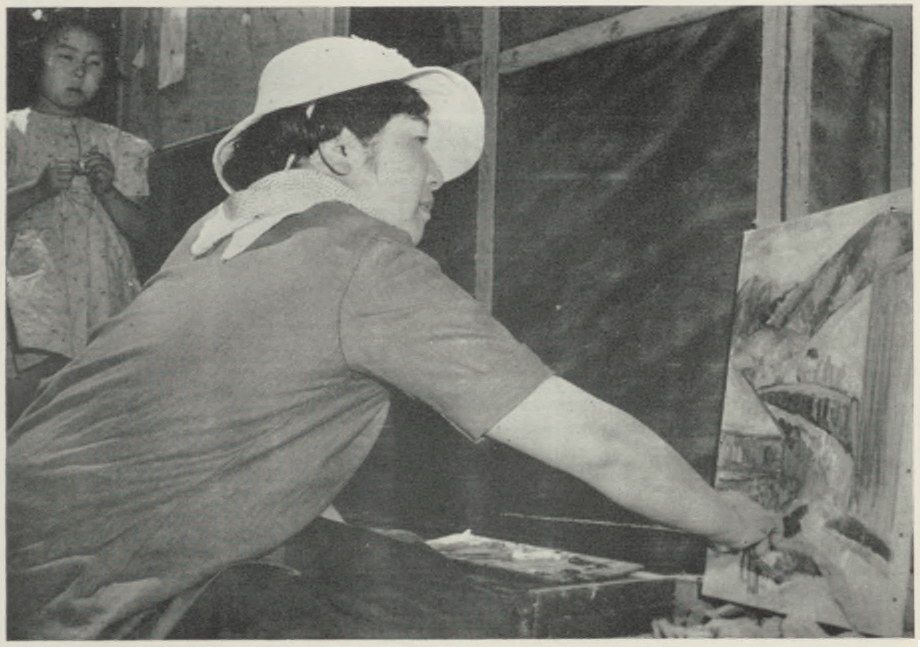
Hibi demonstrates painting at Tanforan Assembly Center (1942). The painting is entitled Barrack 9, Apt. 6, San Bruno, California.

While interned in Tanforan and Topaz, Hibi created seventy-two paintings and taught classes in drawing, painting (oil and watercolor) and sculpture to students at the Topaz Art School, which was the resumption of the Tanforan Art School. While both Hibi and her husband George were influenced by late nineteenth-century European and American painters, Hibi was particularly influenced by the work of Mary Cassatt. Many of her oil paintings from the camp years depict the intimate daily life of mothers at work, the cold sterility of the barracks, and images such as persimmons and New Year's rice cakes, that symbolized a nostalgia for a previous life. In 1943, she received a prize for a still life of flowers that was exhibited in a show of work made by incarcerated artists that was held at the Friends Center in Cambridge, Massachusetts.

=== Post-internment (1945–1985) ===
Art was important to Hibi; she mentioned that her art kept her at peace and happy after the struggles she went through in the U.S. In the postwar years, Hibi exhibited widely in the Bay Area, where, in 1970, her first solo exhibit was held at the Lucien Labaudt Gallery, where George’s art had been exhibited in 1962. In 1985, the San Francisco Arts Commission presented Hibi with an Award of Honor, and mounted a major solo exhibition Hisako Hibi, Her Path at the Somar Gallery. She was an early member of the Asian American Women Artists Association.

Post internment, Hibi's artwork and approach to artistic expression in paintings evolved. Initially inspired by Western approaches like figuration and landscapes, much of which is seen in her internment artwork, Hibi moved to take inspiration from Japanese styles through abstraction and spiritual depictions. She abandoned sketching all together in her process, instead favoring paint worked directly onto canvas. In Hibi's more recent work, one can find her exploration of this more abstract art style, for example, in one of her six post-war paintings, Autumn (1970).

Hisako Hibi's most-known artworks
Name	Size	Medium	Year	Location	View the painting
Homeage to Mary Cassat	24x20 in.	Oil on canvas	1943	Topaz, Utah	The Hisako Hibi Gallery
Windy	20x24 in	Oil on canvas	1944	Topaz, Utah	The Hisako Hibi Gallery
Topaz, Utah	16x20 in.	Oil on canvas	1945	Topaz, Utah	The Hisako Hibi Gallery
Frightful New York	24x20 in.	Oil on canvas	1946	New York	The Hisako Hibi Gallery
Waiting for a Bus to Work	24x20 in.	Oil on canvas	1955	San Francisco, California	The Hisako Hibi Gallery
Autumn	38.5x31.5 in.	Oil on canvas	1970	San Francisco, California	The Hisako Hibi Gallery
War and Suffering	35x42 in.	Oil on canvas	1982	San Francisco, California	The Hisako Hibi Gallery
Construction	39x31 in.	Oil on canvas	1985	San Francisco, California	The Hisako Hibi Gallery

=== Other artworks ===
- "Hisako Hibi Collection". Japanese American National Museum.
- "Guide to the Hisako Hibi Collection". Online Archive of California. 13 November 2000.
- Hibi, Hisako (May 1945). "Dinnertime". Oakland Museum of California Collections.
- Hibi, Hisako (1948). "Fear". Los Angeles County Museum of Art.
- "Hibi, Hisako". Asian American Arts Centre. 1943–1980.
- Hibi, Hisako (1943–1985). "The Hisako Hibi Gallery". Asian American Books.
- Hisako Hibi. Smithsonian American Art Museum.

== Exhibitions ==
Hibi's works were featured in the exhibit, Pictures of Belonging: Miki Hayakawa, Hisako Hibi, and Miné Okubo. This traveling exhibit was shown at the University of Utah, Utah Museum of Fine Arts (February 24–June 30, 2024) and will travel to the Smithsonian American Art Museum(November 15, 2024–August 17, 2025), the Pennsylvania Academy of the Fine Arts (October 2, 2025–January 4, 2026), Monterey Museum of Art (February 5, 2026–April 19, 2026), and Japanese American National Museum (late 2026). The accompanying catalog, Pictures of Belonging: Miki Hayakawa, Hisako Hibi, and Miné Okubo, edited by ShiPu Wang, was published in December 2023.

== Legacy ==
Hibi's memoir, Peaceful Painter: Memoirs of an Issei Woman Artist was edited by her daughter, Ibuki H. Lee, and published posthumously in 2004 by Heyday Books, along with an accompanying exhibition at the Japanese American National Museum. Hibi's granddaughter, Amy Lee-Tai, wrote a children's book based on the experiences of the Hibi family in Topaz. She titled it A Place Where Sunflowers Grow and the book was published by Children's Book Press in 2006.

Although Hibi's art has featured in many well known exhibits, such as the Smithsonian American Art Museum, much of it has been lost or displaced. A neighbor from Hayward, who stored several of the family's paintings during internment, died in 1954, depleting what is known to be left of Hibi's early works. In addition, Ibuki Lee recounted finding selections from Hibi's internment artwork in online marketplaces and garage sales.

Of the seventy-two remaining paintings that Hibi created while interned, one is in the collection of the Oakland Museum of California, one was given to the San Francisco Buddhist Church, seven are in a private collection, and sixty-three were donated to the Japanese American National Museum between 1996 and 1998. Some of the works that George Hibi created while interned are stored at UCLA.
