= George Matsusaburo Hibi =

- Born: Matsusaburo Hibi; June 21, 1886; Shiga Prefecture, Japan
- Died: June 30, 1947 (aged 61); New York City
- Education: California School of Fine Arts
- Spouse: Hisako, nee Shimizu (m. 1930–1947)

Matsusaburo "George" Hibi (Japanese: 日比松三郎; June 21, 1886 – June 30, 1947), was a Japanese-American artist. He was most known for his oil paintings and printmaking.

== Life and career ==
Hibi was born in Iimura, Japan on June 21, 1886, and attended university in Kyoto before he immigrated to the United States, in 1906. He studied law for a brief period in Seattle before moving to San Francisco in 1919, where he began submitting his drawings and cartoons to several California newspapers as well as Japanese publications. That same year, Hibi enrolled at the California School of Fine Arts. He eventually worked as a staff member, working in multiple capacities that included: gardening, custodian, sales clerk and as a teaching assistant, offering demonstrations on batik processes, and several other technical artistic skills, he offered demonstrations on the batik process.

Hibi's art work was heavily influenced by Paul Cézanne's style of art, where he uses plains of color follow by small brush strokes to slowly form complex fields.

Hibi participated in several group exhibitions in Northern California well throughout the 1920s and 1930s. He was one of the several founders of the East West Art Society. He helped to arrange the group's exhibition at the San Francisco Museum of Art in 1922, and the Amateur and Professional Artist Society in 1927.

In 1930, Hibi married Hisako Shimizu, an artist and fellow alumna from the California School of Fine Arts. They had two children and raised them in Hayward, California. In Hayward, Hibi began a Japanese-language school. In 1937, he had a solo show in which he presented ninety works. He was included in numerous group exhibitions at this time, in venues across California such as the California State Fair, Sacramento (1938) and the San Francisco Museum of Art (1939, 1940).

Following the signing of Executive Order 9066 in 1942 and for the remainder of World War II, Hibi and his family were held first in the Tanforan Assembly Center before being relocated to the Topaz internment camp in Utah. He continued to exhibit at the Oakland Art Gallery (1943) while incarcerated. Hibi served as the resident director of the art school at Topaz from 1943 to 1945, succeeding its founder, Prof. Chiura Obata. In 1943, while still living in Topaz, Hibi painted the Untitled (Winter Internment Scene) where he showcases the brutal winter at the internment camp in Topaz.

After their release, the Hibi family moved to New York City, where George found work painting lamp shades and Hisako was a seamstress. George Hibi died on June 30, 1947, of cancer.
