= Chiura Obata =

Japanese-American artist (1885–1975)

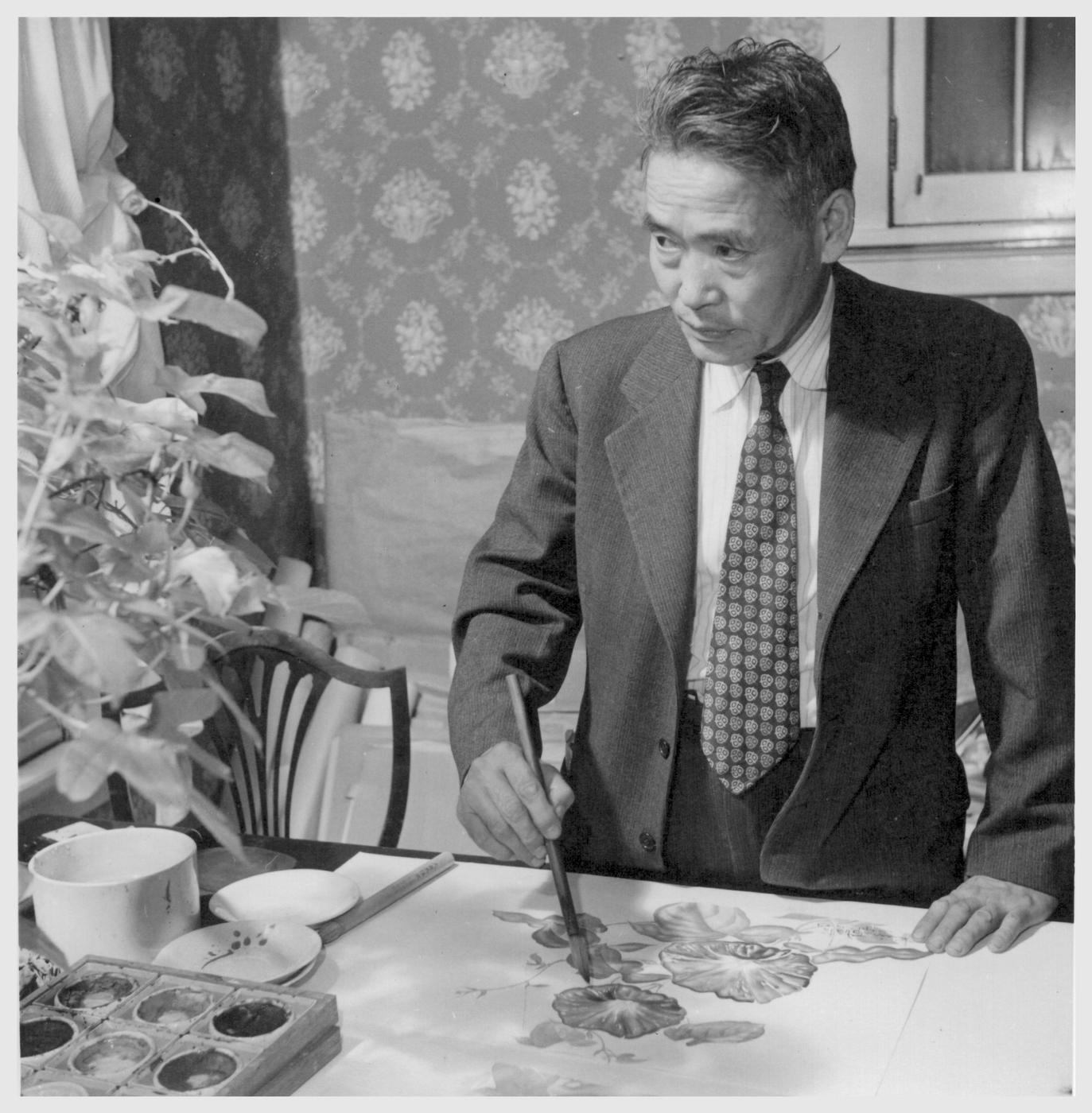
- Professor Chiura Obata painting in 1944
- Born: Zoroku Sato; November 18, 1885; Okayama, Japan
- Died: October 6, 1975 (aged 89); Berkeley, California
- Occupations: Painter, professor
- Years active: 1899–1975
- Spouse(s): Haruko Kohashi (1892–1989; m. 1912)
- Children: Kimio George (son, 1912–1986); Fujiko (daughter, 1915–?); Gyo (son, 1923–2022); Lillian Yuri (daughter, 1927–2018)

Chiura Obata (小圃 千浦, Obata Chiura; November 18, 1885 – October 6, 1975) was a well-known Japanese American artist and popular art teacher. A self-described "roughneck", Obata went to the United States in 1903, at age 17. After initially working as an illustrator and commercial decorator, he had a successful career as a painter, following a 1927 summer spent in the Sierra Nevada, and was a faculty member in the Art Department at the University of California, Berkeley, from 1932 to 1954, interrupted by World War II, when he spent a year in an internment camp, where he acted as the founding director of the art school at the Topaz incarceration camp in 1942. He later emerged as a leading figure in the Northern California art scene and as an influential educator, teaching at the University of California, Berkeley, for nearly twenty years. After his retirement, he continued to paint and to lead group tours to Japan to see gardens and art.

== Early life ==
Obata was born in 1885 in Okayama prefecture in Japan. He was the youngest of a very large family. At the age of five, he showed a natural inclination for drawing. He was then adopted by his older brother, Rokuichi, who was himself an artist and moved to Sendai, Miyagi prefecture. At the age of seven he began his formal training by a master painter in the art of sumi-e, Japanese ink and brush painting.

At the age of 14, Obata ran away from home to avoid being put into military school. In Tokyo, he joined the artist group, Nihon Bijutsuin (the Japan Art Institute), and became apprenticed to the painter Tanryo Murata for three years. He also studied with Kogyo Terasaki and Gaho Hasimoto. He was trained in Western as well as modern Japanese art with a focus on Japanese sumi ink-and-brush painting, painting throughout his life in the eclectic style. Shortly after he finished his apprenticeship, he received a prestigious art award in Tokyo.

== Early career ==
In 1903, Obata left for the United States. He arrived in Seattle, where he planned to study American art before continuing to Paris to study European art. When he got to San Francisco, he found work as a domestic servant in a household, with the pay of $1.50 per week plus room and board. He was one of the founders of the Fuji Club, the first Japanese-American baseball team on the American mainland. In 1906, Obata made on-site sketches of the aftermath of the San Francisco earthquake. In 1909 he worked in the hops fields in the Sacramento Valley.

Eventually, Obata was able to earn his living in California as an illustrator for different newspapers, including San Francisco's two Japanese newspapers, The New World and the Japanese American, and as a commercial designer. As a designer he decorated the famous Oriental rooms for Gump's department store and did similar work for the Emporium and City of Paris department stores, now known as City of Paris Dry Goods Co. He designed "Jewel Rooms" for the G. T. Mars Company and one in the Hotel Ambassador. He made five large murals for the Toyo Kisen Kaisha Steamship Company and for the Iwata Dry Goods Company.

From 1915 to 1917 Obata was an illustrator and cover page designer for the magazine Japan, published for the Toyo Kisen Kaisha Steamship Co., during which time he turned out about 3000 illustrations and numerous cover designs.

During the 1920s, Obata spent much time painting landscapes throughout California. In 1921, he co-founded the East West Art Society in San Francisco. On the invitation of Worth Ryder, a professor of art at UC Berkeley who had become a friend, Obata spent six weeks during the summer of 1927 on a sketching tour of Yosemite and the Sierra high country, producing over 100 new sketches and ink paintings in six weeks. The first exhibition Obata had for American audiences was in the following year, 1928.

== Initial successes ==
In 1928, after his father's death, Obata returned to Japan. There, in 1930, he supervised the production of 35 colored woodblock prints of California landscapes for his "World Landscape Series", the majority of which are views of Yosemite National Park in California. Published in limited editions of 100 by the Takamizawa Print Works in Japan, the prints were exhibited at the Eighty-Seventh Annual Exhibition at Ueno Park in Tokyo in 1930, where his painting of Lake Basin in the High Sierra won first prize. He left Tokyo shortly thereafter.

Beginning in 1930, Obata had many very successful exhibitions in California. One, in 1931 at the California Palace of the Legion of Honor, was a large exhibit of both his work and the work of his brother, Rokuichi.

In 1932 Obata was appointed as an instructor in the Art Department at the University of California, Berkeley. Between 1930 and 1941, one-man exhibitions of his work were held in numerous locations.

== World War II ==
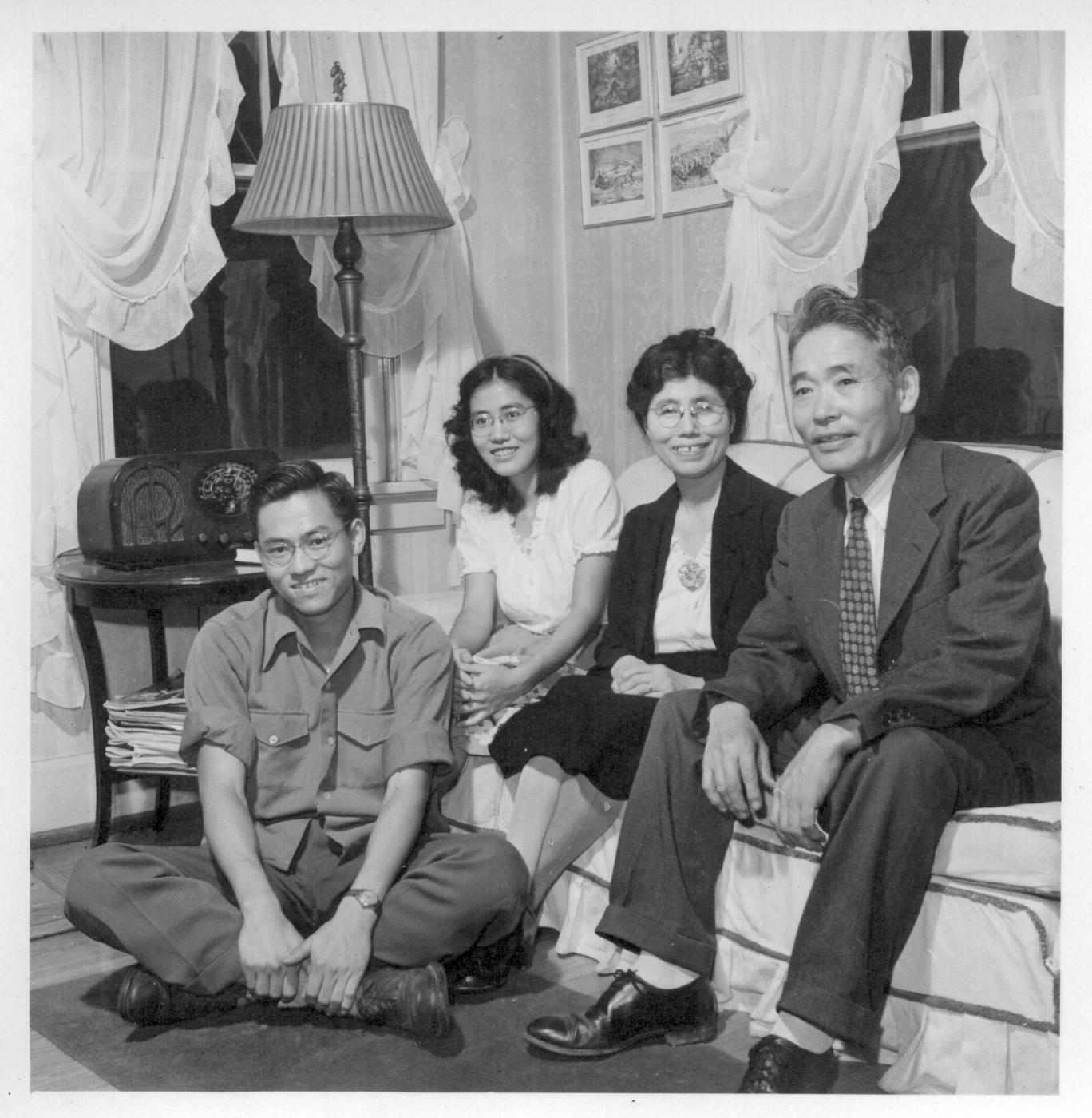
Professor Obata and family in 1944; (L–R):Gyo, Lily, Haruko, Prof. Obata.

Obata and his wife Haruko ran an art supply store at 2525 Telegraph Avenue in Berkeley, from which his wife offered lessons in ikebana. The shop was shot at after the Pearl Harbor attack in December 1941, and eventually the Obatas were forced to close it and cancel all classes.

Executive Order 9066 led to Obata organizing a large sale of his many paintings and woodblock prints. He donated the profits from the sale to establish a scholarship for a student "regardless of race or creed, who ... has suffered the most from this war." University President Robert Gordon Sproul, a friend of the Obatas, offered to store many of the remaining works. In April 1942, Obata was interned at the Tanforan detention center. By May, he and fellow artists, including George Matsusaburo Hibi and Mine Okubo, were able to create an art school that had 600 students, entirely with their own money and with donations from the outside from friends from U.C. Berkeley, including Dorothea Lange. Their curriculum was comprehensive, offering 95 classes each week in 25 subjects. Camp administrators were supportive, seeing art as a constructive way to occupy detainees' time, and Obata and his colleagues were eventually allowed to order supplies from Sears Roebuck catalogs or purchase them in town. The school became so successful that they were able to exhibit the artwork outside the camp in July.

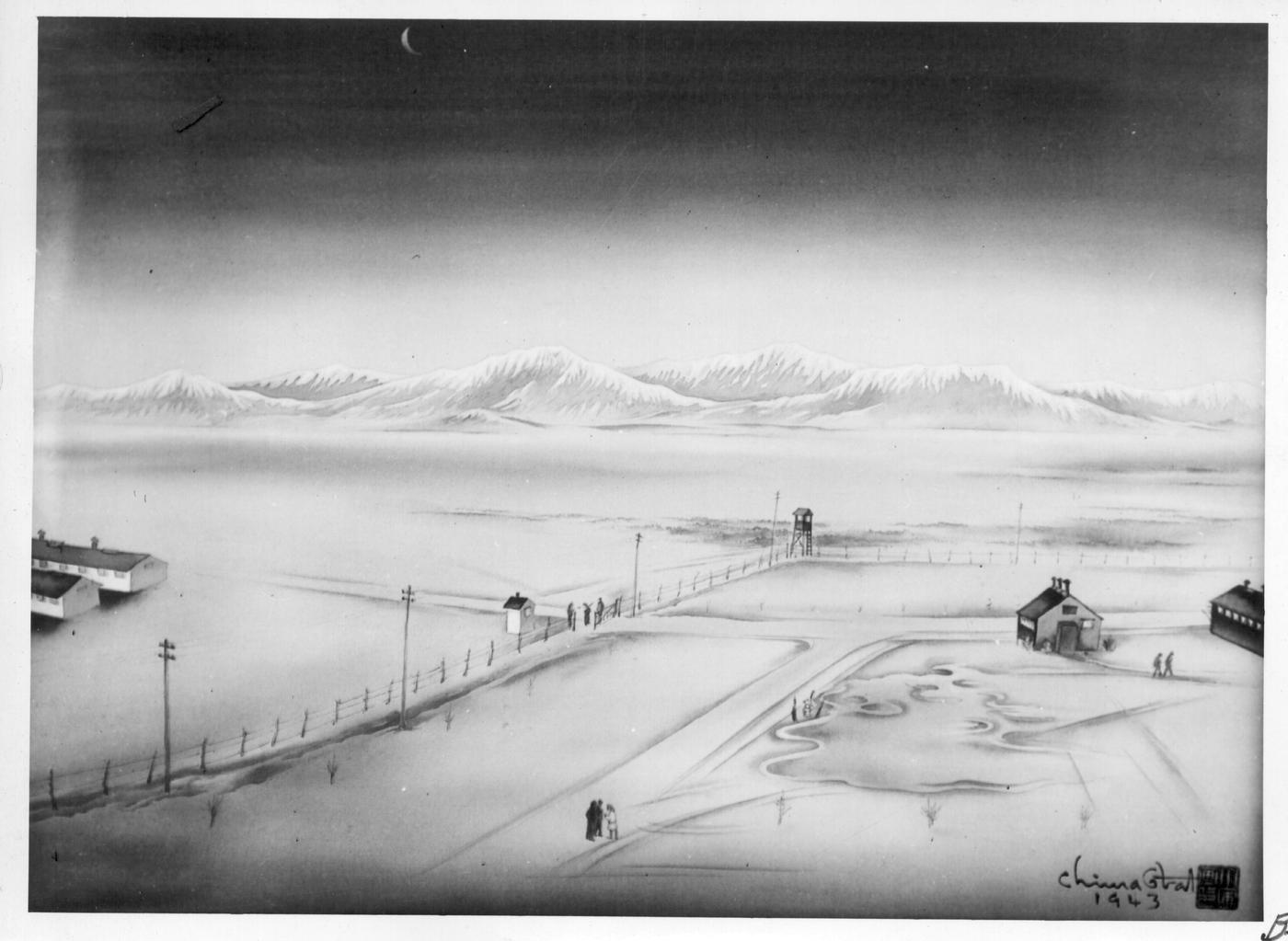
Obata's New Moon, painted at Topaz and exhibited in Cambridge, Massachusetts in 1943.

In September 1942, Obata was moved to the Topaz War Relocation Center in Topaz, Utah. There Obata was the founder and Director of The Topaz Art School, which had 16 artist/instructors who taught 23 subjects to over 600 students. During his internment, Obata made about one hundred sketches, paintings, and prints, using whatever materials were available—even making relief prints on surplus linoleum.

As director of the art school, Obata had worked closely with the intern camp administration. In the spring of 1943 tensions ran high at the camp, because of the signing of controversial loyalty oaths. Obata, who had been deemed 'loyal' and granted the privileges of leaving camp to teach classes at nearby universities and churches, was assaulted one night leaving the showers by a fellow inmate who considered him a spy. (Obata would later remark that he pitied his attacker for engaging in such violence that "will not better his life.") After two weeks' recovery in the camp hospital, he was immediately released from camp for his own safety. Obata moved with his family to St. Louis, Missouri, where Gyo, one of his sons, was going to architecture school. Obata found employment there with a commercial art company.

When Chiura Obata painted New Moon Over Topaz, Utah, he was a prisoner at the camp: one of 120,000 Japanese Americans to be incarcerated during World War II. The painting shows a dreamy moonlit desert, with just a few dark lines to hint at the barbed wire fences and guard towers that held him and his family captive. As a painter, Obata turned again and again to Nature as his greatest teacher, and his greatest subject. Today, his work can be found in art collections and museums around the world, including the Smithsonian American Art Museum.

== Post-war career ==
In 1945, when the military exclusion ban was lifted, Obata was reinstated as an instructor at UC Berkeley. In 1949 he was promoted to associate professor of art. In 1950, he and his wife moved out of the attic apartment of a friend, purchasing a house in the Elmwood district in Berkeley, where they had lived before the war.

His one-man shows continued, as did his sketching and painting trips in the high country, often with the Sierra Club. In 1953 he retired as professor emeritus from UC Berkeley. In 1954 he became a naturalized citizen.

Obata played a pivotal role in introducing Japanese art techniques and aesthetics to other artists in California. These techniques and aesthetics became one of the distinctive characteristics of the California Watercolor School.

== After retirement ==
In 1954, Chiura and Haruko Obata led the first of the "Obata Tours" to Japan, to see Japanese gardens and Japanese art. From 1955 to 1970, Obata traveled throughout California, giving lectures and demonstrations on Japanese brush painting, and leading tours. In 1965 he received the Order of the Sacred Treasure, 5th Class, Emperor's Award, for promoting good will and cultural understanding between the United States and Japan. He died in 1975, aged 89.

Posthumous exhibitions of Obata's works have been organized at the Oakland Museum, The Smithsonian Institution, and, in 2000, at the M. H. de Young Memorial Museum in San Francisco, a retrospective of 100 ink and brush paintings, large scrolls and color woodblock prints. In 2007 there was an exhibit in Yosemite National Park. The museum collection at Yosemite National Park contains several Obata prints of the park. The Smithsonian American Art Museum organized an exhibition of Obata's Yosemite woodblock prints, which was shown at the American Art Museum in Washington, DC in early 2008 and then traveled to the Wichita Falls Museum, Wichita, TX (2008) and Federal Hall National Memorial, National Park Service, in New York, NY (2009).

In Topaz Moon: Chiura Obata's Art of the Internment, Hill, who's become the Obata family historian, writes about, and includes art and letters Obata created as he kept record of his and other Japanese Americans’ ordeal. Even in the harsh climate and conditions at Topaz, he looked across the wide Sevier Desert to Topaz Mountain and later noted: “If I hadn't gone to that kind of place I wouldn't have realized the beauty that exists in that enormous bleakness.”

== Personal life ==
In 1912, Obata married Haruko Kohashi (1892–1989). She was one of the first teachers of ikebana in the San Francisco Bay Area. She had an exhibition of her arrangements in 1913 at San Francisco's 75th Diamond Jubilee Celebration, and in 1915 she exhibited at the Panama Pacific Exposition, beginning a career as a teacher of that art. Their first child, a daughter, was named Fujiko. Their second child, a son, was named Kim; the third, also a son, was named Gyo. Their last was a daughter, Yuri. Haruko's last public demonstration was in Golden Gate Park when she was 93 years old.

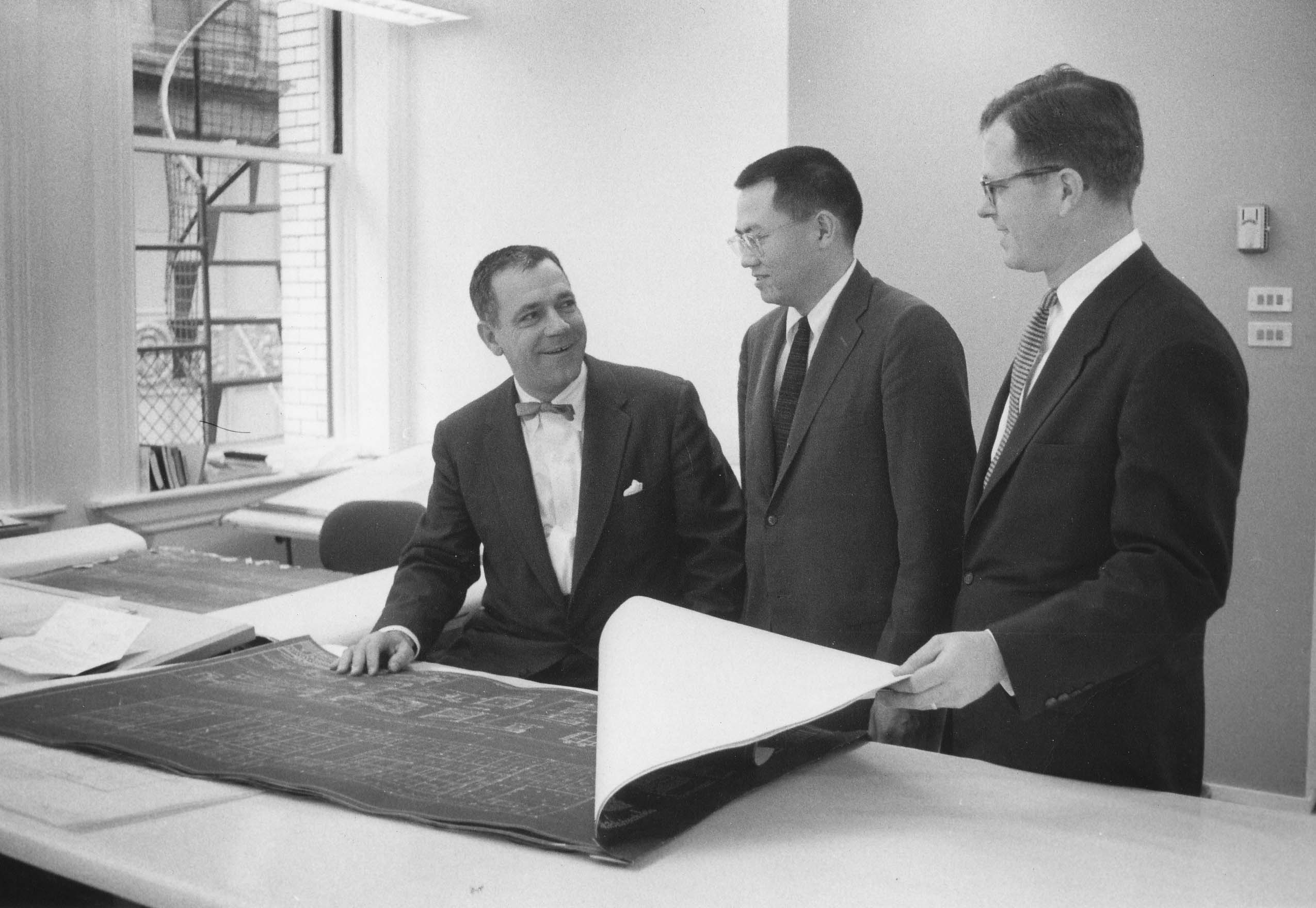
George Hellmuth, Gyo Obata and George Kassabaum in the Welek Fabrics Building on 315 N. 10th St. in St. Louis (1956).

=== Notable offspring ===
Their son Gyo Obata became one of the founding partners of the global architecture-engineering giant HOK, responsible for the Apple campus in Cupertino, California, American Airlines Arena in Miami, MetLife Stadium in East Rutherford, New Jersey, and the BBC's 2013 headquarters.

== Exhibitions ==
June 26 – October 17, 1999: Great Nature: The Transcendent Landscapes of Chiura Obata, Fine Arts Museums of San Francisco.

October 25, 2008 – January 18, 2009: Asian | American | Modern Art: Shifting Currents, 1900–1970. de Young Museum, San Francisco.

January 13 – April 29, 2018: Chiura Obata: An American Modern, Art, Design and Architecture Museum, UC Santa Barbara.

May 25 – September 2, 2018: Chiura Obata: An American Modern, Utah Museum of Fine Arts, Salt Lake City.

November 27, 2019 – May 25, 2020: Chiura Obata: American Modern, Smithsonian American Art Museum, Washington, D.C.

== Memorial highway ==
In 2020, the California legislature designated a section of California State Route 120 in Mono County as the "Chiura Obata Great Nature Memorial Highway". This section of the highway begins near the Tioga Pass Entrance Station at the elevation of 9,943 feet on the eastern boundary of Yosemite National Park and runs east through rugged mountain terrain toward Lee Vining, California. Signs designating the memorial highway were installed in 2021.
