= List of newspapers in Utah =

This is a list of newspapers in Utah

== Major daily ==
Name	City	Print circulation Weekday	Digital circulation Weekday	Ownership
The Salt Lake Tribune	Salt Lake City	74,043 (2015)		Huntsman Family Investments, LLC
Deseret News	Salt Lake City	40,719 (2014)	98,382 (2014)	The Church of Jesus Christ of Latter-day Saints
Standard-Examiner	Ogden	22,000		Ogden Newspapers
Daily Herald	Provo	32,000		Ogden Newspapers
The Herald Journal	Logan	16,215		Adams Publishing Group

== Regional and local ==
- Basin Nickel Ads — Vernal
- The Beaver Press — Beaver
- Box Elder News Journal — Brigham City
- Canyon Country Zephyr — Moab
- Cedar City Review — Cedar City
- The City Journals — Sandy County
- Davis County Clipper — Bountiful
- Emery County Progress — Castle Dale
- Hilltop Times — Hill Air Force Base
- Intermountain Catholic — Salt Lake City
- Iron County Today — Cedar City
- The Leader (Utah) — Tremonton
- Lehi Free Press — Lehi
- Magna Times — Magna
- Millard County Chronicle Progress — Delta
- The Times-Independent — Moab
- The Morgan County News — Morgan
- Park Record — Park City
- The Payson Chronicle — Payson
- Providence Citizen — Providence
- The Pyramid — Mount Pleasant
- QSaltLake — Salt Lake City
- The Richfield Reaper — Richfield
- Salt Lake City Weekly — Salt Lake City
- San Juan Record — Monticello
- Sanpete Messenger — Manti
- Serve Daily — Springville
- Smithfield Sun — Smithfield
- Southern Utah News — Kanab
- The Spectrum — St. George
- Sun Advocate — Price
- The Times-News — Nephi
- Tooele Transcript-Bulletin — Tooele
- Uintah Basin Standard — Roosevelt
- Vernal Express — Vernal
- Wasatch Wave — Heber City
- Wendover Times — Wendover

== College ==
- The Daily Universe — Brigham Young University
- The Daily Utah Chronicle — University of Utah
- The Forum — Westminster University
- The Globe — Salt Lake Community College
- UVU Review — Utah Valley University
- The Signpost — Weber State University
- The Snowdrift — Snow College
- SUU News — Southern Utah University
- Sun News — Utah Tech University
- The Utah Statesman — Utah State University

== Defunct ==
- The Broad Ax (Salt Lake City) (1895-19??)
- Goodwin's Weekly (Salt Lake City) (1902–1929)
- The Green Sheet (Castle Dale) (1891– early 2000s)
- Intermountain Catholic (Salt Lake City) (1899–1920)
- Iron County Record (Cedar City) (1893–1982)
- Salt Lake Daily Herald (Major daily newspaper, 1870–1909)
- Salt Lake Telegram (1915–1952)
- Topaz Times (1942–1945)
- Truth (Salt Lake City) (1901–1908)
- The Utah Independent — Salt Lake City (Conservative political newspaper, 1970–1977)

== See also ==
- List of LGBT periodicals in Utah
- List of Salt Lake City media
- List of television stations in Utah
- List of radio stations in Utah
- List of Latter Day Saint periodicals

Comprehensive

- Lists of newspapers
- List of newspapers in the United States

Frequency

- List of free daily newspapers in the United States
- List of weekly newspapers in the United States

Circulation

- List of international newspapers originating in the United States
- List of national newspapers in the United States
- List of newspapers in the United States by circulation

Foreign language

- List of French-language newspapers published in the United States
- List of German-language newspapers published in the United States
- List of Spanish-language newspapers published in the United States

Specialty

- List of African-American newspapers in the United States
- List of alternative weekly newspapers in the United States
- List of business newspapers in the United States
- List of family-owned newspapers in the United States
- List of Jewish newspapers in the United States
- List of LGBTQ periodicals in the United States
- List of student newspapers in the United States
- List of supermarket tabloids in the United States
- List of underground press in the United States

Other

- List of defunct newspapers of the United States
