= Ralph G. Martin =

American historian

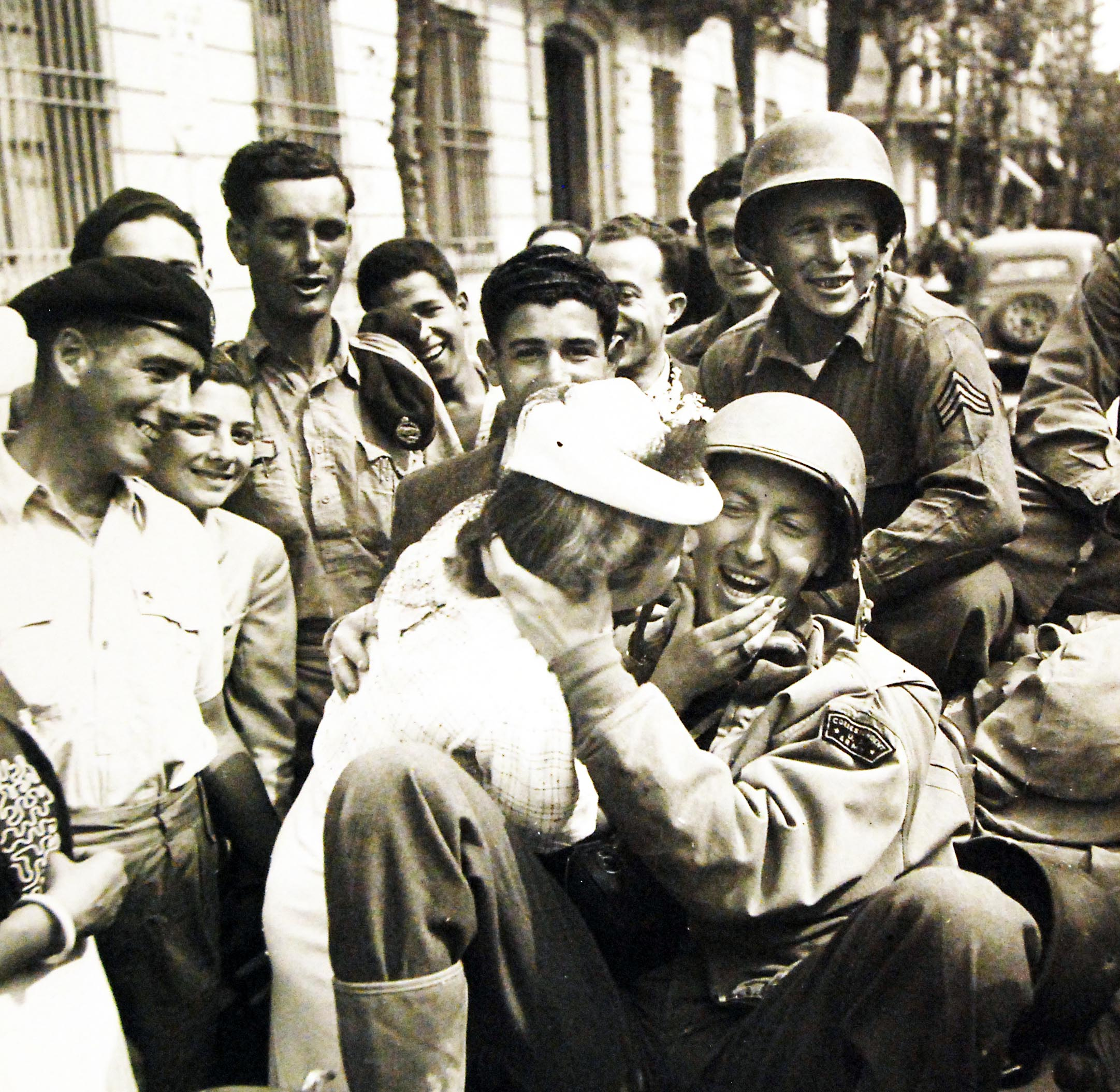
- Martin being kissed at Porto Farina during the Battle of Tunisia
- Born: Ralph Martin Goldberg; March 4, 1920; Chicago, Illinois, U.S.
- Died: January 9, 2013 (aged 92); Sleepy Hollow, New York, U.S.
- Education: University of Missouri (BA)
- Occupations: Writer, journalist, biographer, historian
- Spouse: Marjorie Pastel (1944-2013) (his death)
- Children: 3, with Pastel

Ralph G. Martin (March 4, 1920 – January 9, 2013) was an American journalist who authored or co-authored about thirty books, including popular biographies of recent historical figures, among which, Jennie, a two-volume (1969 and 1971) study of Winston Churchill's American mother, Lady Randolph Churchill, became the most prominent bestseller. Other successful tomes focused on British royal romance (Edward VIII and Wallis Simpson in 1974, as well as Prince Charles and Lady Diana in 1985) and on the Kennedy family (John F. Kennedy in 1983 and Joseph P. Kennedy in 1995).

== Early life and education ==
Born in Chicago, Ralph Martin Goldberg was eight years old when his family moved to Brooklyn, and started using the name Ralph G. Martin at an early age. He studied at City College of New York before earning a bachelor's degree in journalism from the University of Missouri in 1941.

== Career ==
Twenty-one years old upon receiving his diploma, he decided to hitchhike and found a newspaper job at Box Elder News Journal which served Brigham City, the county seat of Utah's Box Elder County. In December, following declaration of war in the aftermath of attack on Pearl Harbor, Martin enlisted in the Army and spent the war as a combat correspondent for the Armed Forces newspaper Stars and Stripes and the Army weekly magazine, Yank. In 1944, having interviewed New York City's mayor, Fiorello La Guardia, for Yank, Martin asked La Guardia to perform his marriage ceremony to Marjorie Pastel.

Returning to civilian life in 1945, Martin began working as editor for news and analysis publications Newsweek and The New Republic and became executive editor at decorating and domestic arts magazine House Beautiful. During the months preceding the 1952 and 1956 presidential elections, he served as a member of the campaign staff for the Democratic nominee, Adlai Stevenson.

Upon publication of Seeds of Destruction: Joe Kennedy and His Sons, he was invited for an hour-long conversation with Charlie Rose, broadcast December 8, 1995 on Rose's long-running TV interview program. A clip from the conversation was included on Rose's 2013 year-end show in memoriam of 35 guests who died that year and had been interviewed on his programs broadcast between 1991 and 2009.

== Personal life ==
Having lived for years in the Connecticut town of Westport, near New York City, Martin moved to the Kendal-on-Hudson retirement community in Sleepy Hollow, New York, where he died at age 92. He and his wife Marjorie had three children.

== Selected bibliography ==
- Skin Deep. 1960.
- (with Richard Harrity) World War II. A Photographic Record of the War in Europe. From D-Day to V-E Day. 1962
- Ballots & Bandwagons. 1964.
- World War II: A Photographic Record of the War in the Pacific. From Pearl Harbor to V-J Day. 1965
- The Bosses (Mark Hanna, Ed Crump, Frank Hague, James Michael Curley, Jordan Chambers, John Moran Bailey and others). 1964.
- The GI War. 1967.
- A Man for All People: Hubert H. Humphrey (illustrated biography for the Democratic candidate's 1968 presidential campaign). 1968.
- Jennie: The Life of Lady Randolph Churchill, The Romantic Years, 1854–1895. 1969.
- Jennie: The Life of Lady Randolph Churchill, The Dramatic Years, 1895–1921. 1971.
- Lincoln Center for the Performing Arts. 1971.
- President from Missouri: Harry S. Truman. 1973.
- The Woman He Loved (Edward VIII and Wallis Simpson). 1974.
- Cissy (Cissy Patterson). 1979.
- A Hero for Our Time: An Intimate Story of the Kennedy Years (John F. Kennedy). 1983.
- Charles & Diana (Prince Charles and Lady Diana). 1985.
- Golda: Golda Meir, the Romantic Years. 1988.
- Henry and Clare: An Intimate Portrait of the Luces (Henry Luce and Clare Boothe Luce). 1991.
- Seeds of Destruction: Joe Kennedy and His Sons (Joseph P. Kennedy). 1995.
