= Homei Iseyama =

American artist

- Born: 1890; Japan
- Died: 1975 (aged 84–85); Oakland, California

Homei Iseyama (1890–1975) was an American artist known for slate carvings.

Iseyama was born in Japan in 1890. He attended Waseda University in Tokyo before emigrating to the United States in 1914. He pursued a career as landscape gardener in Oakland, California. During World War II, after the signing of Executive Order 9066, Iseyama was interned in the Topaz War Relocation Center in Utah. While he was interned he created objects such as teapots, inkwells, and bowls from slate he found around the relocation camp. Iseyama was also a bonsai master. He died in 1975 in Oakland.

Iseyama's work was included in the traveling exhibition The Art of Gaman. The exhibition toured the United States and Japan from 2006 through 2015, starting at the Museum of Craft and Folk Art in San Francisco and ending at the Houston Holocaust Museum.

His work, Teapot and Cup, was acquired by the Smithsonian American Art Museum as part of the Renwick Gallery's 50th Anniversary Campaign.
