= The Spectrum (Utah) =

Newspaper in St. George, Utah

- Type: Daily newspaper
- Owner: USA Today Co.
- Founder: Errol G. Brown
- Editor: Zach Hillstrom
- Founded: 1963 (as the Southern Utah News-Advertiser)
- Language: English
- Headquarters: 335 E. St. George Blvd, St. George, UT 84770
- Website: thespectrum.com

The Spectrum is a daily newspaper based in St. George, Utah.

== History ==
In 1963, Errol G. Brown, owner of the Southern Utah News in Kanab, founded the Southern Utah News-Advertiser. It was a freely distributed weekly newspaper with 10,000 copies sent out residents in five counties. After a few months, he set up an office and printing plant in Hurricane.

Over time it became too difficult for Brown to operate two publications 700 miles apart, so in March 1965 he sold his Hurricane paper, with an agreement for the new owners to change the name to the Tri-State News-Advertiser. The paper was soon sold again, moved to La Verkin, and renamed to the Southern Utah Free Press. In 1971, Brown resumed management of the paper. He moved the business to St. George and renamed the paper again to the South Utah Press-Advertiser.

In December 1972, Brown sold the paper to R. Gail Stahle, who renamed it to the Color County Spectrum. Stahle expanded it from a weekly into a daily starting March 24, 1976. The name was changed to The Daily Spectrum in 1982. Toronto-based Thomson Corporation purchased paper in 1984. The name was changed to The Spectrum in 1994. Thomson sold the paper to Gannett in 2000. Brown died in 2021. Stahle died in 2024.
