= George Ishiyama =

Japanese-American businessman (1914–2003)

George Shigeru Ishiyama (Japanese: 石山 茂, February 22, 1914 – February 4, 2003) was a Japanese-American businessman who was president of Alaska Pulp Corporation (APC) in Sitka, Alaska between 1983 and 2003.

== Early life and education ==
Ishiyama was born and raised in Los Angeles, California, and completed a bachelor's degree in economics from the University of California at Los Angeles in 1936.

== Career ==
He and his family were interned during World War II at camps in Utah and Wyoming following the signing of Executive Order 9066. However, because Ishiyama determined ways to improve camps operations he was assigned to work in Washington, D.C., with the Department of Interior which had charge of the camps.

After the war, Ishiyama traveled to Japan to assist in its rebuilding, and to assist in mutual understanding between the United States and Japan. This became a constant theme of his life.

Ishiyama first established himself as a businessman in Japan, and in 1960, he arranged for the sale of liquefied natural gas from the Phillips/Marathon plant on the Kenai Peninsula to Japan. This contract enabled the plant to be built. In the 1970s, Ishiyama was a key leader in reclaiming and developing Tokyo Bay.

In 1976, Ishiyama arranged for a high level trade mission to Alaska headed up by Toshio Doko, then the head of Japan's most powerful business group, the Keidenren.

In 1982, Ishiyama took the lead in attempting to arrange for the export of Alaska oil to Japan.

In 1983, Ishiyama became President of Alaska Pulp Corporation.

== Awards ==
In 1991, Ishiyama was awarded a Medal of Honor for his contributions to the promotion of mutual understanding and business relationships between Japan, by Japan's Ministry of International Trade and Industry.

== Legacy ==
- In honor of his contributions to the City of Wrangell, a street was named after him.
- On February 22, 2003, Alaskan Governor Frank Murkowski announced the creation of a state holiday (George Ishiyama Day)
