= Chizu Iiyama =

Japanese-American activist and educator

- Born: Chizu Kitano; 14 November 1921
- Died: 26 August 2020 (aged 98)
- Occupation: Activist, social worker, teacher

Chizu Iiyama (November 14, 1921 – August 26, 2020) was a Japanese American activist, social worker, and educator active in the Redress Movement, desegregation in Chicago, and other causes. She is best known for her contributions to the Japanese American Redress Movement, which sought to obtain reparations and a formal apology from the United States government for the internment of Japanese Americans during World War II.

== Early life ==
Iiyama (née Kitano) was born in San Francisco on November 14, 1921. The fifth daughter of seven children, she is reported to have felt that her family were disappointed at having another daughter. Her family operated a boarding house for Japanese American and African American laborers in San Francisco's Chinatown. Iiyama enrolled at University of California, Berkeley in 1938 as a psychology major, paying her way by working as a "schoolgirl" (a servant in a private home). She became active in campus organizations such as "Fair Bear Labor Standards," an organization to ensure students working on campus had fair working conditions.

Immediately after the December 7, 1941 attack on Pearl Harbor, the FBI began arresting Japanese Americans—primarily Issei (first generation Japanese immigrant) men—who had been black-listed because of their status as community leaders or perceived connections to Japan. Iiyama's father, an active member of the local Japanese Association, was among those arrested, leaving her sisters to run the family's boarding house in his absence.

Following the authorization of Japanese American incarceration under Executive Order 9066, the Kitano family was forcibly removed to the Santa Anita Assembly Center in April 1942. Iiyama worked as the "Education and Recreation Supervisor," creating youth programs such as art, music, sports, boy scouts, dances. She received her degree from UC Berkeley by mail in May 1942.

The family was subsequently transferred to Topaz concentration camp in Utah, where Iiyama became a block social worker and met her future husband, Ernest Iiyama. Ernest introduced her to a group of inmates formerly known as the "Nisei Young Democrats," a radical organization of Japanese Americans active in the Bay Area prior to the forced removal.

== Postwar life and activism ==
After obtaining early release from Topaz, the Iiyamas moved to New York, where they started a dry cleaning company and joined the American Labor Party and the Japanese American Committee for Democracy. Iiyama started giving talks about her camp experience, which was rare at a time when most survivors were still reluctant to speak openly about this history.

Chizu and Ernest moved to Chicago in 1948 and founded a chapter of the Nisei Progressives, a group that supports movements for equality, justice, and peace. Iiyama also served as assistant director for the Chicago Resettlers Committee, which provided support in securing jobs and housing for Japanese Americans relocating to Chicago after leaving the camps.

In the meantime, Iiyama obtained a master's degree in child development from the University of Chicago and became involved with local civil rights issues like job discrimination against African Americans, the nuclear disarmament movement, and the desegregation of beaches and other public facilities. They returned to the Bay Area in 1955.

In 1970, Iiyama moved to El Cerrito where she served as the chair of the Human Rights Commission.

Iiyama was on the advisory board of the program 'Here in America? The Assembly on Wartime Relocation & Internment of Civilians'
