= Sun Advocate =

American bi-weekly newspaper

- Type: Biweekly newspaper
- Owner: Emery Telcom
- Founded: 1891
- Language: English
- Headquarters: 625 East 100 North; Price, UT 84501
- OCLC number: 13039549
- Website: etvnews.com/tag/sun-advocate/

The Sun Advocate was a bi-weekly newspaper located in Price, Utah, United States. Emery Telcom has owned the paper since October, 2018 and is published as ETV News Sun Advocate.

== History ==
The newspaper was the successor to a number of older publications. In January 1891, the Eastern Utah Telegraph was established. In February 1885, the Telegraph was sold to S.H. Brownlee and renamed to the Eastern Utah Advocate. In 1889, Robert W. Crockett, who previously worked at the Salt Lake Herald and Aspen Times, bought the Advocate. In May 1907, the Carbon County News was founded in Price under the business management of J.H. Nelson. The company was incorporated with Frank F. Fisk as president and B.R. McDonald as vice president. That June, editor Carl L. Williams took charge of the News, but he left later that year.

In July 1913, Crockett sold the Advocate to Fred L. Watrous, but foreclosed on the mortgage in May 1915. A few weeks prior, Watrous had sold the business to B.R. McDonald. A judge ruled the mortgage only included the printing plant, which went into the receivership of Carl R. Marcusen. The name rights and subscriber list were transferred to McDonald. That June, Crockett used the plant to start a new paper called the Price Sun.

In July 1915, McDonald bought the Carbon County News from W.C. Benfer and merged it with the Advocate to form the News-Advocate. Benfer stayed on as manager. Also in July, Crockett bought the defunct Advocate plant from the sheriff's auction. Throughout this time, both rival papers were sent to the same subscribers, with each urging customers not to pay for the other. In December 1915, Harry Wilbert Cooper took charge of the News-Advocate and published it until his death in 1923. His widow Mrs. Grace A. Cooper then published the paper. In June 1929, she sold it to William T. Igleheart. In January 1932, P.K. Nielson bought the News-Advocate at sheriff's auction.

In December 1932, Joseph L. Asbury, owner of The Richfield Reaper, bought the Price Sun from Crockett and the News-Advocate from Nielson. He merged them to form the Sun Advocate. In 1934, Ashby sold the Reaper. In 1935, Asbury sold his Price paper to Hal G. MacKnight and Val H. Cowles. In 1937, the two bought the Helper Journal and appointed Clifton N. Memmott as manager. In 1938 Cowles, a World War I veteran, was elected to serve in the Utah State Senate and would continue to do so for 9 years. In 1941, Cowles sold his interest in the Journal to Memmott. In 1942, MacKnight sold his Journal stake to Joe Tullius.

In 1948, L. Earl Durrant became Sun Advocate co-owner with McKnight. In 1950, Tullius bought out Memmott from the Journal. In 1966, MacKnight sold the Sun Advocate to an ownership group led by Robert L. Finney and included Robert Cribb, who then in 1973 bought the Journal from Tullius. In 1975, Finney acquired the Emery County Progress. In 1976, the Journal was merged with the Saturday edition of the Sun Advocate and renamed to the Sun Journal.

In 1981, Communications Investment Corp., acquired the Sun Advocate and Progress. The company was owned by George C. Hatch and Wilda Gene Hatch, owners of the Ogden Standard-Examiner. In 1989, Hometown Communication acquired the Sun Advocate and the Progress. In 1996, Brehm Communications of San Diego purchased both papers. In 2018, Emery Telcom bought the Advocate and Progress from Brehm.
