= Koho Yamamoto =

Japanese artist (born 1922)

- Born: April 14, 1922 (age 104); Alviso, California, U.S.

Koho Yamamoto (born April 14, 1922) is an American artist known for her artistry in Sumi-e, a style of Japanese brushwork using black ink. She is also a poet, calligrapher, and a teacher. She uses her experiences from the American concentration camps to create beautiful abstract art. “My painting comes from nothingness and has right to it,” Koho states in an interview. One of her most memorable experiences was meeting her teacher in one of the concentration camps.

== Early life ==
Masako Yamamoto was born in Alviso, California, on April 14, 1922. Her mother had been a school teacher in Japan. After leaving her mother had been diagnosed with cancer, dying when Koho was just four. She spent her early elementary school years in Japan and returned permanently to live in the United States in 1931 when she was nine years old. Her father, Wataro Yamamoto, was a poet and a calligrapher. While Koho Yamamoto and her siblings were in Japan, her father stayed in California. He owned a restaurant in San Jose, and financially supported his family from there. In 1951, she married an artist named Hideo Kobashigawa who had also been imprisoned at Tule Lake. She met him at Taro Yashima's Studio around 1947. While married to him, she took his last name Kobashigawa. After she moved to New York, the couple possibly was separated.

== Internment Camps ==
In World War II, as a result of widespread anti-Japanese hostility and the issuance of Executive Order 9066 by then President Franklin D. Roosevelt, she and her father and siblings were forcibly imprisoned in three different internment camps, places of detainment established by the federal government for people of Japanese ancestry living on the west coast of the United States. They moved from the Tanforan Assembly Center in California to the Topaz War Relocation Center in Utah and then back again to California where they were last incarcerated at the Tule Lake Segregation Center.

== Education ==
In 1942, while confined at Topaz, Yamamoto studied with the renowned artist and University of California, Berkeley professor, Chiura Obata and became his apprentice. Like Yamamoto, Obata's family was displaced after the bombing of Pearl Harbor and forced to move to a camp. Obata started a school at the prison and it was there that he taught Koho and gave her her artist's name which means “Red Harbor.” His gesture was also recognized as a symbol of spiritual succession. In 1946 she studies at the Art Students League. She then went on to win the Allen tucker scholarship, where she studied with Richard Bove who taught her about oil painting. At Taro Yashima's studio in 1947, she was a member of the artist's group.

== Career ==
After the war, Yamamoto moved to Manhattan and studied at the Art Students League of New York. During this period, an art critic gave accolades to her work as fantastic dark landscapes. Isamu Noguchi also complimented her pieces, I find your paintings to be exceptionally beautiful.

She also said in relation to her passion with painting, “Just become one with your painting and don’t think about other things. Just become what you are painting. Just dive into it. Don’t think about it too much. And be bold. You can’t be scared. You have to make mistakes.”

She studied Sumi-e with Berkeley Art Professor Chiura Obata in the Topaz Relocation Center in Millard Co., UT. The professor gave her the artistic name “Koho.”

She joined Gallery 84 in 1955. This was an original in the 10th street cooperative gallery. In 1958 she moved to 24 Cornelia ST. in New York City, where she made ends meet by holding a variety of jobs, all while continuing to pursue her passion with studying art.

In 1973, she founded the Koho School of Sumi-e on the corner of Macdougal and Houston Streets in New York City where she taught traditional Japanese ink painting techniques. In 1977, she exhibited at the Educational Alliance Art School. In 1989, her paintings were displayed with those of other internees and noted artists like Henry Sugimoto and Miné Okubo at a show in Hastings-on-Hudson that recounted the persecution of Japanese-Americans after World War II. Throughout her lifetime, Koho Yamamoto had her work exhibited 15 times.

She also designed covers for novels done by Yukio Mishima which was exhibited in Peking, Shanghai and Canton in China. This was sponsored by Iron Flower Chan Art School, Honolulu. Although her school closed in 2010, she still produced artworks. In 2021, she exhibited 10 abstract paintings at the Isamu Noguchi Foundation and Garden Museum in a show called Koho Yamamoto: Under a Dark Moon. She has exhibited at the Leonovich Gallery in New York and one of her paintings is in the collection of the Smithsonian's National Museum of American History.

She also notably taught at Columbia University, New York University, Parsons School of Design, the Japanese American Society and the Nippon Museum.

She modeled for a Frank Debourge designer clothing line at the age of 96.

Yamamoto recently celebrated her 101st birthday and has been profiled on numerous occasions in the New York Times. She continues to paint and teach. To start, all her students must paint bamboo. “I tell them to make their minds into nothingness,” she said.

On her 101st birthday she had an exhibition called “Koho Yamamoto: 101 Springs” displaying 17 of her Sumi-e paintings she made with traditional materials from Japan such as sumo ink, and rice paper. The style she used is called notan, and is the balance of the light and dark tones. The exhibition opens April 14 in the Leonovich Gallery in New York.

Her work can be found on the Art SY and The White Hot Magazine as well.

Many of her works were both undated, and untitled but this description from Jonathan Goodman on one of her pieces at Leonovich Gallery illustrates her style. “Yamamoto presents a work done entirely with ink on paper. It is a marvelous compilation of streaks and blots and line–a kind of abstract landscape. Two verticals, a thin line on the left and a thicker line on the right, with a few blots running up the line, begin with a tighter space between them at the bottom of the composition. But then, the lines widen, their gap increasing as they rise. Between them, close to the top are a small group of black orbs, while the background is mostly taken over by several horizontal washes of diluted ink. This piece like most in the show is characterized by an evident joy, making it emotionally memorable.”
