= Patrick Hayashi =

Japanese American civil rights activist and academic

Patrick "Pat" Hayashi
- Born: January 10, 1944 (age 82); Topaz Incarceration Camp
- Occupations: Retired Associate Vice President of the University of California system, Japanese American civil rights activist, Asian American community leader, and artist.

Patrick "Pat" Hayashi (January 10, 1944) is a Japanese American civil rights activist, Asian American community leader, academic, and academic administrator, and artist. Born Patrick Saburo Hayashi in the Topaz incarceration camp during World War II, Pat Hayashi began his career at the University of California, Berkeley in 1966 as a mail carrier, and in 1969, taught English 1A in the new Asian American Studies program. Hayashi later served as Associate President under President Dwight Atkinson, becoming the first highest ranking Asian American administrator in the University of California system. His work as an administrator and activist focused on transforming admission systems at University of California that disadvantaged marginalized populations.

== Biography ==
Hayashi attended grade school in Hayward, California enrolled in San Jose State University, and later transferred to the University of California, Berkeley.

He began his career as a mail carrier on the campus of UC Berkeley and went on to hold a range of positions, including faculty member and eventually chair of the Asian American Studies Department. He also served as an analyst and Special Assistant to the Chancellor.

In 1988, he was appointed as Associate Vice Chancellor of Admissions and Enrollment following controversy surrounding Asian American admissions. In 1986, after years of steady growth, Asian American enrollment declined, prompting accusations from the Asian American community that the university had engaged in discriminatory and unlawful admissions practices which limited Asian American enrollment. The issue drew public scrutiny, drawing both national and international attention from Der Spiegel, the Economist, and the Asianweek. The political pressure resulted in a public apology from then Chancellor Ira Michael Heyman.

Although community leaders accepted Heyman's apology, they pointed to the absence of Asian Americans in senior administrative roles. Hayashi's subsequent appointment was understood to be a response to these concerns response.

Hayashi served as associate president of the University of California under President Richard Atkinson from 1999 to 2004. During this period, Hayashi was active in calling for changes to the Scholastic Aptitude Test (SAT).

Upon retirement in 2004, Hayashi decided to take up art and became an accomplished artist. He was invited by the United States State Department to offer art lessons and lectures about Japanese incarceration in Kyrgyzstan.

In 2009, Hayashi gave a commencement speech at a University of California Nisei honorary degree ceremony recognizing Japanese American students affected by WWII incarceration.

As of 2014, Hayashi is a member of the Emeritus Board of Asian Pacific Americans in Higher Education (APAHE).

=== Early life ===
Although Hayashi has stated that he does not recall much from his time in the Topaz incarceration camp, he describes the experience as having a lasting impact on his life and identity.

Hayashi's mother, Aiko (also known as Alice) Hayashi, died of rheumatic heart failure when he was eleven. His father, Henry, attributed her declining health to the strains of incarceration. After his mother's death, his father became increasingly quiet and withdrawn, which Hayashi believes reflected feelings of grief and anger.

== Published works ==
- Hayashi, Patrick. "Honorary Degree Ceremony Remarks." The Great American Mosaic: An Exploration of Diversity in Primary Documents. Bloomsbury, 2014, pp. 307-309.
- Hayashi, Patrick. “The Merits of the National Merit Scholars Program: Questions and Concerns. Research & Occasional Paper Series: CSHE.6.05.” Center for Studies in Higher Education, 1 Mar. 2005.
- Hayashi, Patrick. "The college board's proposed 'essay' test was poorly conceived." The Chronicle of Higher Education, vol. 37, no. 23, 20 Feb. 1991, p. B2.

== Recognition ==
Hayashi was the 2024 recipient of Leadership Education for Asian Pacifics (LEAP) Award, which recognizes Asian and Pacific Islander leaders for cultural impact and community leadership.

== See also ==
- Internment of Japanese Americans
- University and college admission
