= Karl Ichiro Akiya =

Japanese-American activist and writer (1909–2001)

Karl Ichiro Akiya (カール・秋谷一郎; born Ichiro Akiya; 5 September 1909 – 8 February 2001) was a Japanese-American writer and activist for numerous political and social causes. A labor activist in both the United States and Japan, Akiya was also an intellectual figure in the Japanese-American community.

== Biography ==
Akiya was born in 1909 in San Francisco, California, to Protestant Christian Japanese immigrants. Akiya spent the early years of his life in Japan, where he was first sent to receive an education between the ages of 6 and 23 as a kibei. He graduated Kwansei Gakuin University, where he was inspired by Uchimura Junya (brother of Uchimura Kanzō), Jōtarō Kawakami (later chairman of the Japan Socialist Party), and Toyohiko Kagawa. Akiya became a proponent of both communism and democracy, becoming a labor activist and protesting against compulsory military service for university students. Politically conscious since his student years, the staunchly leftist Akiya immigrated to the United States out of opposition to Japanese militarism in the decades preceding World War II, renouncing his Japanese nationality in the 1930s.

Like Karl Yoneda, Akiya adopted the Western first name Karl to honor Karl Marx. During the early 1930s, Akiya met Dorothea Lange, Otto Hagel and Hansel Mieth at a protest against scrap metal from Japan. He grew close to Mieth, who stayed at the Akiya family-managed Ogawa Hotel in 1931. Shortly after, Akiya had to shut down the hotel amidst the Great Depression and after being unemployed for a year, he began working for the San Francisco branch of the Sumitomo Bank, who accepted him out of a hundred applicants because of his clean kanji calligraphy. Akiya is believed to have begun a romantic relationship with Mieth in 1933, after the death of Mieth's child with Hagel, which laster until 1936 or 1937. Akiya and Yoneda both took up work at Doho, a Japanese-language newspaper in San Francisco between 1941 and 1942. Both swore allegiance to the United States in opposition to Japanese fascism following the attack on Pearl Harbor. During World War II, following the signing of Executive Order 9066, he was incarcerated at Topaz War Relocation Center in Utah and later Manzanar in California. Akiya and Yoneda gained early release in exchange for providing interpreter services for military intelligence. Akiya taught Japanese to US Army soldiers at the University of Michigan. Both remained under observation by the Federal Bureau of Investigation during the Second Red Scare due to their continued communist leanings.

A member of the Japanese American Citizens League, the Communist Party USA, and the United Furniture Workers of America, Akiya wrote for a variety of both American and Japanese periodicals and contributed to the Hokubei Shimpo, a Japanese-language newspaper in the United States. His essays, fiction, and an autobiography were published in The New York Bungei, a Japanese-language magazine Akiya helped found in 1959. He remained employed at the Sumitomo Bank until 1980. In 1987, Akiya received the Martin Luther King Award of New York State.
