= Taneyuki Harada =

Japanese-American painter

Taneyuki “Dan” Harada (June 7, 1923 – December 9, 2020) was a Japanese-American painter and computer scientist who was incarcerated at Tanforan Assembly Center, Topaz War Relocation Center, Leupp Isolation Center, and Tule Lake Segregation Center during World War II. His paintings capture the experience of Japanese-Americans in concentration camp life, including the segregation, isolation, and discrimination they faced. He learned to paint at various art schools while detained, and continued studying at the California College of Arts and Crafts in Oakland, California, after being released at the end of the war. He was the recipient, in 1949, of the James D. Phelan Art Award, which was established to recognize the achievements of California-born artists across many disciplines. Today, pieces of his collections are held at the Fine Arts Museums of San Francisco, the Autry Museum of Western Heritage, and the Los Angeles County Museum of Art.

== Early life ==
Taneyuki “Dan” Harada was born on June 7, 1923 in the “Little Tokyo” sector of Los Angeles, California. In 1930, Harada’s father died of illness and he was sent to live with his paternal relatives in Japan. U.S. natural born citizens who were educated in Japan like Harada are referred to as kibei. In 1932, Harada’s brother also died of illness. He had become aware of increasing militarism in Japan before his mother remarried in 1938 and returned to Oakland, California, with her son and new husband.

== Executive Order 9066 ==
Following the December 7 attack on Pearl Harbor in 1941, Harada stopped attending school on account of bullying, and his step-father’s business was closed after the state revoked its license. On February 19, 1942, Executive Order 9066 was issued demanding the detainment and relocation of all Japanese and Japanese-American individuals. In the spring of 1942, Harada and his family were transferred to the Tanforan Assembly Center.

Harada remained detained at Tanforan through the summer of 1942, and it was there that he began painting, as a student of the Tanforan art school founded by Issei artists Chiura Obata and George Matsusaburo Hibi and Nisei artists Miné Okubo and Frank Taira. In September 1942, Harada and his family were relocated to the Topaz War Relocation Center in Utah, where he continued studying with Hibi as his mentor. One of his most famous works, "Barracks" (now held at the Fine Arts Museums of San Francisco) depicts an "enigmatic view of the camp, devoid of any of the nine thousand internees...(visualizing) both its physical isolation in the desert and the psychological alienation brought on through unjust detention"

In February 1943, the WRA (War Relocation Authority) distributed a "loyalty questionnaire" meant to assess the loyalty of Japanese and Japanese-American individuals. Question 27 asked if Nisei men were willing to enter active combat duty, and asked everyone else if they would serve in other ways (such as in the Women's Army Auxiliary Corps). Question 28 asked if individuals would renounce allegiance to the Emperor of Japan. Both questions caused confusion and unrest among those incarcerated. Japanese-American citizens felt resentment for being detained without due process and asked to renounce loyalty to a country they had no ties to, while also being asked to risk their lives in military service. Japanese immigrants were not legally allowed to become U.S. citizens due to racist guidelines, so renouncing their only form of legal citizenship would leave them stateless.

A form of resistance formed in response to the loyalty questionnaire, with the resistors being called the “no-no’s” for answering no to both questions 27 and 28. Harada belonged to that group, as did Harada’s stepfather, who requested repatriation to Japan.

In July 1943, as a consequence of his answers on the loyalty questionnaire, Harada was transferred to Leupp Isolation Center, where he continued to paint in isolated detention. In December, he was transferred to Tule Lake where he was initially held in a stockade with several hundred other people before joining the regular barracks. He continued studying at the center’s art school, and was said to have painted and hung a portrait of a 1940s movie star in his barrack. While at Tule Lake, Harada was commissioned by Dr. Marvin Opler (a community analyst) to paint his daughters and document camp life with a number of pen drawings, and in 1945, Harada held his first solo exhibition in the ironing room of block 5.

== End of the War ==
In 1944, the Renunciation Act of 1944 was passed, allowing for U.S.-born citizens to renounce their citizenship in times of war. Harada, on account of having given a “no-no” answer on the loyalty questionnaire and under the assumption that he and his family would be repatriated back to Japan at the end of the war, renounced his citizenship. “As far as I'm concerned, there seems to be no future in the United States,” Harada remarked on his feelings at the time, “you're not really thinking things through”. On March 17, 1946, over three years after initially being detained at the age of 18, Harada and his family were finally given permission to leave Tule Lake. Harada was now 22 years old. They went on to stay in temporary housing with other Japanese families in Richmond, California until relocating.

== After the war ==
Harada worked as a fruit picker and gardener while studying at the California College of Arts and Crafts in Oakland, California. He worked in commercial design and illustration, inspired by Ben Shahn, and held annual exhibitions at the Oakland Art Gallery, the San Francisco Museum of Art, and the California Palace of the Legion of Honor. He received the James D. Phelan Art Award in 1949, and the following year he held his first two solo exhibitions out of camp, after which he switched to computer programming for the federal government until returning to painting in retirement. With the help of attorney Wayne M. Collins, Harada had his citizenship restored in 1959. He was a featured artist in the 1998 "Arts After Incarceration" show by the Pro Arts Gallery in Oakland.

== End of Life ==
Harada stayed in Berkeley, California until his death on December 9, 2020. Pieces of his collections are held at the San Francisco Fine Art Museum, the Autry Museum of Western Heritage, and the Los Angeles County Museum of Art. Others have been auctioned off to private owners.
