= Topaz (1945 film) =

1945 documentary film

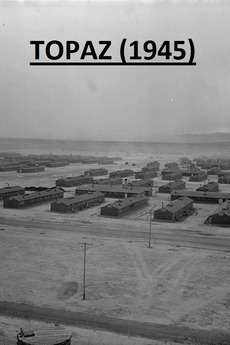
- Picture of Topaz internment camp
- Directed by: Dave Tatsuno
- Produced by: Dave Tatsuno
- Release date: May 23, 1945

Topaz is a 1945 documentary film, shot illegally by internee Dave Tatsuno (1913–2006), (though with the assistance of members of the camp staff), which documented life at the Topaz War Relocation Center in Utah during World War II. Tatsuno went through a unique and challenging filming process in order to produce his movie due to lack of freedom within the internment camps that hindered his ability to film his experiences.

The film was deemed "culturally significant" by the United States Library of Congress in 1996, and was the second amateur film ever selected for preservation in the National Film Registry (after the "Zapruder" film of the JFK assassination).

== Production ==
Between 1943 and 1945, Dave Tatsuno was incarcerated in a Japanese internment camp called Topaz War Relocation Center located in Millard County, Utah. During this time, he filmed his documentary with an 8mm home movie camera that he acquired in 1936. During WWII, cameras were considered contraband for Japanese Americans and were to be surrendered to the government. To avoid this confiscation, Tatsuno gave his camera to his friend claiming "you can't turn in something you don't have".

During his time at the camp, Tatsuno began to manage a dry goods co-op. Tatsuno always credited his store supervisor, Walter Honderick, for helping him get the movie camera into the camp. They arranged for the camera to be mailed to the supervisor to avoid inspection, and the supervisor gave Tatsuno the camera warning him, "I wouldn't get too closed to the [barbed wire] fence." Because of his role and previous experience in retail, Tatsuno was selected to do various merchandise runs, which allowed for him to travel outside of the camp and across the country. He estimates that he traveled 20,000 miles during his time doing these runs. It was during this supply trips that Tatsuno was able to purchase 8 mm color film for his camera, which he used to film his experience in the camp. In order to develop the film, he would send it out to Salt Lake City, and from there he would have it sent to his brother, who was attending the University of Utah.

== Filming process ==
During his time at the camp, Tatsuno filmed things like his new-born daughter, friends chatting after a church service, his father and son walking through the snow, girls attempting to escape a dust storm, and a teenager skating on a makeshift ice rink. These moments he captured represented the persistence of community through rough conditions. Because of Honderick's warning, the images and shots do not include that of watch towers, guards, and anywhere close to the barbed wire fence surrounding the complex.

In 1990, Tatsuno discussed part of his process for making the film by writing, "When viewing these home-movies, there are several things to keep in mind: 1) These films were taken secretly. Since I was afraid to take many shots in fear of being discovered, you will not see scenes of the guards and sentry at the gate, the barbed wire fences, sentry watchtowers, etc. 2) These films are in color. They tend to make the scene more colorful than the bleak, dusty and arid wasteland it actually was. 3) These are homemovies. As I was merely a hobbyist who enjoyed taking home-movies, these films were taken without the intent of being documentaries. As a result, I focused on family and friends. …The camera shots, thus, do not fathom the emotions hidden within the evacuees - the fear, the loneliness, the despair and the bitterness that we felt." While images appear to show the internees happy and enjoying their lives, Tatsuno said that they were "hamming it up" for the camera, hiding their sorrow.

== Legacy ==
In 1996, Topaz was elected into the National Film Registry that contains films that are to be maintained and preserved in the Library of Congress. There is a version of Topaz that runs forty-eight minutes long, is in color, and may not feature any of Tatsuno's commentary. There is another version that is open to the public, is in black and white, includes Tatsuno's commentary, and runs for about eighty minutes that can be viewed here.

== See also ==
- Japanese American internment
