= Topaz Times =

Newspaper at the WWII Topaz War Relocation Center

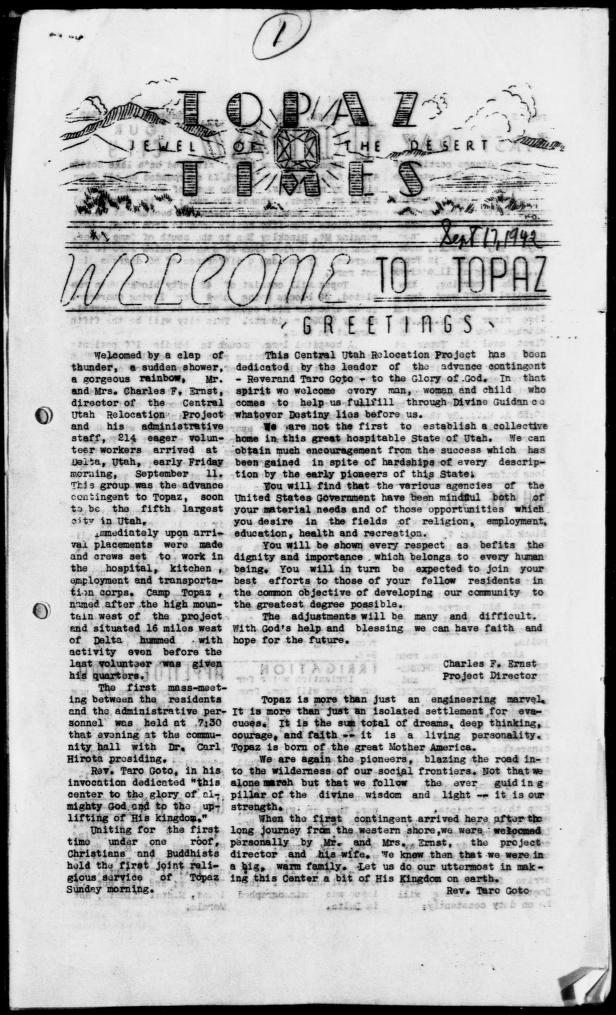
- Topaz Times, September 17, 1942
- Type: Daily newspaper
- Format: Mimeograph
- Editor-in-chief: Evelyn Kirimura
- Founded: September 17, 1942
- Ceased publication: August 9, 1945
- Language: English, Japanese
- Headquarters: Topaz War Relocation Center

The Topaz Times was a mimeographed newspaper published in the Topaz War Relocation Center (Topaz) during the period of Japanese Internment in World War II. The publication of the Times was mandated by the War Relocation Authority (WRA) to ensure proper communication from WRA leaders to residents of the camp. The newspaper was written in both English and Japanese. The Times published daily between September 17, 1942, and August 9, 1945, ceasing publication five months prior to the date the camp closed.

== History ==
In February 1942, President Franklin Delano Roosevelt signed Executive Order 9066, ordering the incarceration of Japanese-born US residents (Issei) and American citizens of Japanese descent (Nisei or Sansei) living in California and the Pacific Northwest, conducted by the WRA. While camps were being built to house people more permanently, many internees were housed in the Tanforan Assembly Center and were later relocated to a total of ten concentration camps throughout the United States. Topaz, the camp located in Delta, Utah, officially opened on September 11, 1942, drawing in internees largely from Tanforan and the San Francisco Bay Area.

One of the major concerns held by the WRA was the means by which it could convey important information to camp residents in Topaz. This concern resulted in the creation of the Topaz Times as a practical means of mass communication of government statements and information for internees, with camp newspapers like the Times being produced under varying levels of supervision and support by the WRA. Because of WRA supervision, the Topaz Times was often considered constrained in the extent of its publication and messaging, leading to the creation of TREK, an incarceree-created literary magazine published in addition to the Times, in which editors tended to have more freedom to express ideas and protest their treatment and incarceration.

The first issue of the Topaz Times was published on September 17, 1942, six days after the camp opened to incarcerees and while the camp was still under construction. Issues were continually published in both English and Japanese until August 9, 1945, when the paper ceased publication. In October of the same year, Topaz closed.

== Organization ==
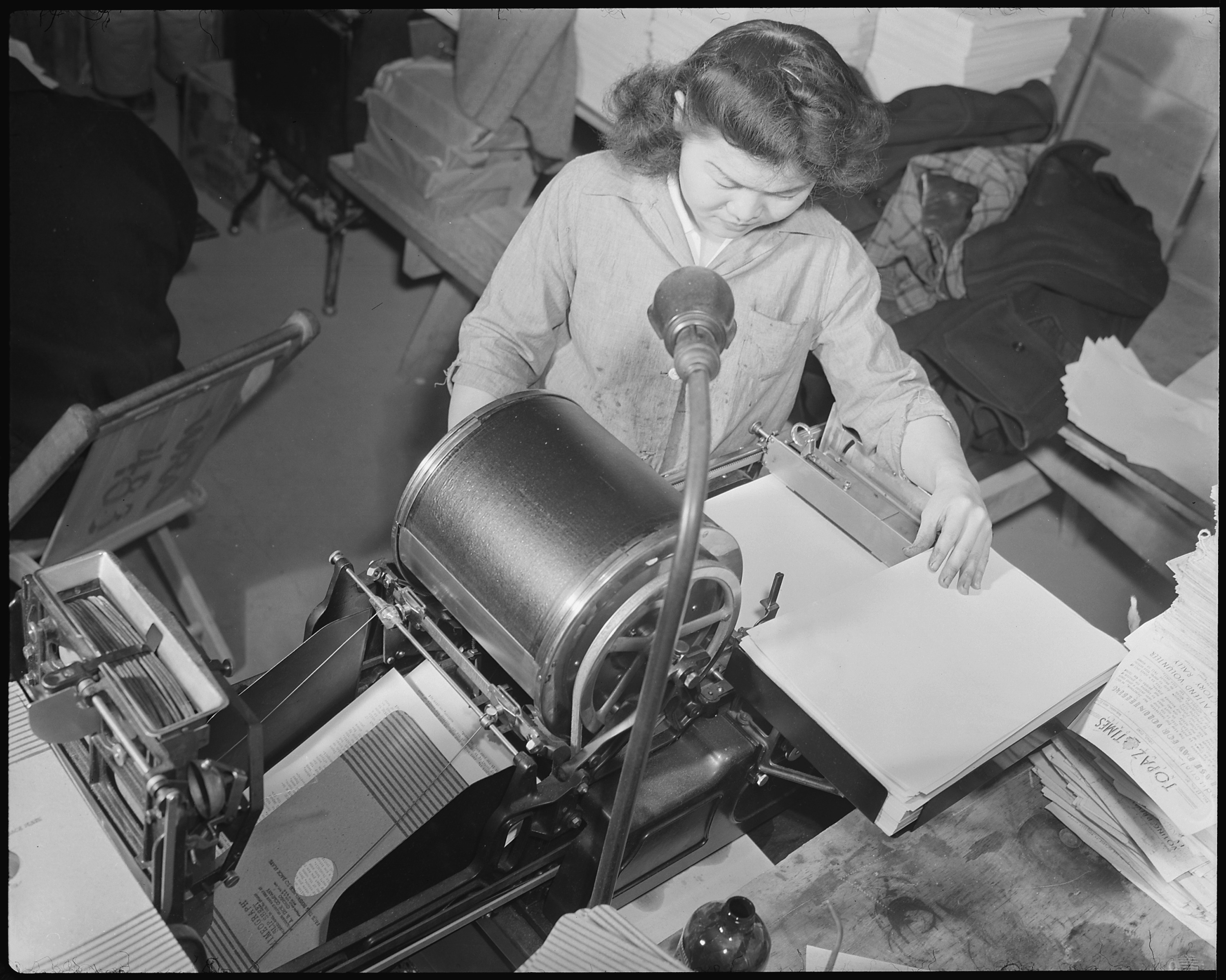
Rose Nakagawa, former student from San Francisco, California, working as a mimeograph operator on the Topaz Times.

A majority of internees at Topaz were transferred from Tanforan Assembly Center, which originally drew incarcerees from the San Francisco Bay Area. The largely urban camp population had a high level of education and professional training. As a result, editors and journalists who had worked on professional newspapers prior to their incarceration were often hired to contribute to both the English and Japanese sections of the newspaper. Contributors were paid monthly by the WRA, receiving either $12, $16, or $19 a month depending on their level of expertise and the position they held.

In December 1942, an issue of the Topaz Times included a list of contributors, which remained throughout subsequent issues. The initial list named Evelyn Kirimura as Editor-in-Chief with Alex Yorichi, Iwao Kawakami, Harumi Kawahara, Haruno Wada, Dan Ota, and Iwao Shimizu as additional editors. Yuri Sugihara, Bennie Nobori, and Hiroshi Tatsuta were also listed as contributors. Later issues introduced others including but not limited to: staff members, artists, language translators, and religious writers. Editors and journalists worked under the supervision of WRA leaders to produce issues of the Times using mimeograph machines to duplicate issues for distribution.

The Topaz Times was published in both English and Japanese for the duration of its publication. The Japanese-language sections were essential for the purposes of the WRA to ensure that internees would be able to read the messages written; however, authorities could not understand what was written in the Japanese portions of the newspaper. WRA authorities, concerned that journalists might write articles outside of approved messages, conducted extensive background checks on translators like Iwao Shimizu and Kiyoshi Yamamoto. Translators could not work until after WRA confirmation of their loyalty to the United States. Their translations of the Japanese sections were later reviewed by authorities before publication.

== Content ==
Although the Topaz Times was permitted relative autonomy in its written messages, the WRA had the ability to cease its publication at any time, and as a result, editors and journalists operated under a level of non-explicit censorship. Because of its reliance on government authorities, publications in the Times tended to take a favorable tone toward the WRA and camp policies, lacking political or highly opinionated messages in an attempt to uphold the Times and conserve its ability to publish content. Its publications describing daily activities at Topaz offer a window into the daily lives of internees in the camp.

Some articles in the newspaper surrounded more controversial topics, such as the Times' report on the WRA-issued "loyalty questionnaire" which internees were required to complete, a survey that included questions regarding the loyalty of incarcerees to the United States government and their willingness to serve in the United States military. The article was followed by two pages of answers from the WRA regarding common questions about the survey before the Japanese translation.

Articles noted that incarcerees were not cut off from those living outside the camp in the surrounding Utah area. In fact, journalists from the Topaz Times were invited to visit the site of a local newspaper, the Millard County Chronicle, a trip that was later reported on in both the Chronicle and the Times. At the end of World War II, when incarcerees were being released from Topaz and other camps, articles reported on anti-Japanese sentiment in the surrounding area and throughout the United States.

Many articles in the Times reported on camp sports, both by announcing information to interested athletes and reporting on games and scores. Because of the WRA's influence, many articles encouraged cultural assimilation through typical American activities and recreation, such as baseball, softball, and tennis rather than Japanese sports like judo.

Other typical articles in the Times included information regarding camp events and activities, WRA announcements, and instructions to incoming incarcerees.

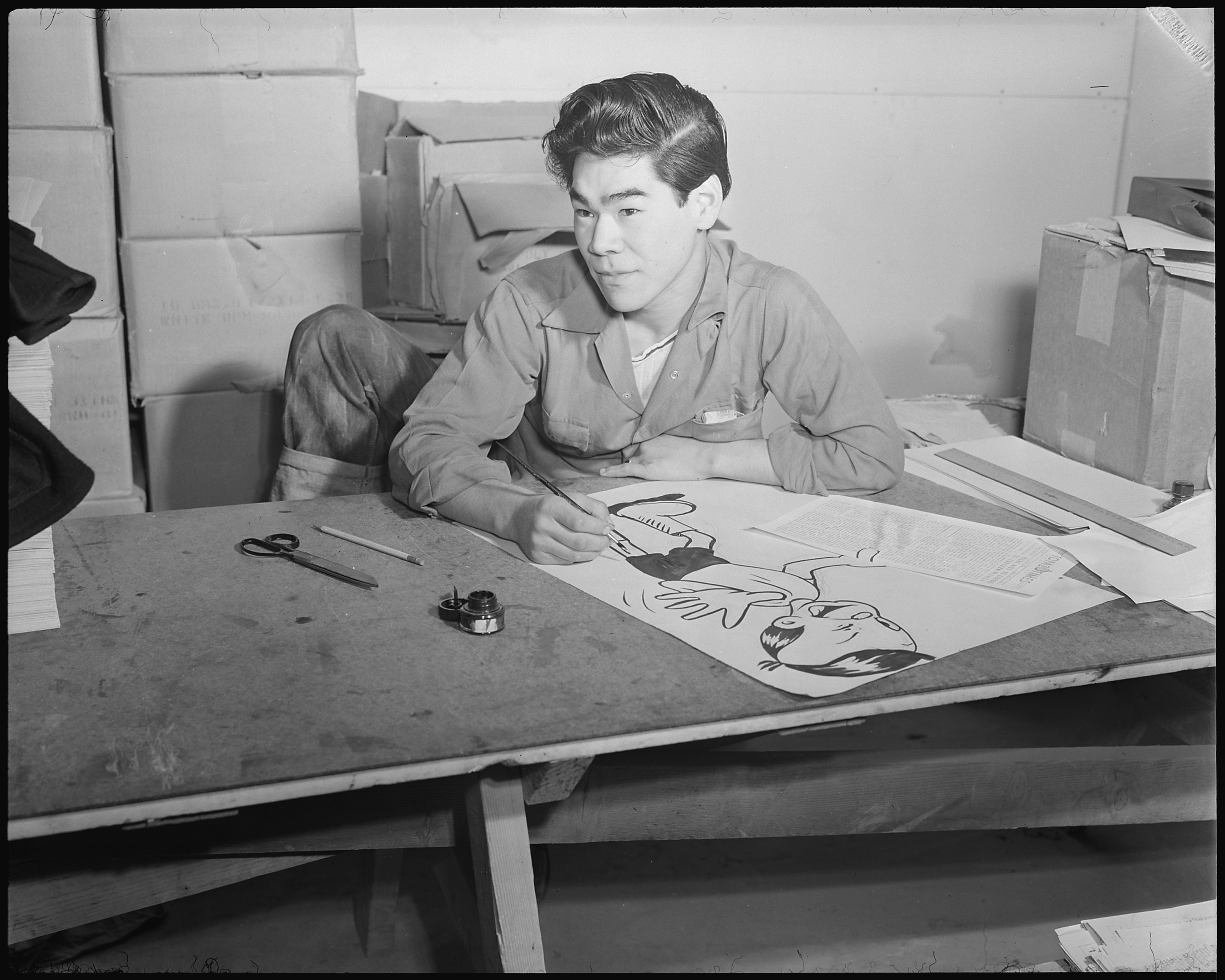
Bennie Nobori, former animator in a Hollywood film studio and cartoonist on the Topaz Times.

=== Comic strip "Jankee" ===
The newspaper was largely written to communicate information broadly, not to make political commentary. Even so, some publications attempted to subtly protest incarceration and the WRA, such as the comic strip by Bennie Nobori, titled "Jankee" (a combination of the words Japanese Yankee). The main character of the strip was a young incarceree at Topaz named Jankee who encountered unexpected in-camp mishaps and misadventures. In "Jankee," Nobori utilized situational humor unique to Topaz and the experiences of interned Japanese Americans to respond to and critique the Americanization often pushed by the WRA, such as the publication of a strip poking fun at the government-issued clothing provided to internees. Other comics included short plots such as Jankee's run-in with camp security while looking for scrap lumber to make furniture, his dislike of dining hall food, and his budding romance with another young incarceree named Topita (a diminutive form of the name Topaz).

=== Reports on the death of resident James Wakasa ===
On April 12, 1943, the Topaz Times published an extra report on the death of a 63-year-old man named James Hatsuki Wakasa, who had been shot by a Topaz guard the day prior, on April 11. The article appeared beneath a statement from the administration by Lorne Hall, Chief of the Community Services Division, which asserted the intention of the WRA to conduct an investigation of Wakasa's death. The story was published in both English and Japanese and was subject to WRA censorship. The Times falsely reported that Wakasa was shot while attempting to crawl through the camp fence, an error which was never corrected in subsequent articles.

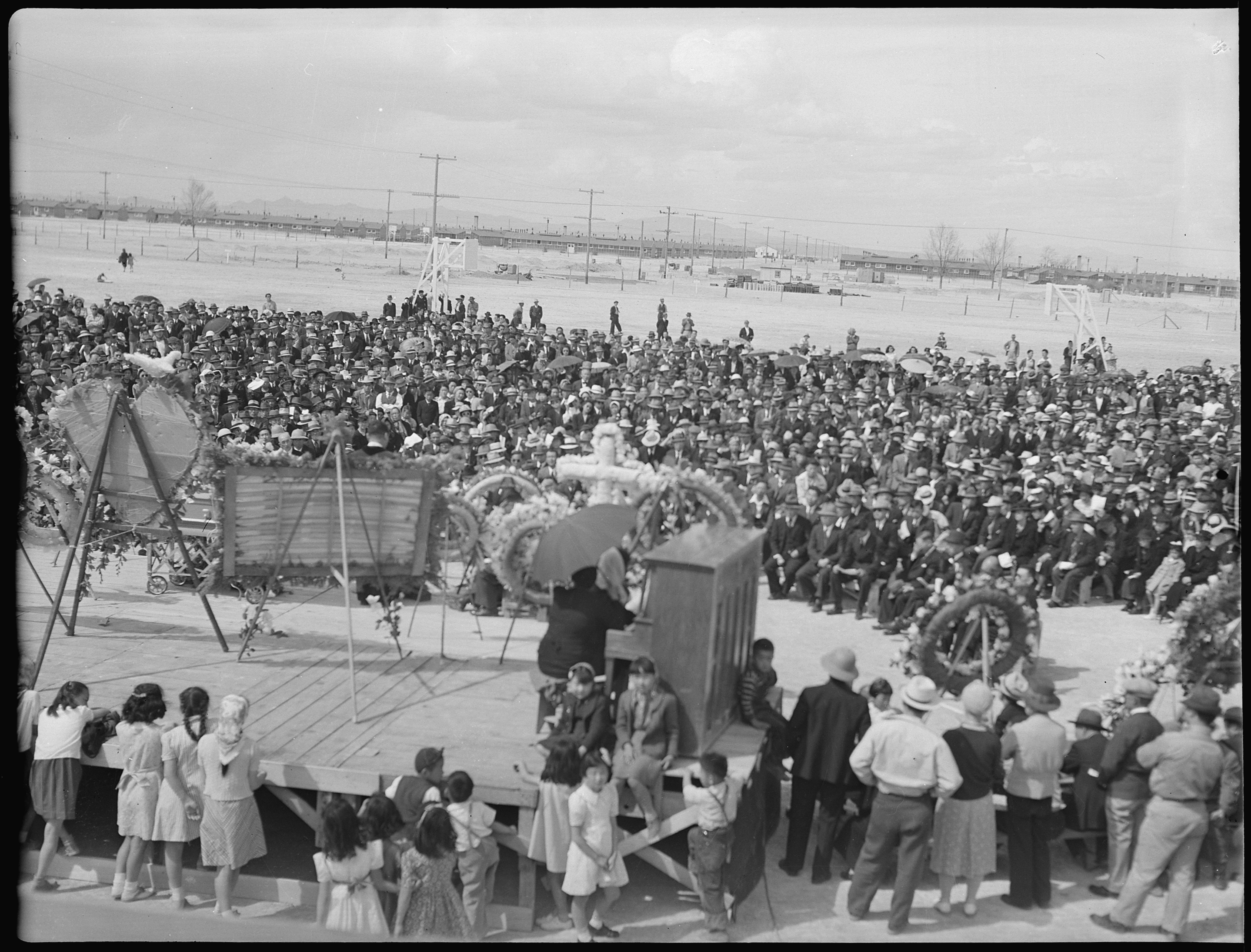
James Wakasa funeral scene.

Throughout the days leading up to Wakasa's funeral, the Topaz Times published reports on the investigation, camp protests, and information regarding his funeral. Although Wakasa had no living relatives, his funeral was attended by thousands of incarcerees, who made paper wreaths and built a stone monument to his memory. They later buried the monument to preserve it from camp authorities who ordered it destroyed. It was later rediscovered and in 2021 was moved to the Topaz Museum. Its relocation sparked significant controversy and debate regarding the proper means of handling the monument.

Concern over the potential response of residents to Wakasa's death led military leaders to issue an emergency alert for increased weaponry as a precaution against violence in the camp. The alert was canceled two days after its initial release. Some Utah newspapers reported briefly on Wakasa's death, though none ran consistent stories following updates on the WRA investigation other than the Topaz Times.

== Legacy ==
In August 1945, the Topaz Times ceased publication, just a few months before the camp was closed entirely and incarcerees were sent to return to their homes or move to new places around the country. Since then, the newspaper has been used to understand the daily lives of internees at Topaz to a greater degree. Alongside TREK and various works of art created in the camp, it provided incarcerees a means of self-expression and identity within the confines of internment.

After incarceration, artist Miné Okubo wrote Citizen 13660, a book with various works art designed to portray daily life at Topaz. Many of her pieces reflect the articles published in the Times and provide additional means of understanding the newspaper and its purpose.

== See also ==
Newspapers similar to the Topaz Times were published by order of the WRA throughout the ten War Relocation Camps across the United States. Other internment camp newspapers include the following:

- Gila News-Courier (Gila River War Relocation Center, Arizona)
- Granada Pioneer (Granada War Relocation Center, Colorado)
- Heart Mountain Sentinel (Heart Mountain War Relocation Center, Wyoming)
- Denson Tribune, originally named Jerome Communiqué (Jerome War Relocation Center, Arkansas)
- Manzanar Free Press (Manzanar War Relocation Center, California)
- Minidoka Irrigator (Minidoka War Relocation Center, Idaho)
- Poston Chronicle (Poston War Relocation Center, Arizona)
- Rohwer Outpost (Rohwer War Relocation Center, Arkansas)
- Tulean Dispatch, later renamed the Newell Star (Tule Lake War Relocation Center, California)
