= Mary Yamashiro Otani =

American community activist

Mary Yamashiro Otani (Japanese: メアリー山城大谷 Mearī Yamashiro Ōtani) (July 5, 1923 in Berkeley, California – August 22, 2005) was a Richmond, California community activist. She was a student at UC Berkeley when she was forcibly removed to an internment center for Japanese Americans following the enactment of Executive Order 9066. Initially, she lived with her family at the Tanforan Assembly Center in San Bruno and later at isolated Topaz War Relocation Center in the desert near Delta, Utah. Later a Quaker group persuaded the authorities to allow college-age students to continue their studies at East Coast schools. Yamashiro then attend Boston University where she met her husband Bill.

She was the summary writer for city elections voter guides. Yamashiro set up the Richmond Farmers Market and the Richmond Annex Senior Center. She monitored the Richmond City Council and the Ports Commission for the League of Women Voters. She was a Unitarian Universalist. She was one of six siblings born to an immigrant Okinawan family and, because of this, established a YWCA college fund for poor first-time college students of Southeast Asian descent.
