= Park Record =

Newspaper published in Park City, Utah, USA

The Park Record
- Type: Semi-weekly newspaper
- Owner(s): Tatiana and Matthew Prince
- Founder: James R. Schupbach
- Publisher: Don Rogers
- Editor: Toria Barnhart
- Founded: 1880
- Language: English
- Headquarters: 1670 Bonanza Dr. Park City, UT 84060 USA
- Website: parkrecord.com

The Park Record is a twice-weekly newspaper published in Park City, Utah that focuses on news in Park City and Summit County, Utah. It is the oldest continuously published newspaper in Utah, and new print issues are released every Wednesday and Saturday.

== History ==
On February 7, 1880, James R. Schupbach published the first edition of the Park Mining Record, although the paper was actually released on February 8 due to delays. Schupbach owned one fifth of The Salt Lake Tribune. He was joined at the Record by Lorenzo E. Camomile and J.J. Buser, both former Tribune employees. Schupbach only published the paper for a few months. He soon moved to Butte, Montana and leased the Record in June 1881 to Harry L. White.

In November 1884, Buser acquired the paper. After a week he dropped the word "mining" from the name and was soon joined by Samuel LePage Raddon, who also previously worked at the Tribune. Raddon purchased a half-interest on December 6, 1884, and would oversee the Record for the next 65 years. Raddon was a controversial figure since, under his guidance, the newspaper established itself as an "outspoken and critical" publication, and "anti-everything, including anti-Mormon, anti-Chinese, and anti-Indian." Raddon added several small, failing papers to the Record.

Buser left the business due to illness in July 1885 and was succeeded by Camomile. On June 19, 1898, the newspaper's newly completed printing plant, and offices, were destroyed by the "Great Fire of 1898," which consumed most of Park City's Main Street, Swede Alley, and Park Avenue. However, the paper released its June 25, 1898 issue on time. The first few post-fire issues were printed by the Salt Lake Herald Republican, until S.L. Raddon purchased new equipment and installed the plant in Park City. He then printed the Record for a few weeks out of a tent he pitched on the site of the destroyed office while the town was being rebuilt. In March 1899, Camomile sold out to William Alexander Raddon, the other partner's brother.

W.A. Raddon ran the paper until he moved to Los Angeles in 1924. At that time he was replaced as co-owner by his nephew, LaPage Harper Raddon. S.L. Raddon, nicknamed "Dad," retired in 1943, and died in 1948. His son L.P. Raddon published the paper until his death in February 1956. His widow Mrs. Maie Raddon inherited the paper, which was published by long-time employee Lynx Langford. In April 1956, H.C. "Mac" McConaughy purchased the Record. A year prior he bought The Morgan County News and The Summit County Bee. After the sale, printing of the Record moved from Park City to the office of the News.

McConaughy was recognized by the Utah Press Association as a "Master Editor and Publisher." He was honored by the National Newspaper Association for the best column of 1959. McConaughy sold the Record to Richard Buys in 1976. A few years prior, Buys bought the Wasatch Wave and Payson Chronicle. The newspaper merged with The Summit County Bee to become The Summit County Bee and Park Record in 1960. However, the publication split into two newspapers in July 1964.

A rival paper called The Park City Newspaper was founded in September 1975. Jan Wilking became its sole owner in 1980. Around that time, the Record was struggling financially, as Park City had only one surviving silver mine, and the skiing industry supported the town only half of the year. In 1983, The Newspaper and the Record merged, with Wiking being the majority stockowner. The name Park Record was kept, but the Record's tabloid format was retired and The Newspaper's larger broadsheet were used instead.

In 1987, Wilking sold the Record to Peter B. Bernhard, owner of The Green Sheet. In 2005, Bernhard sold the Record to MediaNews Group. In 2015, the Nevada-based Swift Communications bought the Record. In 2021, Swift sold its local media and publishing businesses in Utah to the West Virginia-based Ogden Newspapers. In 2023, the paper was sold to Utah billionaire Matthew Prince and his wife Tatiana. Matthew Prince is the co-founder and CEO of internet infrastructure and cybersecurity company Cloudflare. The couple announced plans to convert the paper from a private business into a nonprofit or public benefit corporation.
