= Toyo Suyemoto =

American poet

- Born: January 14, 1916; Oroville, California
- Died: December 30, 2003 (aged 87); Columbus, Ohio
- Other name: Toyo S. Kawakami
- Education: University of California, Berkeley

Toyo Suyemoto (January 14, 1916 – December 30, 2003) was a Japanese-American poet, memoirist, and librarian.

== Biography ==
Toyo Suyemoto was born January 14, 1916, in Oroville, California. She was the daughter of Japanese immigrants, Tsutomu Howard Suyemoto and Mitsu Hyakusoku Suyemoto. She was raised in the Nihonmachi, or Japantown, of Sacramento, California. She attended University of California, Berkeley where she majored in English and Latin. She married Iwao Kawakami, a Nisei journalist. The couple moved to Oakland, California, where their son, Kay, was born in October 1941.

== Early and personal life ==
Toyo Suyemoto's early life was influenced by growing up in Berkeley, California. Toyo was the oldest of 10 children in her family. Her appreciation of Japanese poetic forms came from her mother who encouraged Japanese literature and English. Her later work is a reflection of her mother's influence. Suyemoto's passion for writing poetry began from a young age and was widely published in Nisei literary magazines before the war. She gained recognition for her formal, controlled, and emotionally impactful poems and was often compared to well-known modern female lyricists like Wylie, Teasdale, and Millay. Her pre-war contributions to Nisei literary magazines displayed her talent and laid the foundation for her later achievements.

The outbreak of World War II changed Suyemoto's life. Her baby son, Kay, and her parents and siblings were forced to relocation, first to the Tanforan Racetrack in San Bruno and then to the Topaz camp. Her husband, Iwao Kawakami, known as a journalist, left Suyemoto and Kay during the first weeks of Japanese American relocation and incarceration. She experienced the loss her mother's scrapbooks of poetry and literature. During internment camps she described as overcrowded living conditions and the separation of families, making it difficult for Suyemoto and her siblings to support each other. Suyemoto and others in the community expressed resilience through creative expression and camp publications. During the war, Suyemoto's work gained recognition, two of her poems published in the Yale Review in 1946.

Suyemoto's personal experiences shaped her identity. Her son, Kay had a minor cold in Tanforan, which worsened due to exposure to horse dander and dusk resulting in hospitalization. Tragically, Kay, who had developed severe asthma and allergies during internment, passed away years later for a respiratory illness. Her writings reflected the main idea of loss, memory, and hope. The legacy of Suyemoto and other Japanese-American women writers have altered American literary history and continue to inspire prospective writers and activists.

== Internment ==
After the bombing of Pearl Harbor on December 7, 1941, Toyo decided to rejoin her family in Berkeleywhile her husband Iwao moved to San Francisco for a job with a newspaper. The couple separated later that month, and Toyo took her son Kay with her to Berkeley. That spring, as part of the enforcement of Executive Order 9066, she and Kay were incarcerated at Tanforan Assembly Center. From there, Toyo and Kay, as well as her parents and siblings, were sent to Topaz Relocation Center, in Delta, UT. At Topaz, she taught English and Latin as a teacher and worked in the public library in the camp. She also helped to create schools for the children. Suyemoto continued writing poems during her years of incarceration in Topaz, as her passion for writing gave her a reason to survive incarceration. Suyemoto continued writing poems during her years of incarceration in Topaz. She was friends with artist Miné Okubo and she also served on the staff of the camp's literary magazine. Several of her poems were published there. During that time, Iwao never visited his wife or son and the couple divorced after the war. In the early 1980s, Suyemoto revisited Topaz and testified before the Commission on Wartime Relocation and Internment of Civilians about her time in the camp. She described how the poor conditions and lack of healthcare impacted her and her family.

== Career and works ==
Suyemoto originally published her works under her husband's surname, Kawakami, but later preferred to be remembered by her family's surname, Suyemoto, after their divorce. Suyemoto is most popularly known for her memoir I Call to Remembrance: Toyo Suyemoto's Years of Internment was published posthumously in 2007 by Rutgers University Press. She also published a book, which was a 1971 reference for librarians, Acronyms in Education and the Behavioral Sciences. The following is a list of poems created by Suyemoto during her years of internment:

- "Gain" in December 1942
- "In Topaz" in February 1943
- "Transplanting" in June 1943
- "Promise" in June 1943
- "Retrospect" in June 1943

== Later life and death ==
After the war, she moved with her parents to Cincinnati, Ohio. She worked in the libraries of the University of Cincinnati and the Cincinnati Art Museum. In 1958, her son Kay died of a disease contracted in the camp. She attended the University of Michigan to get her Masters of Library Science. In 1964, she began working for the Ohio State University Library. During this time, she spoke frequently to high schooler and university audiences to educate and bring national attention to the long-lasting impacts of incarceration for Japanese-Americans. She retired in 1985. Before her death, she donated over forty boxes of poems and works to OSU, with whom she had a close relationship with due to her long career at the university. Suyemoto remained active in the arts community until her death in December 2003. Although her poetry was not very well known, she published poems in publications including The Yale Review and Commonground. Poet Lawson Fusao Inada referred to her as "our major Camp Poet and Nikkei Poet Laureate". The Rutgers University Press published her memoir posthumously in 2007.
