= List of LGBTQ periodicals in Utah =

Below is a list of Utah-based periodicals (printed magazines, journals and newspapers) catering to lesbian, gay, bisexual, transgender, and queer (LGBTQ) people, ordered by first issue date:

- The Gayzette (1975)
- The Salt Lick (1976)
- The Open Door (1977–1981)
- Women Aware Newsletter (1979–1985)
- Gay Community News (1981–1982)
- The Salt City Source (1984–1985)
- The Up Front (1984–1985)
- The Community Reporter (1985)
- The Best Source (1985)
- Triangle (1986–1990)
- Angles (1989)
- The Bridge (1990–1993)
- Queer Fucker's Magazine (1990–1991)
- Womyn's Community News (1991-1995)
- The Salt and Sage (1991–1993)
- Out Front Review (1992–1993)
- The Pillar (1993–1997)
- The Center of Attention (1993–1997)
- The Labrys (1995–1997)
- The Xchange (1997–2000)
- Womyn 4 Women (2003–2005)
- Salt Lake Metro (2004–2006)
- QSaltLake (2006–present)
