= Dave Tatsuno =

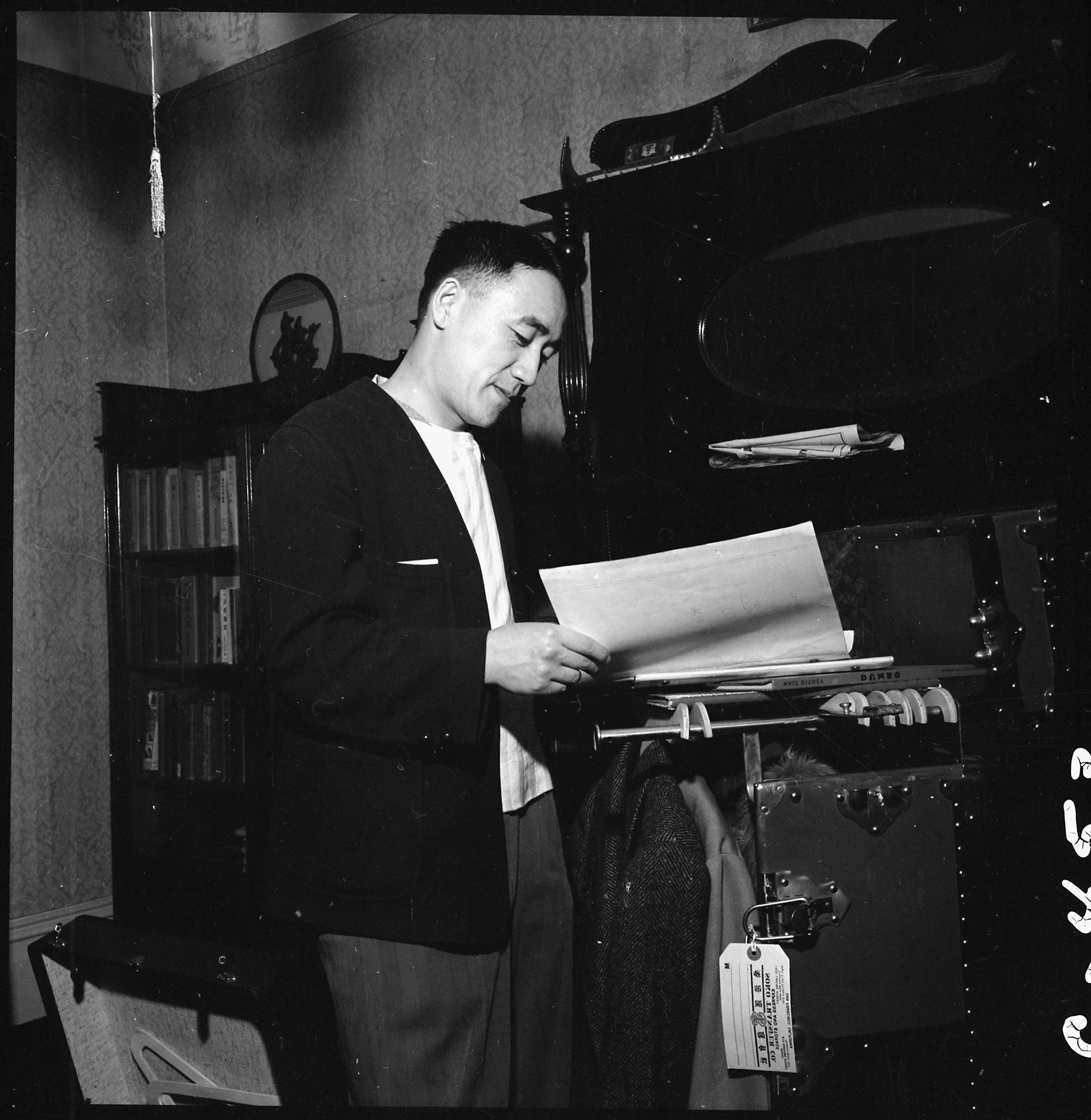
Dave Tatsuno, shown shortly before his family's forced evacuation from San Francisco.

Dave Masaharu Tatsuno (Japanese: 龍野 正春, August 18, 1913 – January 26, 2006, in San Jose, California) was a Japanese American businessman who documented life in his family's internment camp during World War II. His footage was later compiled into the film Topaz (named for the Topaz War Relocation Center where he was confined). The film was placed in the National Film Registry, part of the Library of Congress, in 1996.

Born in San Francisco in 1913, Tatsuno was a 1936 graduate of the University of California, Berkeley. After graduation, he went to work at Nichi Bei Bussan, a San Francisco department store his father established in 1902. At Topaz, Tatsuno was put in charge of the camp's co-operative store. Upon Tatsuno's release from Topaz in 1945, he reopened his store but moved his family to San Jose in 1948 after his 7-year-old son died during a routine tonsillectomy. Besides being a prominent civic leader, he spent most of his post-war years running Nichi Bei Bussan and had opened a second one in San Jose after relocating his family there. The San Jose store is run by one of his daughters while San Francisco store closed in 1997 after the death of his brother Masateru "Tut".

Tatsuno was predeceased by his wife Alice (died in 2005; née Okada), whom he married in 1938, and a son. He was survived by their five other children, four grandchildren and two great-grandchildren.

== See also ==
- Japanese American internment
