= The Richfield Reaper =

Newspaper in Richfield, Utah

- Type: Weekly newspaper
- Owner: CherryRoad Media
- Founder: George Hales
- Founded: 1887
- Language: English
- Headquarters: 494 N. Main Street; Richfield, Utah
- Sister newspapers: Uintah Basin Standard; Vernal Express
- Website: richfieldreaper.com

The Richfield Reaper is a weekly newspaper serving the people of south central Utah, printed and published in Richfield, Utah, United States. Its primary areas of coverage include Sevier, Wayne and Piute counties, but is also read in homes in Sanpete and Garfield counties. Available on newsstands Tuesday evenings, it is published and delivered via the US Postal Service on Wednesday.

== History ==
In 1887, George Hales, of The Southern Utonian in Beaver, Utah, moved to Richfield, Utah, to launch the Sevier Advocate with printer W.M. Cowley. Hales soon renamed the paper to the Richfield Advocate and cut his ties to the Utonian. In early 1890, attorney Sol Sprague moved to Richfield. He later joined the paper. On April 29, 1890, Hales was arrested for violating the Edmunds–Tucker Act by practicing polygamy. In September 1893, Sprague sued Hales in civil court to dissolve their partnership and sell off the business. Sprague appears to have been successful. He gained possession of the paper and in 1894 sold it to brothers John Meteer and Dwight Meeter.

On the night of October 17, 1898, a fire destroyed the paper's office. The print archive was lost. Arson was suspected. That November, A.B. Williams, formerly of The Pyramid of Mount Pleasant, purchased the defunct Advocate's subscription list from the Meeters, bought a new plant from Salt Lake City and relaunched the paper in December. Williams suffered from liver and kidney problems. He suffered an episode in March 1899. While recovering in bed, for unknown reasons he renamed his paper to the Richfield Reaper. George H. Grosby soon joined Williams as co-owner. Grosby retired from the paper in 1903 to engage in the practice of law. John J. Woodring, formerly of The Pyramid, then joined Williams as co-owner.

After nearly 17 years at the paper, in 1907, Williams sold his stake to C.E. Hanway. Woodring severed his connection to the Reaper a few years later. Hanway promoted Anti-Mormonism, which made him unpopular with locals as that was the region's dominant church. In 1910, the LDS Church organized The Richfield Reaper Publishing Co., which bought the paper. Several people managed the business over the next five years, including William Bean, A.J. Bird, George M. Jones, John Hood and Niels C. Poulson.

In January 1915, James L. Ewing, formerly of the Manti Messenger, succeeded Bean as editor. He and P.V. Petersen leased the paper from James M. Peterson, who had bought it from the church. That May, Petersen ended his partnership with Ewing. In December the Reaper absorbed the Richfield Sun. In 1920, Dr. M. Markus bought the Reaper from Ewing. Ewing went on to became deputy sheriff of Salt Lake County. In 1928, Markus was elected president of the Utah Press Association. In 1930, Markus sold the Reaper to Joseph L. Asbury. In 1932, Asbury bought the Price Sun and the News-Advocate. He merged them to form the Sun Advocate.

In March 1934, Joseph J. Fuellenbach bought the Reaper from Ashby. He died that December after he accidentally knocked a pistol off a shelf in his shop and fatally shot himself while attempting to catch it. His widow Rula Fuellenbach then operated the paper. She died in 1959 from a heart attack. Her son Norman Fuellenbach published the Reaper until his death in 1977. His wife and son, Marge and Mark, in 1990 sold the paper to Brehm Communications Inc. In 2022, Brehm sold the Reaper to CherryRoad Media.

== Other publications ==
In addition to printing The Richfield Reaper and Reaper Extra, the printing plant located at The Reaper office also serves the printing needs for a variety of clients, including other community newspapers, special sections, and high school and college publications. Among those are Sun Advocate, Price; Emery County Progress, Castle Dale; Smart Shopper, Price and Castle Dale; The Insider, Wayne County and Garfield County; Sanpete Messenger, Manti and Gunnison Valley editions; Salina Sun, Salina; The Times-News, Nephi; The Millard County Gazette, Delta; Gunnison Valley Gazette, Gunnison; and The Mainstreet Business Journal, Washington.
