= Emery Telcom =

US American telecommunication company

- Type: Cooperative
- Industry: Telecommunications
- Founded: 1950 in Orangeville, Utah, US
- Headquarters: Orangeville, Utah, US
- Products: Cable TV, Broadband Internet, Phone Service, DSL
- Services: Cable Internet Cable Television; Internet Service; Digital Microwave; DSL; Fiber Optic Cable Facilities; Frame Relay; ISDN; Voice Services; VPN
- Subsidiaries: Carbon/Emery Telcom; Emery Telcom Business Services; Emery Telcom Computers; Emery Telcom Internet; Emery Telcom Long Distance; Emery Telecommunications & Video Call Center; Hanksville Telcom
- Website: www.etv.net www.emerytelcom.com

Emery Telcom is a telecommunications company, which provides phone service, DSL service, cable TV and cable internet to much of eastern and south eastern Utah. Emery Telcom was founded in 1950 as a cooperative in Orangeville, Utah. It joined a consortium with four other Utah independent telephone companies to form Western FiberNet.

== History ==
Emery Telcom was founded in 1950 in Orangeville, Utah. It joined a consortium with four other Utah independent telephone companies to form Western FiberNet.

On December 11, 2008, Emery Telcom announced and confirmed that it had signed a definitive asset purchase for the Precis Communications' cable systems in Moab, Price, Helper, Wellington, East Carbon, Sunnyside, Castle Dale, Huntington, Orangeville, Ferron, Monticello and Blanding, Utah. All the other Cable systems that Precis owned were sold to other small telcom companies.

This purchase was completed on February 2, 2009. This purchase briefly made Emery Telcom the sole provider of non-cellular communications services in Carbon and Emery counties. Approximately one year after this purchase, BEH Communications, a small WISP started competing with Emery Telcom in Carbon County. River Canyon Wireless, another small WISP began competing with Emery Telcom in Grand County in mid-2009, also launching WISP services in Emery County in 2011, making Emery Telcom no longer the sole provider of non-cellular communications in virtually any of its service areas.

In 2009, Emery Telcom purchased a small (three store) chain of custom computers, and computer repair stores, located in eastern and southeastern Utah, named Top Line Computers. This purchase introduced Emery Telcom into the computer sales and repair markets. Emery Telcom renamed these stores Emery Telcom Computers. In Grand County, they combined Emery Telcom Computers with an Emery Telcom Video (Cable TV and Internet services) office, effectively giving them their first local office in the Moab and Grand County areas. As of 2012, the Moab office has been scaled down, and no longer offers computer repair services or retail services of computer parts or software.

On June 3, 2012, Emery offered landline service in Moab, Utah in direct competition with Frontier Communications.
