= Vernal Express =

Newspaper in Vernal, Utah

- Type: Weekly newspaper
- Owner: CherryRoad Media
- Founder: Kate Jean Boan
- Founded: 1891
- Language: English
- Headquarters: 50 E. Main St., Vernal, UT 84078
- Sister newspapers: The Richfield Reaper; Uintah Basin Standard
- Website: vernalexpressnews.com

The Vernal Express is a weekly newspaper published in Vernal, Utah.

== History ==
On January 2, 1891, Ms. Kate Jean Boan published the first edition of the Uintah Pappoose in Vernal, Utah. A year later James M. Barker bought the paper and relaunched it as the Vernal Express on February 11, 1892.

The paper was acquired by J. Alma Holdaway in 1898, Bartlett Bros. & Merkeley in 1899, Dan H. Hillman and Ashley Bartlett in 1900, and a company led by Don B. Colton in 1910.

James H. Wallis became editor in 1917. He was born in England where in his youth he had apprenticed as a printer. While visiting Vernal working as a health inspector, a wealthy business owner learned of his printing experience and convinced him to run the paper. He bought it five years later. J.H. Wallis owned the Express until his death in 1940.

His son William B. Wallis succeeded him, and died in 1986. His son Jack R. Wallis succeeded him, and died in 2003. His son Steven R. Wallis succeeded him, and died in 2007. Later that year his widow Tami Wallis sold the Express to Gull Communications, a subsidiary owned by Brehm Communications of San Diego. In 2022, Brehm sold the Reaper to CherryRoad Media.
