= Box Elder News Journal =

- Type: Weekly newspaper
- Founder: J.R. Hunter
- Publisher: Casey Claybaugh
- Managing editor: Sean Hales
- Founded: 1894
- Language: English
- City: Brigham City, Utah
- Website: benewsjournal.com

The Box Elder News Journal is a newspaper in Brigham City, Utah, United States. It was started in 1894 and has been published by three generations of the Claybaugh family.

== History ==
In April 1894, J.R. Hunter founded the Box Elder County News. In 1898, Charles Pasco and Hyrum Standing bought the paper and dropped the word "county" from the name. In 1900, S.C. Wixom bought out Pasco. In 1904, Standing sold his stake to S. Norman Lee. On January 15, 1909, B.H. Jones and J.E. Mangum published the first edition of the Box Elder Journal. That April, Lee was succeeded as News editor by Victor E. Madsen. In 1910, Royal M. Jeppson became owner of the Journal, followed five years later by John F. Erdmann. In 1919, Erdmann sold the Journal to Will R. Holmes. In June 1922, Wixom became News editor.

In July 1938, The Daily Journal and the semi-weekly Box Elder News merged to form the Box Elder News-Journal. Will R. Holmes of the Journal became managing editor and S.C. Wixom of the News became business manager. J.E. Ryan was company president and general manager. In July 1942, Ryan sold his controlling interest in the business to William M. Long and Charles W. Claybaugh. In 1950, Claybaugh bought out Long.

1962, Claybaugh was elected president of the National Editorial Association. He was the first person from Utah to hold that position. In 1969, he was awarded the Amos Award from the National Newspaper Association. Claybaugh taught journalism classes at the University of Utah. In 1975, Claybaugh died. His son Charles C. “Tuff” Claybaugh then inherited the paper. He served a term as president of the Utah Press Association and published the paper until his retirement. In 2009, Casey Claybaugh became publisher of the News-Journal. In 2020, Tuff Claybaugh died.
