= Wasatch Wave =

Weekly newspaper published in Heber City, Utah

- Type: Weekly newspaper
- Format: Broadsheet
- Owner: Wave Publishing INC.
- Founder: William H. Buys
- Editor: Laurie Wynn
- Founded: 1889
- Headquarters: 165 S. 100 West Heber City, UT 84032 United States
- Circulation: 4,500
- OCLC number: 12260840
- Website: wasatchwave.com

The Wasatch Wave is a weekly newspaper in Heber, Utah, United States. It was started in 1889. Historical digital archives are available at Utah Digital Newspapers.

== History ==
On March 23, 1889, attorney William H. Buys published the first edition of the Wasatch Wave. In his first editorial, he wrote: "In wafting the Wasatch Wave we realize it is but a tiny ripple upon the great ocean of journalism, but we sincerely hope and trust that it may grow and gather strength as it proceeds on its perilous journey. Buys went on to serve as Wasatch County Attorney, Heber City Attorney, and president of the Utah Press Association. In November 1909, Buys died.

The paper was acquired by Charles N. Broadbent in January 1910, followed by John A. Wallis in August 1939, and then brothers J. Harold Mountford and Frank W. Mountford in March 1942. The Mountford family sold the Wave to Richard "Dick" Buys and his wife Sue Buys in 1974. The new owner was the great-nephew of the paper's founder. The Wave was inherited by their daughters Laurie Buys-Wynn and Kari McFee, along with McFee’s husband, Paul. In July 2025, the paper was put up for sale. At that time the publication had a circulation of 4,500.

== Bibliography ==
- Merwin G. Fairbanks, A History of The Wasatch Wave, A Weekly Newspaper in Heber, Utah, Provo, Utah: Brigham Young University, 1964, 280pp.
