= Southern Utah News =

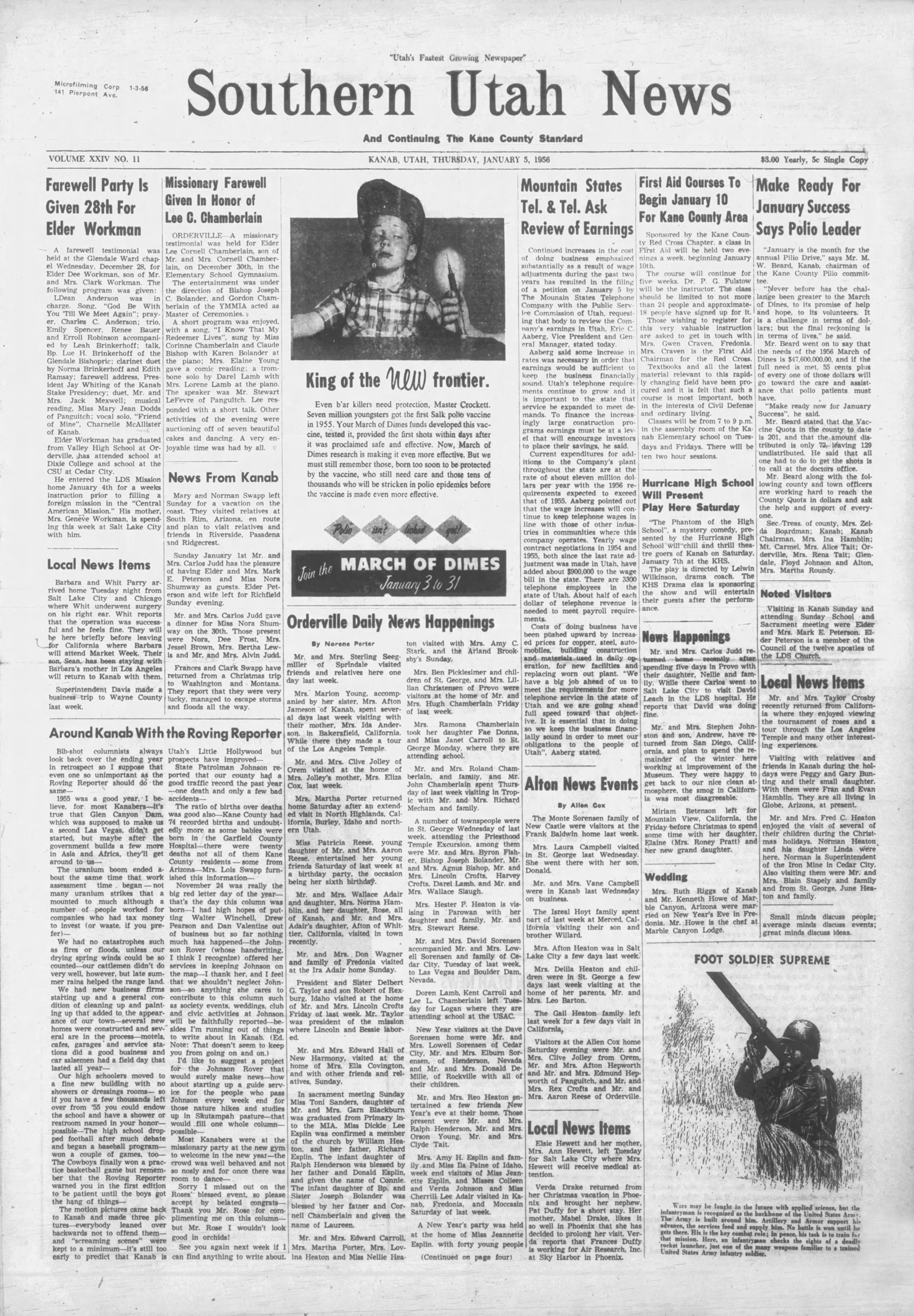
- The January 5, 1956 front page of the Southern Utah News
- Type: Weekly newspaper
- Format: Broadsheet
- Owner(s): Uzona Media, LLC.
- Founder(s): Arthur W. Francis; Rose H. Hamblin
- Publisher: Don Jennings
- Managing editor: Brooke Knighton
- Founded: 1929
- Language: English
- Headquarters: Kanab, Utah
- Circulation: 1,500
- ISSN: 0049-1659
- OCLC number: 3929958
- Website: sunews.net

Southern Utah News is a newspaper in Kanab, Utah, United States. It reports on Kane County and the Arizona Strip.

== History ==
On June 28, 1929, the first edition of the Kane County Standard was published. The sheet was a 6 column, 4 page paper. Mrs. Rose H. Hamblin was editor and Arthur W. Francis was publisher. Francis was the nephew of Will Jay Peters, publisher of the Garfield County News. Hamblin was a librarian and community organizer.

After a few months, Francis turned the paper over to Peters, who died in November 1929. His widow Mrs. Elnora Peters then managed the Standard. In April 1937, George R. Swain took over as publisher. In October 1939, Elmar Walton bought the Standard. At that time Hamblin retired as editor. The paper was soon returned to Swain, who was also publisher of the Garfield County News. In February 1941, he sold the Standard to the Standard Publishing Co., who then installed a printing plant in Kanab.

In July 1945, Myron W. Martin bought the paper from A.C. Saunders and his wife, who were owners in the business for five years and had operated it for the past eight months. In July 1950, Errol G. Brown acquired the Standard. In 1953, the paper was renamed to the Southern Utah News. In May 1966, Brown sold the News to Marlin B. Brown for $18,000. It was then acquired by Dennis and Dixie Brunner in 1992, Neal and Megan Brown in 2021, Andy and Rhonda Gant in 2022, and Don Jennings and Sue Cosby in 2025.
