= Topaz War Relocation Center =

- Central Utah Relocation Center (Topaz)
- U.S. National Register of Historic Places
- U.S. National Historic Landmark
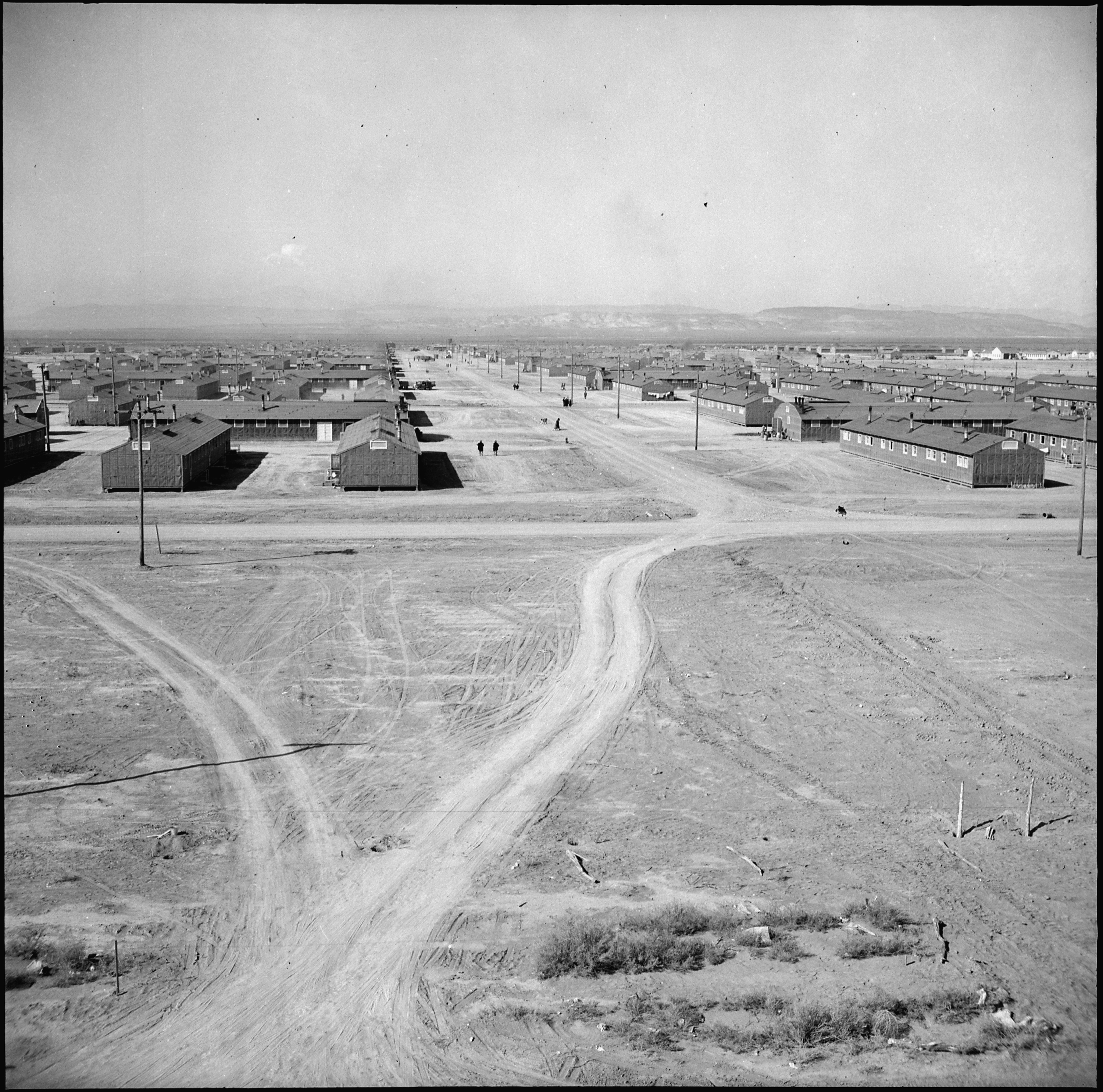
- Looking down a main thoroughfare at Topaz (October 18, 1942)
- Location: Millard County, Utah, United States
- Nearest city: Delta, Utah
- Coordinates: 39°24′52″N 112°46′22″W
- Area: 300 acres (120 ha)
- Built: 1942
- Architect: Daley Brothers
- NRHP reference No.: 74001934

Significant dates
- Added to NRHP: January 2, 1974
- Designated NHL: March 29, 2007

The Topaz War Relocation Center, also known as the Central Utah Relocation Center (Topaz) and briefly as the Abraham Relocation Center, was one of ten Japanese American Segregation Centers in which Americans of Japanese descent and immigrants who had come to the United States from Japan, called Nikkei were incarcerated. President Franklin Roosevelt signed Executive Order 9066 in February 1942, ordering people of Japanese ancestry to be incarcerated in what were euphemistically called "relocation centers" like Topaz during World War II. Most of the people incarcerated at Topaz came from the Tanforan Assembly Center and previously lived in the San Francisco Bay Area. The camp was opened in September 1942 and closed in October 1945.

The camp, approximately 15 miles (24.1 km) west of Delta, Utah, consisted of 19,800 acres (8,012.8 ha), with a 640 acres (259.0 ha) main living area. Most internees lived in the main living area, though some lived off-site as agricultural and industrial laborers. The approximately 9,000 internees and staff made Topaz into the fifth-largest city in Utah at the time. The extreme temperature fluctuations of the arid area combined with uninsulated barracks made conditions very uncomfortable, even after the belated installation of pot-bellied stoves. The camp housed two elementary schools and a high school, a library, and some recreational facilities. Camp life was documented in a newspaper, Topaz Times, and in the literary publication Trek. Internees worked inside and outside the camp, mostly in agricultural labor. Many internees became notable artists.

In the winter of 1942–1943, a loyalty questionnaire asked prisoners if they would declare their loyalty to the United States of America and if they would be willing to enlist. The questions were divisive, and prisoners who were considered "disloyal" because of their answers on the loyalty questionnaire were sent to the Tule Lake Segregation Camp. One internee, James Wakasa, was shot and killed for being too close to the camp's fence. Topaz prisoners held a large funeral and stopped working until administrators relaxed security.

In 1983, Jane Beckwith founded the Topaz Museum Board. Topaz became a U.S. National Historic Landmark in 2007. After many years of organizing, fundraising, and collecting information and artifacts, the Topaz Museum was built in Delta and debuted with a display of the art created at Topaz. Permanent exhibits, installed in 2017, chronicle the people who were interned there and tell their stories.

== Terminology ==
Since the end of World War II, there has been debate over the terminology used to refer to Topaz and the other camps in which Americans of Japanese ancestry and their immigrant parents were imprisoned by the United States government during the war. Topaz has been referred to as a "relocation camp", "relocation center", "internment camp", and "concentration camp", and the controversy over which term is the most appropriate continued throughout the late 1990s. In a preface to a 1997 book on Topaz written and published by the Topaz Museum, the Topaz Museum Board states that it is accurate to refer to the camps as a "detention camp" or "concentration camp" and its residents as "prisoners" or "internees".

== History ==
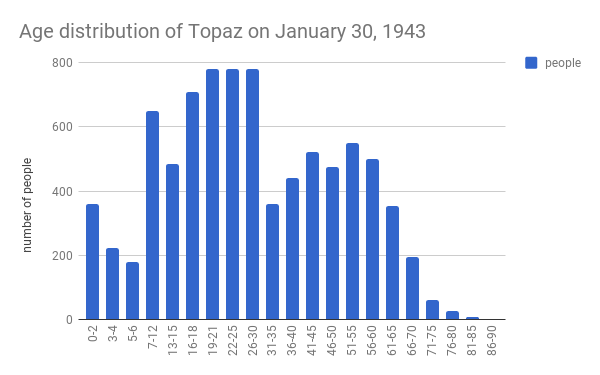
Chart showing the age distribution at Topaz Internment Center on January 30, 1943

In December 1941, Imperial Japan attacked Pearl Harbor in Hawaii. Shortly afterwards in February 1942, President Franklin Roosevelt signed Executive Order 9066. The order forced approximately 120,000 Americans of Japanese descent (Nisei) and Japanese-born residents (Issei) in California, Oregon, Washington, and Alaska on the West Coast of the United States to leave their homes. About 5,000 left the off-limits area during the "voluntary evacuation" period, and avoided internment. The remaining 110,000 were soon removed from their homes by Army and National Guard troops.

Topaz was opened September 11, 1942, and eventually became the fifth-largest city in Utah, with over 9,000 internees and staff, and covering approximately 31 square miles (80.3 km^{2}) (mostly used for agriculture). A total of 11,212 people lived at Topaz at one time or another. Utah governor Herbert B. Maw opposed the relocation of any Japanese Americans into the state, stating that if they were such a danger to the West Coast, they would be a danger to Utah. Most internees arrived at Topaz from the Tanforan or Santa Anita Assembly Centers; the majority hailed from the San Francisco Bay Area. Sixty-five percent were Nisei, American citizens born to Japanese immigrants. The camp was governed by Charles F. Ernst until June 1944, when the position was taken over by Luther T. Hoffman following Ernst's resignation. It was closed on October 31, 1945.

Topaz was originally known as the Central Utah Relocation Authority, and then the Abraham Relocation Authority, but the names were too long for post office regulations. The final name, Topaz, came from Topaz Mountain which overlooks the camp from 9 miles (14.5 km) away.

Topaz was the primary internment site in the state of Utah. A smaller camp existed briefly a few miles north of Moab, which was used to isolate a few men considered to be troublemakers prior to their being sent to Leupp, Arizona. A site at Antelope Springs, in the mountains west of Topaz, was used as a recreation area by the residents and staff of Topaz.

== Life ==
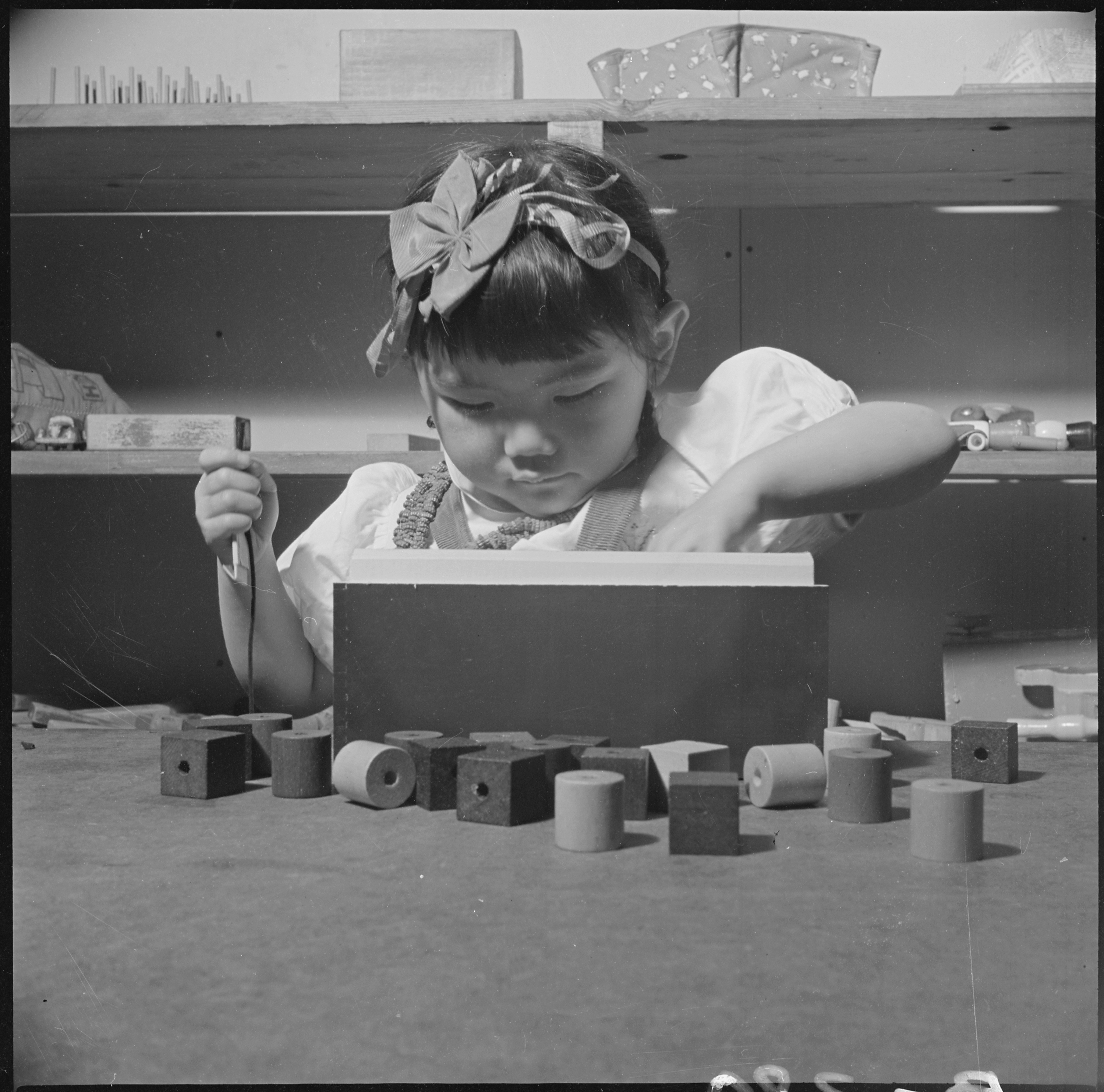
A young internee playing in a nursery school

=== Climate ===
Most internees came from the San Francisco Bay Area, which has a warm-summer Mediterranean climate, with moist mild winters and dry summers. Topaz had an extreme climate, located at 4,580 feet (1,400 m) above sea level in the Sevier Desert. A "Midlatitude Desert" under the Köppen classification, temperatures could vary greatly throughout the day. The area experienced powerful winds and dust storms. One such storm caused structural damage to 75 buildings in 1944. Temperatures could reach below freezing from mid-September until the end of May. The average temperature in January was 26 °F (−3 °C). Spring rains turned the clay soil to mud, which bred mosquitoes. Summers were hot, with occasional thunderstorms and temperatures that could exceed 100 °F (38 °C). In 1942, the first snowfall occurred on October 13, before camp construction was fully complete.

=== Architecture and living arrangements ===
Topaz contained a living complex known as the "city", about 1 square mile (2.6 km^{2}), as well as extensive agricultural lands. Within the city, 42 blocks were for internees, 34 of which were residential. Each residential block housed 200–300 people, housed in barracks that held five people within a single 20-by-20-foot (6.1 by 6.1 m) room. Families were generally housed together, while single adults would be housed with four other unrelated individuals. Residential blocks also contained a recreation hall, a mess hall, an office for the block manager, and a combined laundry/toilet/bathing facility. Each block contained only four bathtubs for all the women and four showers for all the men living there. These packed conditions often resulted in little privacy for residents.

Barracks were built out of wood frame covered in tarpaper, with wooden floors. Many internees moved into the barracks before they were completed, exposing them to harsh weather. Eventually, they were lined with sheetrock, and the floors filled with masonite. While the construction began in July 1942, the first inmates moved in in September 1942, and the camp was not completed until early 1943. Camp construction was completed in part by 214 interned laborers who volunteered to arrive early and help build the camp. Rooms were heated by pot-bellied stoves. There was no furniture provided. Inmates used communal leftover scrap wood from construction to build beds, tables, and cabinets. Some families also modified their living quarters with fabric partitions. Water came from wells and was stored in a large wooden tank, and was "almost undrinkable" because of its alkalinity.

Topaz also included a number of communal areas: a high school, two elementary schools, a 28-bed hospital, at least two churches, and a community garden. There was a cemetery as well, although it was never used. All 144 people who died in the camp were cremated and their ashes were held for burial until after the war. The camp was patrolled by 85–150 policemen, and was surrounded by a barbed wire fence. Manned watchtowers with searchlights were placed every .25 miles (400 m) surrounding the perimeter of the camp.

=== Daily life ===
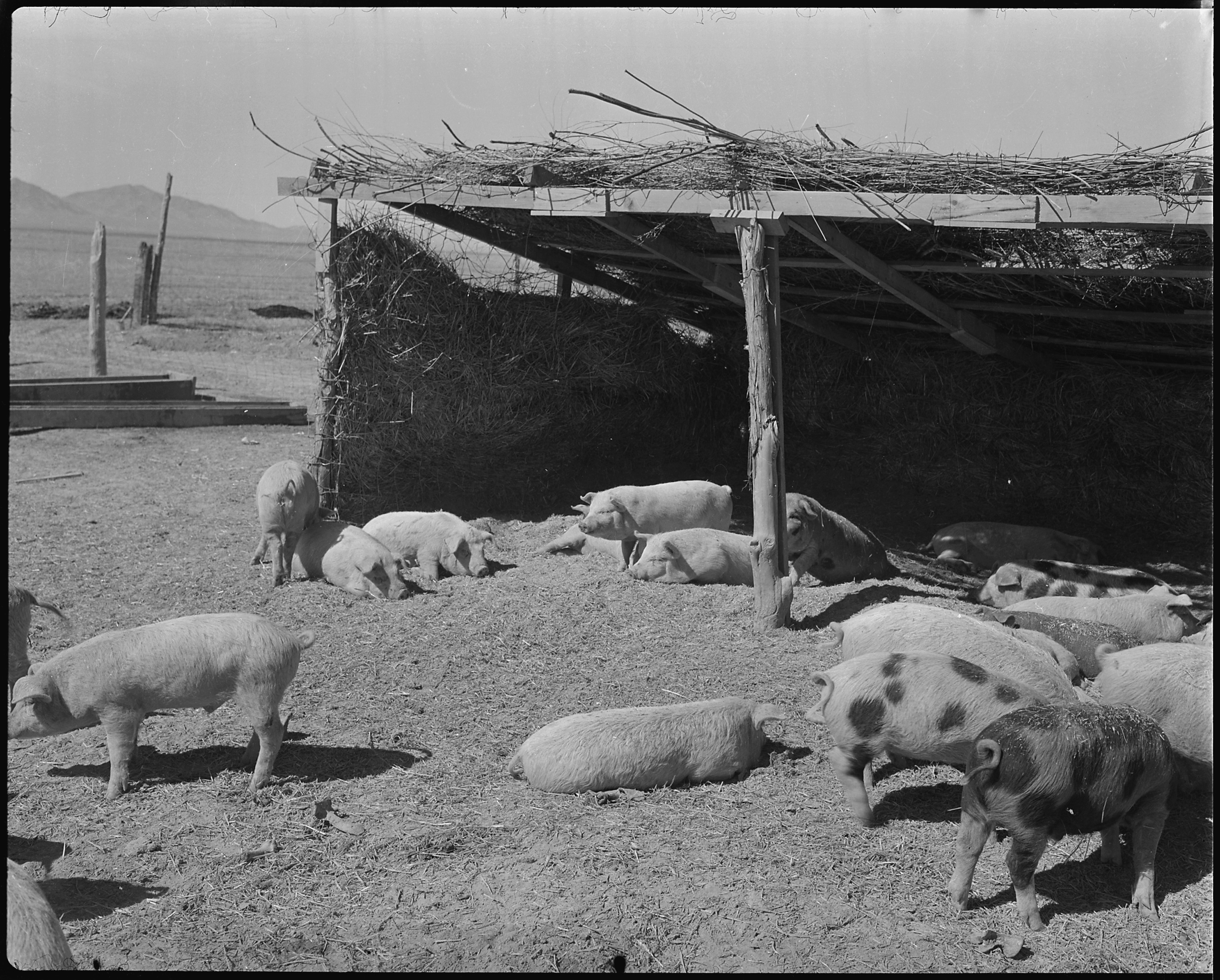
Hog farm where internees raised pork for the camp's kitchen

The camp was designed to be self-sufficient, and the majority of land within the camp was devoted to farming. Topaz inmates raised cattle, pigs, and chickens in addition to feed crops and vegetables. The vegetables were high-quality and won awards at the Millard County Fair. Due to harsh weather, poor soil, and short growing conditions, the camp was not able to supply all of its animal feed.

Topaz contained two elementary schools: Desert View Elementary and Mountain View Elementary. Topaz High School educated students grades 7–12, and there was also an adult education program. The schools were taught by a combination of local teachers and internees. They were under-equipped and overcrowded, but enthusiastic teachers did their best. Topaz High School developed a devoted community, with frequent reunions after internment ended, and a final reunion in 2012. Sports were popular within the schools as well as within the adult population, with sports including baseball, basketball, and sumo wrestling. Cultural associations sprung up throughout the camp. Topaz had a newspaper called the Topaz Times, a literary publication called Trek, and two libraries which eventually contained almost 7,000 items in both English and Japanese. Artist Chiura Obata led the Tanforan Art School at Topaz, offering art instruction to over 600 students. Internment rules usurped parental authority, and teenagers often ate meals with their friends and only joined their families to sleep at night. This combined with a lack of privacy made it difficult for parents to discipline and bond with their children, which contributed to teenage delinquency in the camp.

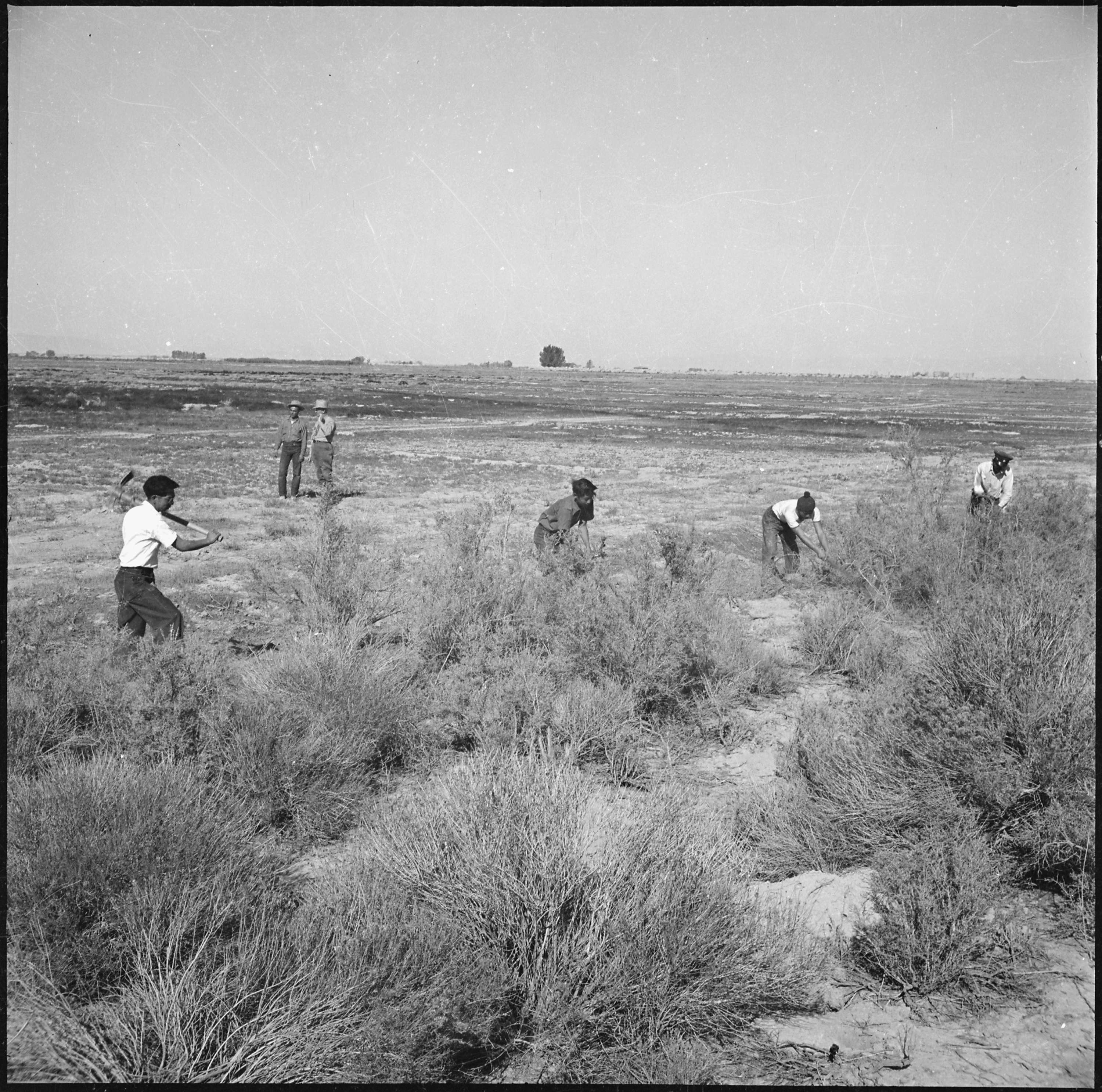
Internees clear land for agricultural use.

Some internees were permitted to leave the camp to find employment. In 1942, internees were able to get permission to leave the camp for employment in nearby Delta, where they filled labor shortages caused by the draft, mostly in agricultural labor. In 1943, over 500 internees obtained seasonal agricultural work outside the camp, with another 130 working in domestic and industrial jobs. Polling showed that a majority of Utahns supported this policy. One teacher at the camp art school, Chiura Obata, was allowed to leave Topaz to run classes at nearby universities and churches.

Internees were also sometimes permitted to leave the camp for recreation. A former Civilian Conservation Corps camp at Antelope Springs, in mountains 90 miles (144.8 km) to the west, was taken over as a recreation area for internees and camp staff, and two buildings from Antelope Springs were brought to the central area to be used as Buddhist and Christian churches. During a rock hunting expedition in the Drum Mountains, 16 miles (26 km) west of Topaz, Akio Uhihera and Yoshio Nishimoto discovered and excavated a 1,164 pounds (528 kg) rare iron meteorite, which the Smithsonian Institution acquired.

=== Camp politics ===
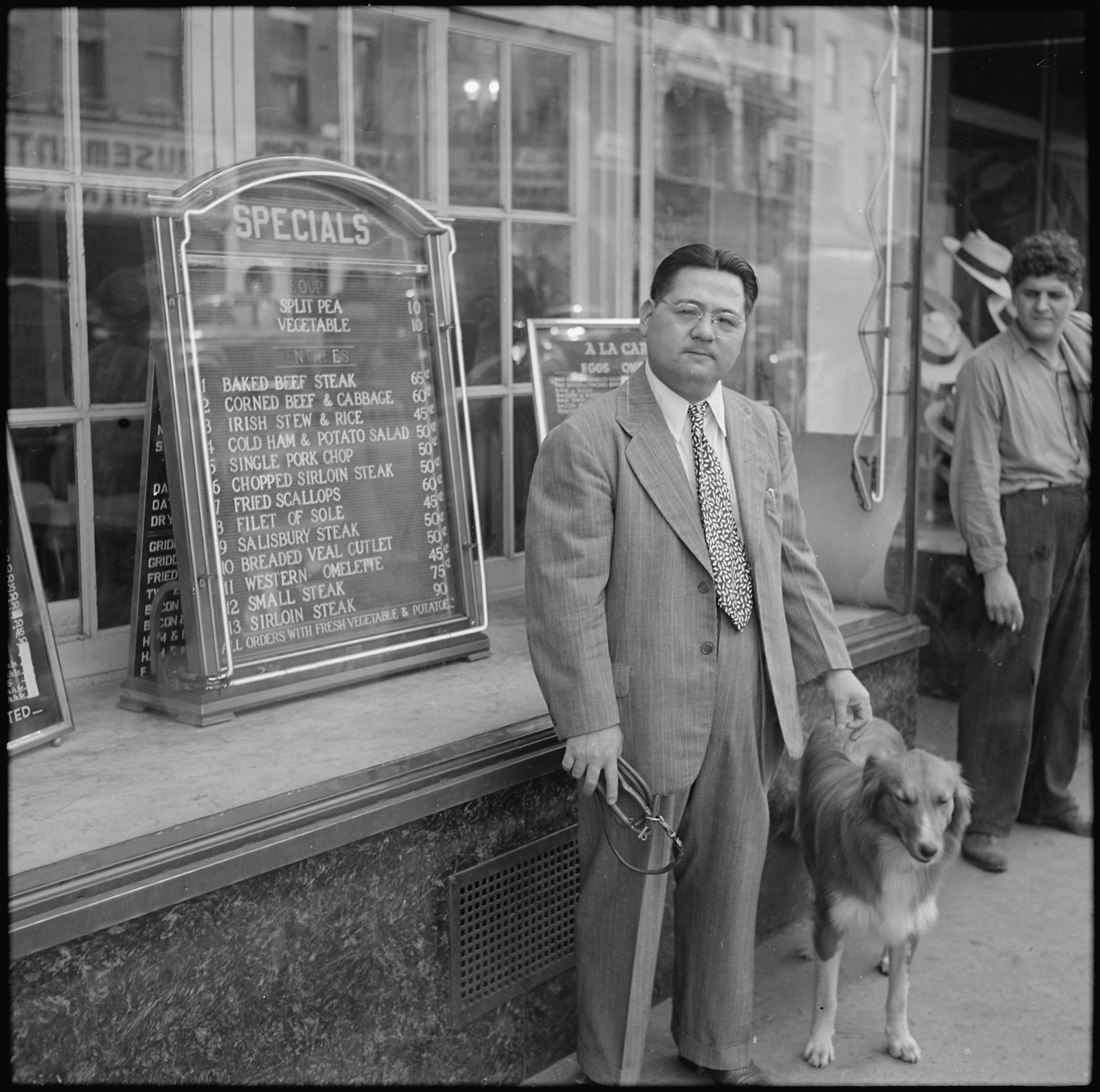
James Hatsuaki Wakasa and his dog in an undated photograph. A 63-year-old chef from San Francisco, Wakasa was shot and killed by a military sentry while walking his dog inside the barbed-wire fence.

In 1943, the War Relocation Authority (WRA) issued all adult internees a questionnaire assessing their level of Americanization. It was entitled "Application for Leave Clearance". Questions asked about what language they spoke most frequently, their religion, and recreational activities. Participating in judo and kendo were "Japanese" activities, while playing baseball or being Christian were considered "American". Two questions asked prisoners if they were willing to fight in the US Armed Forces and if they would swear allegiance to the United States and renounce loyalty to the Emperor of Japan. Many Japanese-born Issei, who were barred from attaining American citizenship, resented the second question, feeling that an affirmative answer would leave them effectively stateless. Some Issei volunteered to join the army, even though there was no enlistment procedure for non-citizens. Others objected on other political grounds. In Topaz, nearly a fifth of male residents answered "no" to the question about allegiance. Inmates expressed their anger through a few scattered assaults against other inmates who they perceived as too close to the administration. Chiura Obata was among those attacked, resulting in his immediate release for fear of further assaults. A reworded version of the questionnaire for Issei did not require them to renounce their loyalty to the emperor of Japan. In response to the questionnaires, some Nisei formed the Resident Council for Japanese American Civil Rights, which encouraged other prisoners to register for the draft if their civil rights were restored.

A military sentry fatally shot 63-year-old chef James Hatsuaki Wakasa on April 11, 1943, while he was walking his dog inside the camp fence. Internees went on strike protesting the death and surrounding secrecy. They held a large funeral for Wakasa as a way to express their outrage. In response, the administration determined that fears of subversive activity at the camp were largely without basis, and significantly relaxed security. The military decided that officers who had been at war in the Pacific would not be assigned to guard duty at Topaz. The guard who shot Wakasa was reassigned after being found not guilty of violating military law; this information was not given to internees.

Topaz internees Fred Korematsu and Mitsuye Endo challenged their internment in court. Korematsu's case was heard and rejected at the US Supreme Court (Korematsu v. United States), the largest case to challenge internment, while Endo's case was upheld. Chief Justice John Roberts repudiated and effectively overturned the Korematsu decision in his majority opinion in the 2018 case of Trump v. Hawaii. Korematsu would latter be awarded the Presidential Medal of Freedom by Bill Clinton, and Endo would be awarded the Presidential Citizens Medal by Joe Biden.

== After closing ==
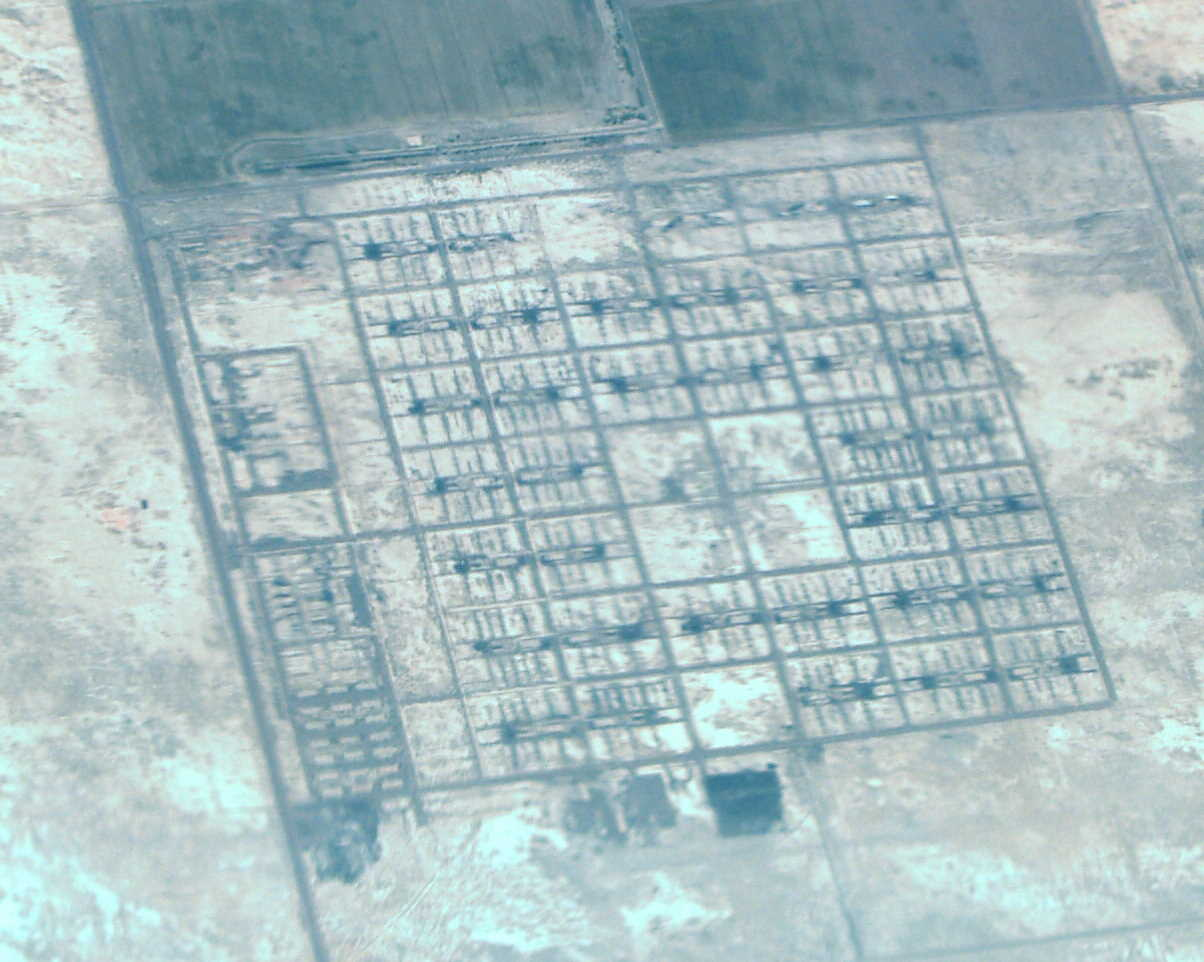
The remains of the camp as seen from 20,000 feet in 2009

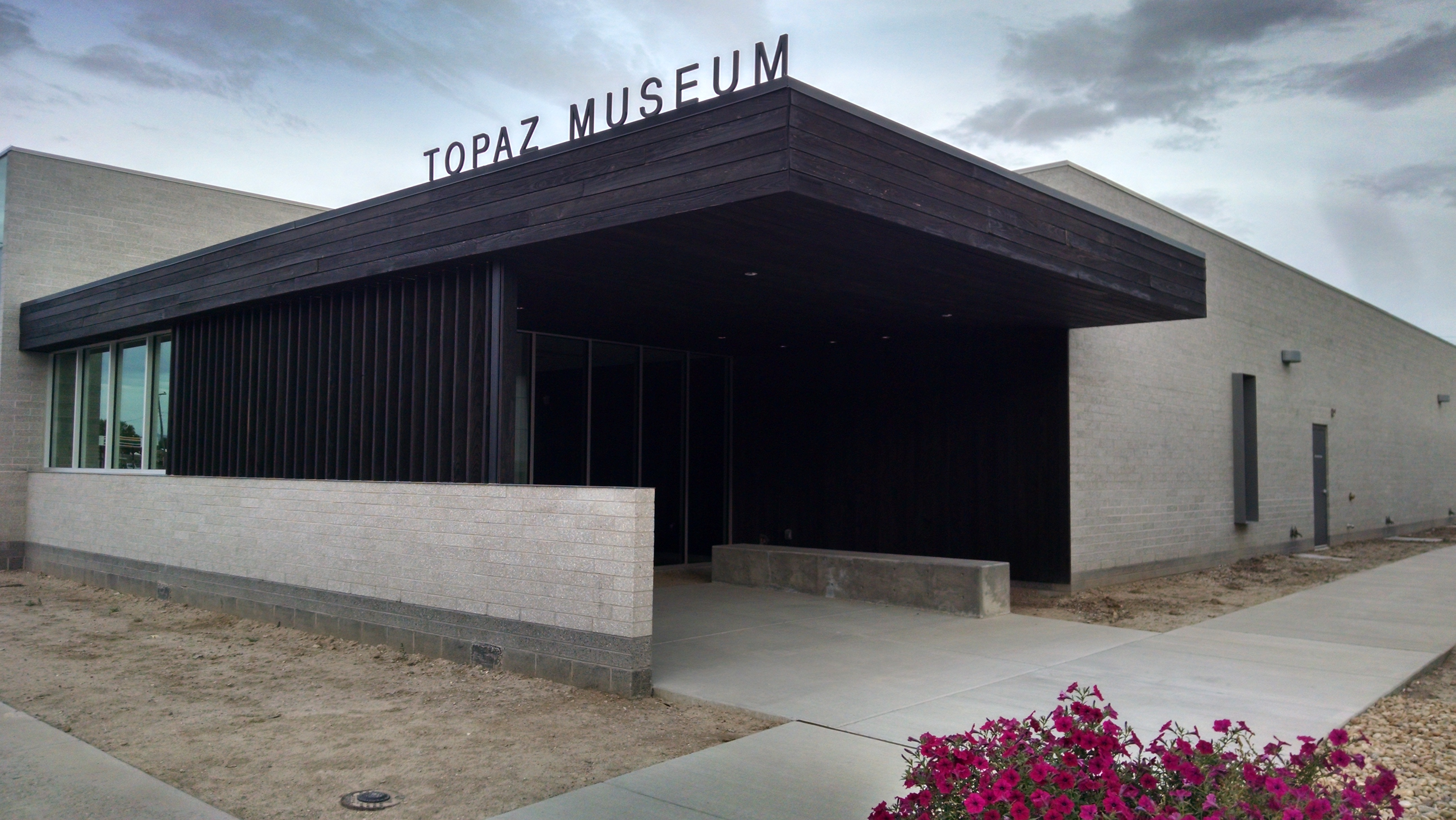
Topaz Museum in Delta, Utah

After Topaz was closed, the land was sold and most of the buildings were auctioned off, disassembled, and removed from the site. Even the water pipes and utility poles were sold. Numerous foundations, concrete-lined excavations and other ground-level features can be seen at the various sites, but few buildings remain, and natural vegetation has taken over most of the abandoned areas.

In 1976, the Japanese American Citizens League placed a monument on the northwestern corner of the central area. On March 29, 2007, United States Secretary of the Interior Dirk Kempthorne designated "Central Utah Relocation Center Site" a National Historic Landmark.

In 1982, Delta High School teacher Jane Beckwith and her journalism students began to study Topaz. She spearheaded the creation of the Topaz Museum Board in 1983, which oversaw the Topaz Museum, which initially shared space with the Great Basin Museum. Funding from the Japanese-American Confinement Sites organization enabled the Topaz Board to construct its own museum building in 2013. In 2015, the museum formally opened with an exhibition of art created at Topaz, entitled "When Words Weren't Enough: Works on Paper from Topaz, 1942–1945". The museum closed for remodeling in November 2016, and reopened in 2017 as a traditional museum focused on the history of Topaz. By 2017, the Topaz Museum and Board had purchased 634 of the 640 acres of the original internment site.

== In media ==
=== In film ===
Using a smuggled camera, Dave Tatsuno shot film of Topaz. The documentary Topaz uses film he shot from 1943 to 1945. This film was an inductee of the 1997 National Film Registry list, with the added distinction of being the second "home movie" to be included on the Registry and the only color footage of camp life.

Topaz War Relocation Center is the setting for the 2007 film American Pastime, a dramatization based on actual events, which tells the story of Nikkei baseball in the camps. A portion of the camp was duplicated for location shooting in Utah's Skull Valley, approximately 40 miles (64.4 km) west of Salt Lake City and 75 miles (120.7 km) north of the actual Topaz site. The film used some of Tatsuno's historical footage. In addition to Tatsuno's Topaz, Ken Verdoia made a 1987 documentary, also entitled Topaz.

=== In literature ===
Yoshiko Uchida's young adult novel Journey to Topaz (published in 1971) recounts the story of Yuki, a young Japanese American girl, whose world is disrupted when, shortly after Pearl Harbor, she and her family must leave their comfortable home in the Berkeley, California suburbs for the dusty barracks of Topaz. The book is largely based on Uchida's personal experiences: she and her family were interned at Topaz for three years.

Julie Otsuka's novel When the Emperor was Divine (published in 2002) tells the story of a family forced to relocate from Berkeley to Topaz in September 1942. Each of the novel's five chapters is told from the point of view of a different character. Critics praised the book's "precise but poetic evocation of the ordinary" and "ability to empathize".

In his poetry collection Topaz (published in 2013), Brian Komei Dempster examines the experience of his mother and her family, tying the history of persecution and internment to subsequent generations’ search for a 21st-century identity.

=== In art ===
Much of the art made by detainees at the camp depicted life there, and survives. Drawings and woodcuts by Chiura Obata and Matsusaburō (George) Hibi are among the most prominent. Some of it is collected in The Art of Gaman: Arts and Crafts from the Japanese American Internment Camps, 1942–1946 by Delphine Hirasuna, and has been exhibited in Topaz and at the Wight Art Gallery. In 2018, the Utah Museum of Fine Arts exhibited many Chiura Obata's works, including some made at Topaz.

== See also ==
- Bibliography of the Japanese American Internment during World War II
- Outline of Japanese American Internment during World War II
- Japanese American Internment
- List of Japanese American Confinement Sites
- List of inmates of Topaz War Relocation Center
