= Baseball Reliquary =

American baseball nonprofit organization

- Founded: 1996 (30 years ago)
- Founder: Terry Cannon
- Type: Nonprofit
- Purpose: Baseball history
- Location: Whittier, California, U.S.
- Region served: United States
- Members: 300+ (2019)
- Funding: Los Angeles County Department of Arts and Culture
- Website: baseballreliquary.org

The Baseball Reliquary is a nonprofit educational organization "dedicated to fostering an appreciation of American art and culture through the context of baseball history and to exploring the national pastime’s unparalleled creative possibilities." The Reliquary was founded in 1996 in Monrovia, California, and since 2015 has been located at Whittier College in Whittier, California. The organization is funded in part by a grant from the Los Angeles County Department of Arts and Culture. Since 1999, the Reliquary has maintained an “alternate hall-of-fame” called the Shrine of the Eternals.

== History and mission ==
The Baseball Reliquary is a nonprofit educational institution that is "dedicated to fostering an appreciation of American art and culture through the context of baseball history and to exploring the national pastime’s unparalleled creative possibilities." The Reliquary was founded in 1996 by Terry Cannon, a creative artist and assistant school librarian who describes himself as “meek and mild-mannered [on the outside] … a rabble-rouser and non-conformist [at heart].” In its early years, the Reliquary had no physical home; instead it collaborated with local institutions including public and university libraries as well as the Jackie Robinson Community Center in Pasadena, California.

In January 2015, the Reliquary found a permanent home for its collections and events with the opening of the Institute for Baseball Studies at Whittier College in Whittier, California. Housed on the third floor of the College’s Mendenhall building, the Institute is open to students and the public for research and viewing of the Reliquary’s growing collection.

=== Awards and exhibitions ===
Beginning in 1999, the Reliquary created a hall-of-fame style historical commemoration of baseball notables called the Shrine of the Eternals. Rather than focusing on statistical accomplishments as does the National Baseball Hall of Fame and Museum in Cooperstown, New York, the Shrine “seek[s] out aspects of this history that have been overlooked or have not been explored in depth as well as players and others in baseball who have had unconventional careers.” The Reliquary and its Shrine have been described as “a haven for legends like Marvin Miller and Spaceman Lee, umpires like Emmett Ashford and Pam Postema … mostly renegades who did not meet the precise standards of the [National] Baseball Hall of Fame.” Some view the Shrine of the Eternals as a more welcome recognition of their contributions to baseball than even the Hall of Fame.

In 2013, documentary filmmaker Jon Leonoudakis released a 69-minute film about the Reliquary titled Not Exactly Cooperstown. The film premiered at the 8th Annual Baseball Film Festival at the National Baseball Hall of Fame and Museum in Cooperstown on September 29, 2013. The film was also featured at the St. Louis International Film Festival in November 2014.

In 2001, the Reliquary began recognizing “distinguished service by a baseball fan” with the Hilda Award, named for famed Brooklyn Dodgers fan Hilda Chester. In 2002, the Tony Salin Memorial Award was established “to honor individuals for their work in preserving baseball history.” Each of these honors is awarded annually.

The Reliquary organizes and presents artistic and historical exhibitions relating to baseball each year. Throughout its history, the Reliquary has held exhibitions on varied topics relating to the cultural impact of baseball, including:

- "Legacies: Baseball from Flatbush to the City of Angels" (2004), a variety of artistic interpretations of the 1958 move of the Brooklyn Dodgers to Los Angeles
- “Another Trip in Baseball’s Time Machine: Photography at the Field of Dreams” (2013), a photographic exhibition highlighting the relationship between photography and baseball
- “A Swinging Centennial: Jackie Robinson at 100” (2019), a musical event that featured a performance of “Stealin’ Home,” Bobby Bradford’s tribute to Jackie Robinson, commissioned by the Reliquary

== Award recipients ==
=== Shrine of the Eternals ===
Since 1999, members of the Baseball Reliquary have elected individuals to their "Shrine of the Eternals." The Shrine is similar in concept to the annual elections held at the Baseball Hall of Fame, but differs philosophically in that statistical accomplishment is not a criterion for election. Rather, the Shrine’s annual ballot is composed of individuals—from the obscure to the well known—who have altered the baseball world in ways that supersede statistics. The definition of "individuals" is not restricted to humans; the 2017 induction class included the Peanuts character Charlie Brown. The Baseball Reliquary lists the criteria for election to the Shrine of the Eternals as:

- the distinctiveness of play (good or bad)
- the uniqueness of character and personality
- the imprint that the individual has made upon the baseball landscape

Members of the Reliquary receive a ballot of 50 candidates for the Shrine, and the top three vote-getters by percentage are installed. Balloting is conducted annually, except for a pause around the COVID-19 pandemic. As of 2019 balloting, there were more than 300 voting members.

Inductees through the class of 2025 (persons marked in bold are also Hall of Fame inductees as of 2026):

- Jim Abbott (2003)
- **Dick Allen** (2004)
- Felipe Alou (2025)
- Roger Angell (2010)
- Emmett Ashford (2008)
- Dusty Baker (2024)
- Billy Beane (2019)
- Moe Berg (2000)
- Sy Berger (2015)
- **Yogi Berra** (2007)
- Steve Bilko (2015)
- Ila Borders (2003)
- Jim Bouton (2001)
- Jim Brosnan (2007)
- Charlie Brown (2017)
- Bill Buckner (2008)
- Glenn Burke (2015)
- **Roberto Clemente** (2004)
- Bob Costas (2022)
- Steve Dalkowski (2009)
- **Dizzy Dean** (2014)
- Rod Dedeaux (2005)
- Sean Doolittle (2024)
- Jim Eisenreich (2009)
- Dock Ellis (1999)
- Nancy Faust (2018)
- Eddie Feigner (2013)
- Lisa Fernandez (2019)
- Mark "The Bird" Fidrych (2002)
- Curt Flood (1999)
- **Rube Foster** (2022)
- Ted Giannoulas (2011)
- **Josh Gibson** (2006)
- Kirk Gibson (2025)
- Jim "Mudcat" Grant (2012)
- Pete Gray (2011)
- Arnold Hano (2016)
- William "Dummy" Hoy (2004)
- Bo Jackson (2016)
- Shoeless Joe Jackson (2002)
- Bill James (2007)
- Dr. Frank Jobe (2012)
- Tommy John (2018)
- W.P. Kinsella (2025)
- Bill "Spaceman" Lee (2000)
- Ron LeFlore (2025)
- **Effa Manley** (2024)
- Roger Maris (2009)
- **Marvin Miller** (2003)
- **Minnie Miñoso** (2002)
- Manny Mota (2013)
- Don Newcombe (2016)
- Kim Ng (2024)
- Lefty O’Doul (2013)
- **Buck O’Neil** (2008)
- **Satchel Paige** (2001)
- Max Patkin (2022)
- Jimmy Piersall (2001)
- Pam Postema (2000)
- J. R. Richard (2019)
- **Jackie Robinson** (2005)
- Rachel Robinson (2014)
- Lester Rodney (2005)
- Pete Rose (2010)
- Vin Scully (2017)
- Rusty Staub (2018)
- **Casey Stengel** (2010)
- Luis Tiant (2012)
- Bob Uecker (2017)
- Fernando Valenzuela (2006)
- **Bill Veeck Jr.** (1999)
- Maury Wills (2011)
- Kenichi Zenimura (2006)
- Don Zimmer (2014)

=== Hilda Award ===
Named in memory of legendary Brooklyn Dodgers baseball fan Hilda Chester (1897–1978), the Hilda Award recognizes distinguished service by a baseball fan. The award is an old cowbell, Hilda Chester’s signature noisemaker. The Hilda is awarded annually, on the Shrine of the Eternals induction day.

Recipients (as of 2019):

- Rea Wilson (2001)
- Seth Hawkins (2002)
- Ruth Roberts (2003)
- Jennie Reiff (2004)
- David Fletcher (2005)
- Bill Murray (2006)
- Cass Sapir (2007)
- John Adams (2008)
- Bob Colleary (2009)
- Sister Mary Assumpta Zabas (2010)
- Chris Erskine (2011)
- Arnold Hano (2012)
- Emma Amaya (2013)
- Jerry Pritikin (2014)
- Tom Keefe (2015)
- Tom Derry (2016)
- Cam Perron (2017)
- Bart Wilhelm (2018)
- Ralph Carhart (2019)

=== Tony Salin Memorial Award ===
In 2002, the Reliquary established the Tony Salin Memorial Award, named after baseball historian and researcher Tony Salin (1952–2001), to honor individuals for their work in preserving baseball history.

Recipients (as of 2019):

- Peter Golenbock (2002)
- David Nemec (2003)
- Bill Weiss (2004)
- Dick Beverage (2005)
- Kerry Yo Nakagawa (2006)
- Mark Rucker (2007)
- David W. Smith (2008)
- Mike Shannon (2009)
- Stew Thornley (2010)
- Paul Dickson (2011)
- Dave Kelly (2012)
- Steve Bandura (2013)
- Jerry Cohen (2014)
- Gary Joseph Cieradkowski (2015)
- Neetalie Williams (2016)
- Richard Santillan (2017)
- Ross Altman (2018)
- Bob Busser (2019)
- Alex Belth (2020)
- Bob Busser (2022)
- Phil S. Dixon (2026)

== See also ==
- Nisei Baseball Research Project
