= John Adams (drummer) =

Cleveland Indians superfan (1951–2023)

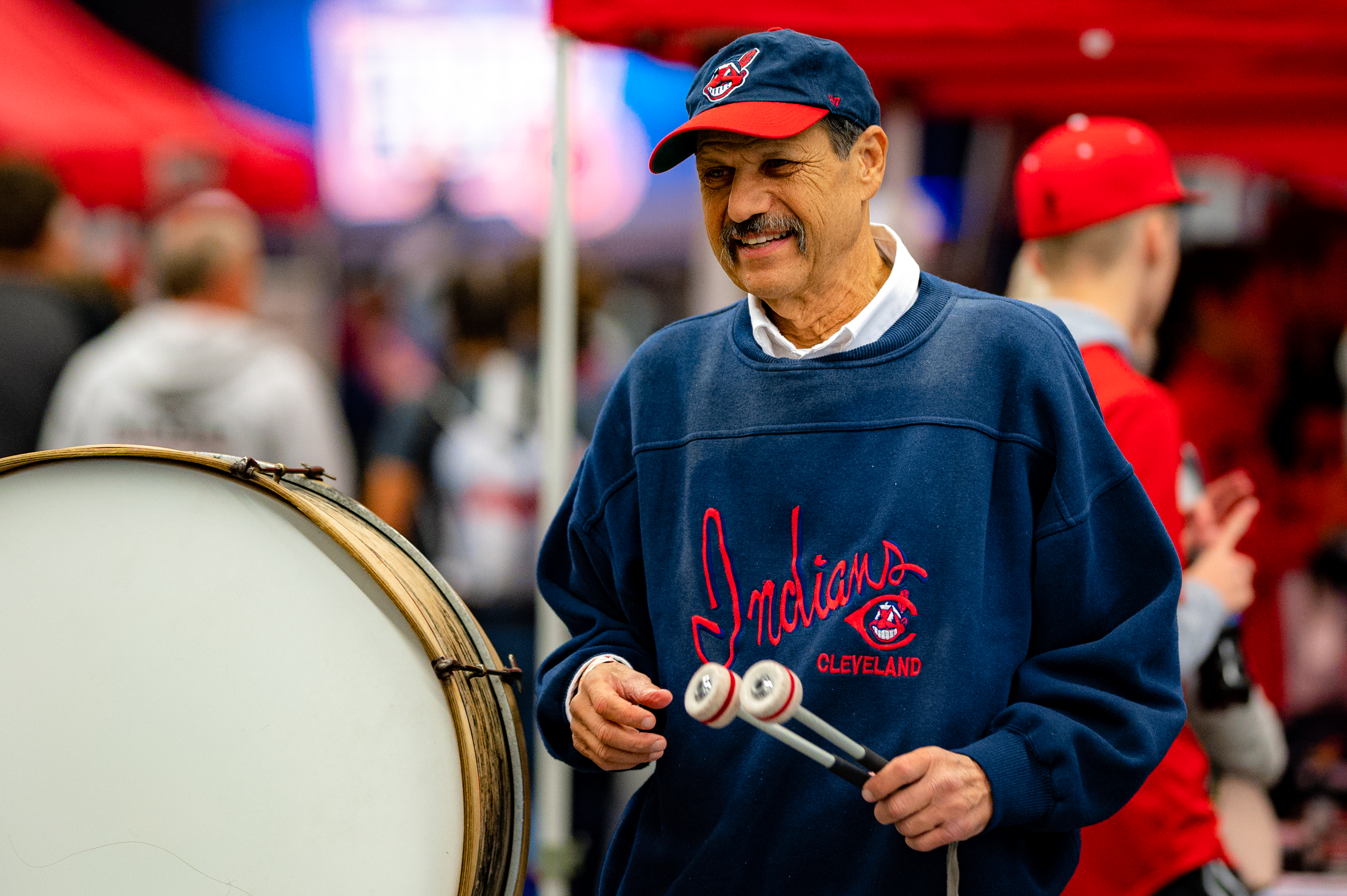
- Adams in 2020
- Born: October 9, 1951; Cleveland, Ohio, U.S.
- Died: January 30, 2023 (aged 71); Cleveland, Ohio, U.S.
- Education: Cleveland State University
- Years active: 1973–2019
- Known for: Drumming at Cleveland Indians games
- Spouse: Kathleen Murray (m. 1978, divorced)

John Joseph Adams (October 9, 1951 – January 30, 2023) was an American who was regarded as a superfan of the Cleveland Indians, a Major League Baseball team based in Cleveland, Ohio. Adams played his bass drum in the bleacher seats during nearly every Indians home game from August 24, 1973 against the Texas Rangers through 2019, which brought him positive recognition from the Indians and other organizations. He was involved in several ceremonial first pitches, and the team gave away bobbleheads with his likeness.

== Drumming ==
Adams first drummed at an Indians game on August 24, 1973, at Cleveland Stadium. Twenty-one years old at the time, he stated that he brought his bass drum to that first game because he wanted to add to the noise of "seat banging", a tradition at Cleveland Stadium in which fans would bang folding seats against their bases during tense moments in the game. But Adams preferred to sit in the bleachers, where there were no seats to bang.

During the game, Bob Sudyk, a reporter for the Cleveland Press, interviewed Adams and asked if he was going to drum again at the following game. Adams said no, but Sudyk wrote in his article that he would. According to Adams, "not to make a liar out of Bob, I showed up with my drum, and then I came to the next game and the next game and the next game." The Indians' promotions director at the time, Jackie York, also approached Adams and asked him to play at every game. Adams formally declined but continued to attend games with his drum.

From then on, Adams sat in the highest bleacher seat in right-center field with his bass drum at Cleveland Municipal Stadium through the 1993 season. He missed only 37 home games in 47 seasons. Adams played at the old stadium until October 1993, when the Indians played their last game there. The following spring he moved with the team to its new ballpark, Jacobs Field (renamed Progressive Field in 2008). At the new ballpark, there were no bleachers in right-center field, so he had to set up in left-center field, where he commented that it was a different view for him. Adams played the drum at his 3,000th game on April 27, 2011.

Adams continued to use the same 26-inch (66 cm)-wide bass drum he began with in 1973. He stated that he bought it earlier on the same day he began bringing it to games, as part of a set for $25 either at a garage sale or through a "swap-and-shop publication". It had the same head on the side of the drum that Adams did not beat, but Adams stated that he would replace the other side about twice a year and also go through about three sets of mallets each year. During games, Adams tended to drum at particular moments: when the Indians took the field at the beginning of the game, if the Indians had runners in scoring position, if the Indians were tied or trailing near the end of the game, or if they were winning at the top of the ninth inning. Because of his drumming, Adams became a celebrity and he was nicknamed Big Chief Boom-Boom by Indians radio announcer Herb Score.

Adams drummed until the end of the 2019 season. No fans could attend any major league games during the 2020 season because of the COVID-19 pandemic, and due to health issues, Adams was unable to attend any games in 2021 or 2022, the last seasons during his lifetime.

=== Recognition ===
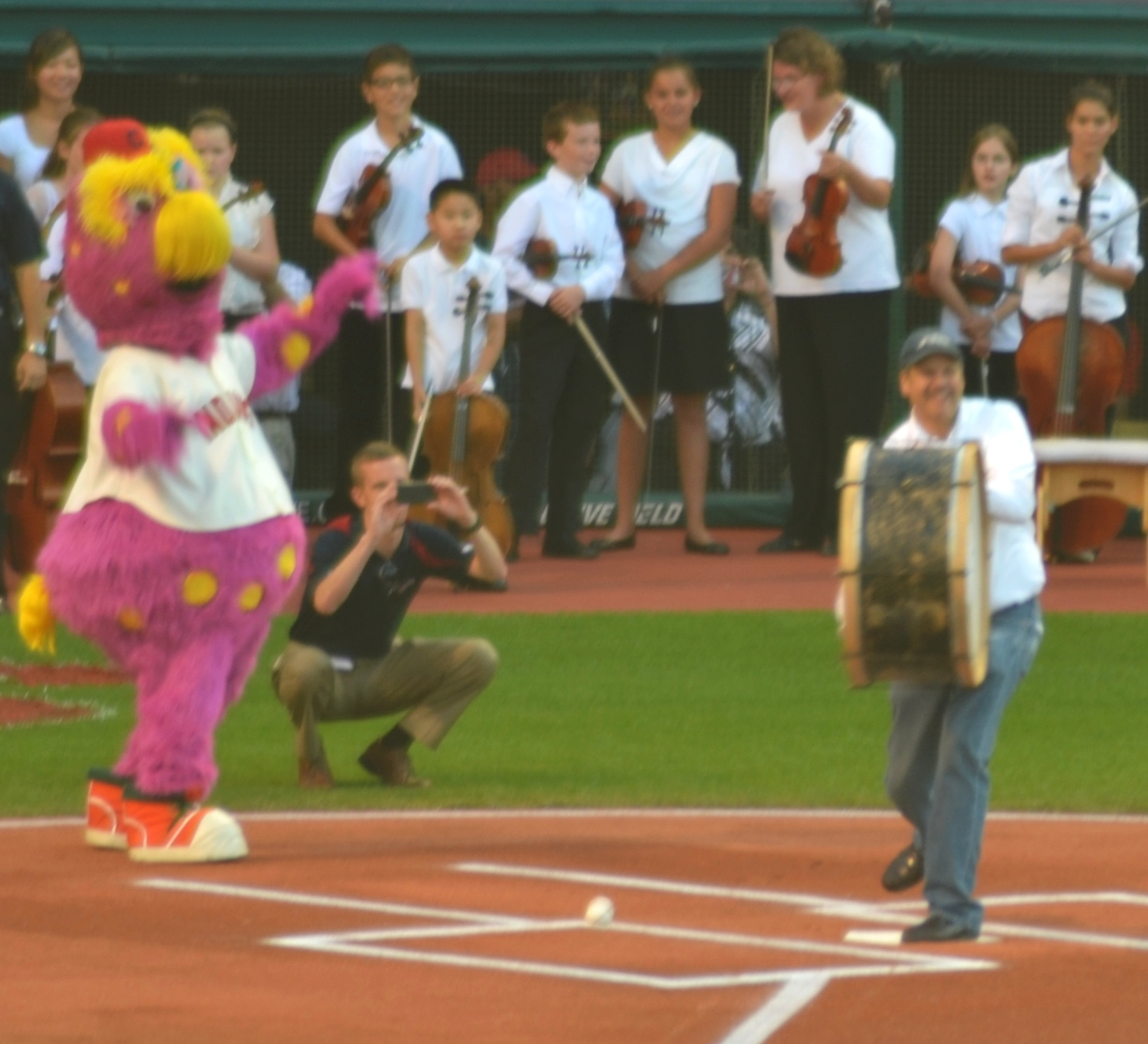
Adams using his drum to hit a ceremonial first pitch in 2013

Adams was recognized by the Cleveland Guardians and other organizations for his long commitment to the team. On October 4, 2007, he threw out the ceremonial first pitch for the Indians' first game in the 2007 American League Division Series, against the New York Yankees. After Adams drummed at his 3,000th game on April 27, 2011, the Indians celebrated it the following Saturday, on April 30, 2011, by incorporating Adams in the ceremonial first pitch and putting on a pregame parade featuring Adams's fellow Indians fans carrying bongos, snares, and plastic toy drums. For the ceremonial first pitch, Adams swung at the ball with his drum from home plate after it was thrown by former Indians player Joe Charboneau. On August 24, 2022, the 49th anniversary of when he started drumming at Cleveland baseball games, the team—now renamed the Guardians—announced that Adams had been inducted into the Cleveland Guardians Distinguished Hall of Fame, and that a bronze replica of his drum, attached to his seat, would be on display in their stadium.

By 2009, the team gave Adams two complimentary season tickets for him and his drum, although Adams continued to buy two additional season tickets himself. In 2006, the Indians gave out bobblehead dolls depicting Adams. Instead of having a movable head, his bobblehead had arms that moved up and down.

In 2008, he won the Hilda Award, which is awarded annually by The Baseball Reliquary "to recognize distinguished service to the game by a baseball fan" and is named in memory of Hilda Chester, a dedicated fan of the Brooklyn Dodgers. In April 2012, Great Lakes Brewing Company, a Cleveland-based brewery and brewpub, released a product called Rally Drum Red Ale in honor of Adams and Opening Day.

Adams also had a plaque located by his seat, on which he was described as the team's "#1 Fan".

== Personal life and death ==
John Joseph Adams was born in Cleveland in 1951. He attended both Saint Ignatius High School in Cleveland and Parma Senior High School in Parma, Ohio, where he played bass drum in band before graduating from high school in 1969. In 1975, he graduated from Cleveland State University. Three years later, he married Kathleen Murray, whom he met at a game; they later divorced.

Adams worked on computer systems for AT&T until being laid off in October 2016. In 1978, he began volunteering at Cleveland State University, where he taught an aquatics class for people with disabilities. Adams also volunteered his time as a member of the Kiwanis service club and the community emergency response team in his hometown and taught cardiopulmonary resuscitation and water safety. He lived in the Cleveland suburb of Brecksville, Ohio.

Adams suffered from health issues beginning in December 2020, including emergency triple bypass surgery and thyroid issues. He died in Cleveland on January 30, 2023, at age 71. His funeral mass was held at the Cathedral of St. John the Evangelist in downtown Cleveland on February 4, 2023. Adams willed his bass drum to the team, and they sent a pair of his mallets to the National Baseball Hall of Fame and Museum in Cooperstown, New York.

On August 24, 2023, the 50th anniversary of the first game Adams drummed at, the team announced that the bleachers at Progressive Field would be named for Adams starting in the 2024 season.
