= Ōsumi =

Ōsumi can stand for:

- Ōsumi Province, a former province of Japan
- Ōsumi Peninsula
- Ōsumi Islands, an archipelago at the northern end of the Ryukyu Islands
- Ōsumi (satellite), the first Japanese satellite
- Ōsumi class LST, a class of Japanese amphibious transport dock

== People with the surname ==
- Masaaki Ōsumi (born 1934), Japanese anime director
- Baron Mineo Ōsumi, a Japanese admiral
- Paul Osumi, a Japanese Christian minister
- Yoshinori Ohsumi, Japanese cell biologist and 2016 Nobel laureate in Physiology or Medicine
