= Jerry Pritikin =

American baseball fan

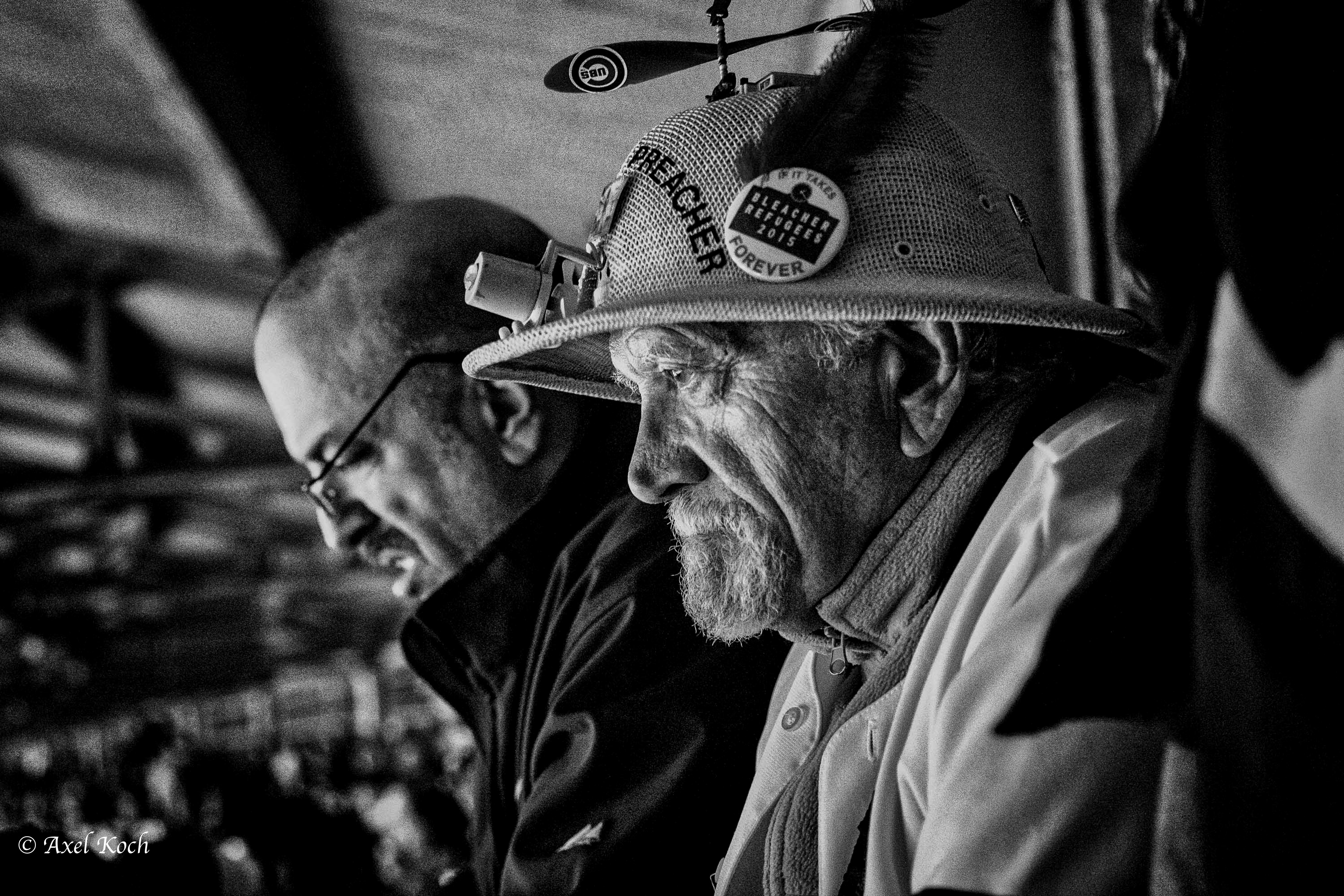
©Axel Koch

Jerry Pritikin is a lifelong Chicago Cubs fan known as the Bleacher Preacher.

== Early life ==
Pritikin became a Cubs fan in 1945 at the age of eight, when the Cubs were in the World Series and he begged his father to take him to a game. While denying his request, his father did promise to take him the next time the Cubs made it to the Series (a feat the Cubs would not achieve until 2016). Pritikin started going to Cubs games with his brothers and sisters. In 1960 he moved to San Francisco, where he worked as a photographer, selling his photos to wire services and local newspapers. He started attending baseball games at Candlestick Park, where he gained notoriety as a Cubs fan. In 1981, he became a paid consultant for a production of Bleacher Bums, coaching the cast on how Chicago Cubs fans acted.

== The Bleacher Preacher ==
Pritikin moved back to Chicago in 1985 and began to regularly attend Cubs games at Wrigley Field. He admired the Cubs fan known as "Slow Motion Happy" in the mid-40s and decided to put together his own character, which was later called the "Bleacher Preacher". The Bleacher Preacher became famous around Chicago for his routine.

=== Routine ===
During Cubs games at the "Friendly Confines," Pritikin sat in the bleachers and attempted to convert fans of opposing teams as the "Bleacher Preacher".

=== Attire ===
As the Bleacher Preacher, Pritikin wore a solar-powered propeller pith helmet. He carried around a life-sized voodoo doll dressed in the uniforms of various visiting teams. Pritikin also carried "The Ten Cub-Mandments", a sign fashioned after the Ten Commandments.

In 2014, Pritikin was named the recipient of the Hilda Award, given by the Baseball Reliquary in Pasadena, Ca. The award was named after Hilda Chester, the fabled fan of the Brooklyn Dodgers, known for her cowbell. The award is given to fans who have contributed to the game of baseball.

== In popular media ==
Pritikin is largely the subject of the Lonnie Wheeler book Bleachers. Edgar Lenze interviewed Pritikin for his documentary about Chicago Cubs fans entitled Keep the Faith. During the 1980 his name and likeness often appeared in newspapers. Broadcaster Harry Caray once called Pritikin "the world's greatest Cubs fan".
