= Bea Chester =

American baseball player

- Third base
- Born: c.1921 Brooklyn, New York, US
- Bats: Right Throws: Right

Teams
- South Bend Blue Sox (1943); Rockford Peaches (1944)

Career highlights and awards
- Women in Baseball – AAGPBL Permanent Display at Baseball Hall of Fame and Museum (1988)

Bea Chester (born c.1921) was a utility infielder who played in the All-American Girls Professional Baseball League (AAGPBL). She batted and threw right-handed.

A native of Brooklyn, New York, Chester was one of the original South Bend Blue Sox founding members of the All-American Girls Professional Baseball League in its 1943 inaugural season. She served primarily as a backup at third base for Lois Florreich, hitting a .190 batting average in 18 games.

Chester opened 1944 with the Rockford Peaches, being used mostly as a pinch hitter and defensive replacement. She batted .214 that year, while collecting a .313 on-base percentage in 11 games.

Chester could not be reached after leaving the league in 1944. She was a daughter of Hilda Chester, a mid-20th century superfan of the Brooklyn Dodgers.

Chester is part of Women in Baseball, a permanent display based at the Baseball Hall of Fame and Museum in Cooperstown, New York, which was unveiled in 1988 to honor the entire All-American Girls Professional Baseball League.

== Career statistics ==
Batting

GP	AB	R	H	2B	3B	HR	RBI	SB	TB	BB	SO	BA	OBP	SLG
29	100	10	20	2	2	0	9	7	26	13	16	.200	.292	.260

Fielding

GP	PO	A	E	TC	DP	FA
17	25	31	17	73	1	.767
