= Exeter Union High School =

Location
- 505 Rocky Hill Dr. Exeter, California; United States
- 36.29785°N 119.13497°W

Information
- Type: Public
- Established: 1908
- Principal: Robert Mayo
- Faculty: 43
- Teaching staff: 38.10 (FTE)
- Grades: High school (9-12)
- Enrollment: 900 (2023-2024)
- Student to teacher ratio: 23.62
- Campus: Suburban
- Colors: Blue, Gold
- Mascot: Monarch
- Newspaper: The Foothills Sun-Gazette

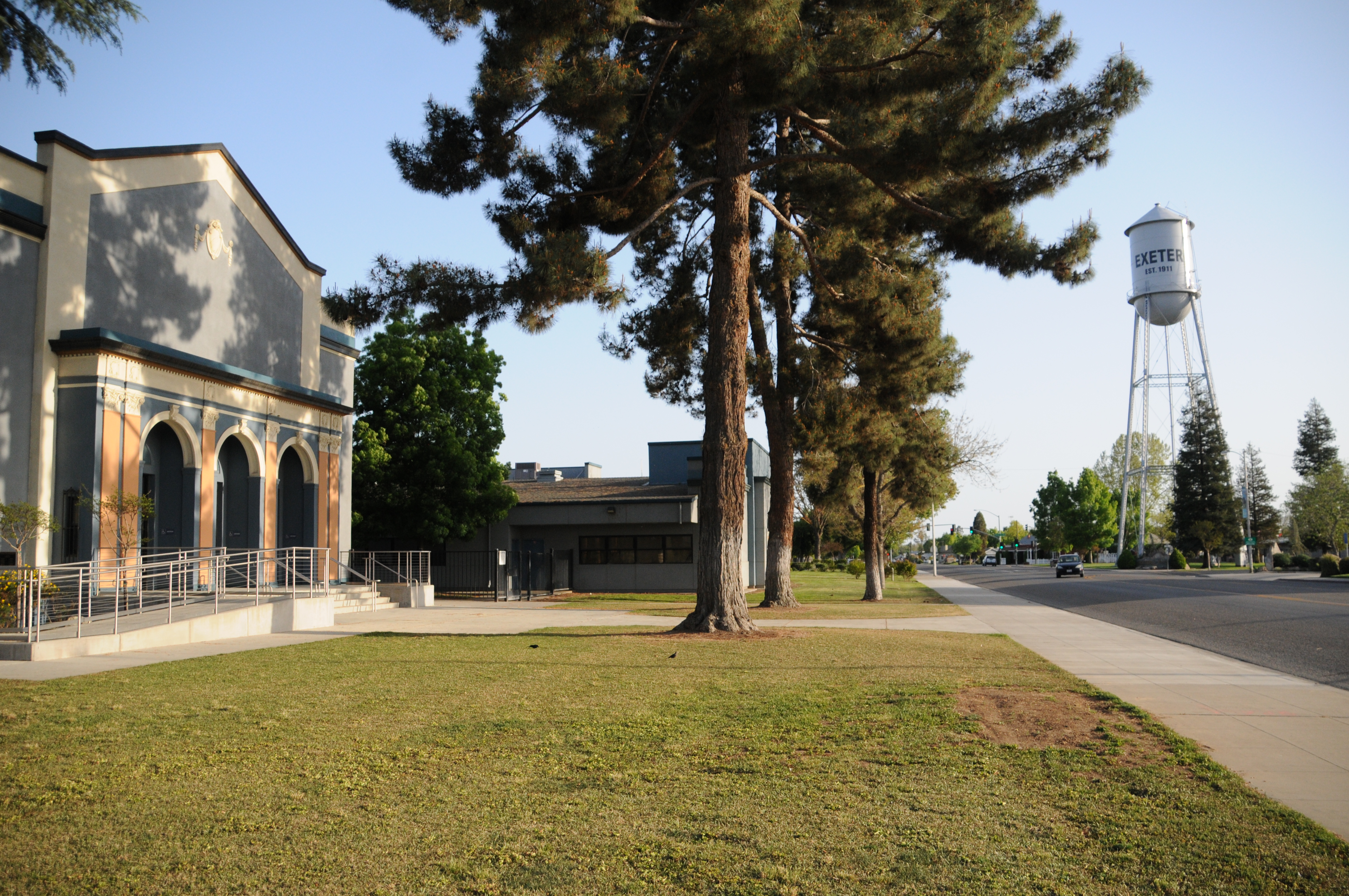
Exeter Union High School

Exeter Union High School is located in Exeter, California, in Tulare County.

== Academics ==
Exeter Union High School currently offers a curriculum that prepares its students for higher education, vocational training, and direct entry into the workforce. In 2009 it was declared a California Distinguished School.

== Notable alumni ==
- Floyd Collier (1924–2002), professional football player
- Satoshi Hirayama (born 1931), professional baseball player
- Brad Mills (born 1957), professional baseball player, coach, and manager
- Adam Pettyjohn (born 1977), professional baseball player
- Jeriome Robertson (1977–2010), professional baseball player
- Stan RupertClass of 1937, went on to a prominent scientific career as one of the founding fathers of DNA repair research
- Taelor Hire, Class of (2012-2018), won the Miss Tulare County 2019 went on to compete in Ms. California
- Olivia Harden Class of class of (2012-2018), Miss Tulare County 2022 Competed in Ms. California runner up.
