= Arnold Hano =

American writer and editor (1922–2021)

- Born: Arnold Philip Hano; March 2, 1922; New York City, US
- Died: October 24, 2021 (aged 99); Laguna Beach, California, US
- Education: DeWitt Clinton High School (1937)
- Alma mater: Long Island University (1941)
- Occupations: Book editor; novelist; biographer; freelance journalist
- Spouses: Marjorie Mosheim (1942–?; divorced); Bonnie Abraham (June 30, 1951–his death)
- Children: Stephen A. Hano; Susan C. Hano; (both with Mosheim); Laurel C. Ingham, née Hano (with Abraham)
- Relatives: Alfred (brother); Clara (née Millhauser); Alfred Barnard Hano; (parents)
- Writing career
- Pen name: Gil Dodge, Matthew Gant, Ad Gordon, Mike Heller
- Period: 1941–1942, 1946–2021
- Genres: Crime fiction, Westerns, film novelizations, travel literature, advocacy journalism
- Military career
- Branch: United States Army
- Service years: 1942–1946
- Rank: Corporal
- Unit: 7th Infantry Division
- Conflicts: Aleutian Islands Campaign, Battle of Kwajalein

Arnold Philip Hano (March 2, 1922 – October 24, 2021) was an American editor, novelist, biographer and journalist, best known for his non-fiction work A Day in the Bleachers, a critically acclaimed eyewitness account of Game 1 of the 1954 World Series, centered on its pivotal play, Willie Mays' famous catch and throw. The author of several sports biographies, and frequent contributor to such publications as The New York Times, Sport, Sports Illustrated, and TV Guide, Hano was, in 1963, both a Hillman Prize winner and NSSA's Magazine Sportswriter of the Year. He was also Baseball Reliquary's 2012 Hilda Award recipient and a 2016 inductee into its Shrine of the Eternals.

== Early life and education ==
Hano was born in Manhattan on March 2, 1922. His father, Alfred Barnard Hano, worked as a lawyer and was employed as a salesman during the Great Depression; his mother, Clara (Millhauser), was a housewife. Hano spent his pre-school years in northern Manhattan's Washington Heights, in close proximity to both the Polo Grounds and Yankee Stadium. A Yankee fan at four, Hano responded to New York's loss in the 1926 World Series by switching his allegiance from the Yankees to the Giants, (Note: This defection did not extend to players: Hano remained an avid fan of Babe Ruth. I shifted in 1926 to the Giants, and 1927 began the Yankee dynasty that may have been one of the greatest teams ever. But I didn't really care because I still remained a Babe Ruth fan. I loved watching him hit home runs. [...] Ruth was a great all-around ballplayer. [...] People think of him as a fat truck, but he could run. He ran gracefully with short steps, funny for a guy who was 6'3" [191 cm] and 210 [95 kg] before he starting getting fat. [...] Very graceful. He didn't have a strong arm. Odd thing is, he didn't have a powerful arm, he had a very accurate arm. [...] He would always throw to the right base. We say that about most outfielders. Ruth always threw to the right base. DiMaggio always threw to the right base. The others maybe did, maybe didn't. Mays most of the time threw to the right base, but Ruth always threw to the right base. [...] The two most influential ballplayers that I've ever been involved with, that I've ever seen, are Ruth and Jackie Robinson. They both changed the game dramatically.) where it remained lifelong. That same year, his family moved from Manhattan to the Bronx for more than a decade comprising his formative years.

By age three, Hano had learned to read under the tutelage of his six-and-a-half-year-old brother, Alfred Jr. By the time he was eight, Hano was writing news stories for his brother's mimeographed weekly, The Montgomery Avenue News, albeit stories paraphrased from published newspaper articles. Before long, he grew tired of recycling other people's ideas; once again, his brother encouraged him:

So I invented a cop who would always fall to his knees when he shot the bad guy and I called it Sitting Bull. It was my first pun. [...] I did about six or seven of these episodic things. I was eight years old, writing the equivalent of a novel for a street newspaper that we sold for a nickel a copy, door-to-door.

Hano attended DeWitt Clinton High School, graduating in 1937, and started that fall at Long Island University's Brooklyn campus. However, his initial plan to pursue a career in medicine was diverted:

One day I wandered into the newspaper office, and they were laughing. I didn't know you were allowed to have fun. They were enjoying themselves, so I changed from a science major to an English journalism major in my sophomore year. I became the sports editor of the college weekly in my junior year, and senior year I was editor-in-chief with another guy.

LIU's basketball team won the recently established National Invitational Tournament (NIT) in two of those three years. Hano wrote later "I didn't know how or what – would it be a newspaper, or freelance, or a novelist, but I knew I'd write." Hano went on to earn his Bachelor's degree in 1941.

== Career ==
That summer, Hano was employed as a copy boy by the New York Daily News: Accompanying the News photographer to sporting events, he provided captions for those shots chosen to be published. Hano wrote almost 70 years later:

I'm the luckiest fan in the history of the world. When I was a copy boy at the Daily News, I was sitting in the Ebbetts Field press box when that ball got away from Mickey Owen.

After the US entered World War II, Hano followed his brother into the armed forces in 1942, Alfred to the Air Force and Arnold to the Army. He served in an artillery battalion of the Seventh Infantry Division, participating in the Aleutian Islands Campaign and later landing in the first wave on Kwajalein Atoll. Informed that his brother was missing in action on a mission over Germany, Hano successfully applied to be commissioned as an infantry officer at Fort Benning, allowing him to be deployed to the European Theater where he hoped to find his brother. Before this plan could be realized, the war ended and Alfred's remains were recovered.

After his discharge, Hano returned to New York to a career in book publishing, first as managing editor with Bantam (1947–49), then as editor-in-chief with Lion Books (1949–54), working with novelists C. M. Kornbluth, David Goodis, David Karp and particularly Jim Thompson, whose productivity thrived under Hano's guidance.

In 1951, Hano debuted as an author with the baseball-themed young adult novel, The Big Out, described by The New York Times' reviewer Ralph Adams Brown as "one of the most thrilling sports novels this reviewer has ever read."

In 1954, Hano left Lion Books after a company-wide 10% pay cut imposed by Martin Goodman. At Game 1 of the 1954 World Series, Hano's handwritten record of the event would form the basis for 1955's A Day in the Bleachers. Despite poor marketing and disappointing sales, the book was critically acclaimed. and eventually regarded as a classic of sports literature, with new editions published in 1982, 2004, and 2006. The book's signature passage—its description of Willie Mays' famous catch—is frequently cited, quoted, or reprinted in full.

Buoyed by the book's reception, Hano began to establish himself as a freelance writer, his work appearing in publications such as The Saturday Evening Post, Esquire, The New York Times, the Los Angeles Times, TV Guide, Sport, Sports Illustrated, Seventeen, Good Housekeeping, Boys' Life, (Note: See Further reading.) Argosy, Saga Magazine, and True's Baseball Yearbook. He also authored several sports biographies in the 1960s and '70s, including those of Mays, Sandy Koufax, Roberto Clemente, Kareem Abdul-Jabbar and Muhammad Ali. Hano was a frequent contributor to Lion Books' (later Pyramid Books') annual paperback series, Baseball Stars of 19__, providing forty of its chapter-long player profiles between 1958 and 1975, some of which were collected in Greatest Giants of Them All in 1967. In addition, he wrote film novelizations of Marriage Italian Style (1966), Bandolero! (1969) and Running Wild (1973), published by Popular Library.

On April 7, 1964, Hano was named 1963's Magazine Sportswriter of the Year by the National Sportscasters and Sportswriters Association. He also received the 1963 Sidney Hillman Memorial Award for magazine journalism for "Burned Out Americans", a muckraking study of conditions facing migratory farm workers in California's Central Valley.

Hano taught writing at the University of Southern California, Pitzer College, and the University of California, Irvine. and a contributing editor at Orange Coast Magazine (1989–92).

In 2012, Hano became the 12th recipient of Baseball Reliquary's annual Hilda Award, established in 2001 "to recognize distinguished service to the game by a fan." Four years later, with his induction into the Shrine of the Eternals, Hano became the first person to be honored twice by the Baseball Reliquary.

In 2015, The Huffington Post announced the release of Hano! A Century in the Bleachers, a documentary of Arnold Hano's life and work, produced and directed by Jon Leonoudakis. Among its interviewees are Hano and fellow sportswriters Ron Rapoport, Ray Robinson, John Schulian, Al Silverman and George Vecsey, plus artist Mark Ulriksen, and former Major League players (and subjects of Hano's articles) Orlando Cepeda and Felipe Alou.

== Personal life ==
Hano had two children (Stephen A. and Susan C. Hano) by his first marriage, and a daughter, Laurel, by his second, the former Bonnie Abraham.

From September 1955, the Hanos resided in Laguna Beach, besides a two-year Peace Corps stint in Costa Rica in 1991. Hano was instrumental in writing and promoting a 1971 voter initiative establishing a 36-foot height limit on new buildings; with close to 62 percent of the city's registered voters participating, the measure was approved by a better than 3-to-1 margin. In 2013, Hano and his wife were honored as Laguna Beach "Citizens of the Year" in the city's annual Patriot's Day Parade.

Hano died on October 24, 2021, at his home in Laguna Beach, California. He was 99 years old.
