= Daisho Tana =

Personal life
- Born: March 20, 1901 Sapporo, Japan
- Died: October 1, 1972 (aged 71) Palo Alto, California
- Spouse: Tomoe Tana (m. 1938)
- Children: 4

Religious life
- Religion: Buddhist

Daisho Tana (田名大正, Tana Daisho; March 20, 1901 – October 1972) was a Buddhist missionary, leader of the Palo Alto Buddhist Temple and is best known for his detailed diaries kept during his internment in both California and New Mexico. Husband to Tomoe Tana, a well renowned tanka poet, the couple had four children, Yasuto, Shibun Tana, Chinin, and Akira Yasuto Tana, and Akira Tana.

== Early life ==
Reverend Tana was born in Sapporo, Hokkaido, Japan and studied at the Kyoto Buddhist College He came to the United States in 1928 to serve as a priest with the Buddhist Churches of America. In 1938, he married Tomoe Tana, the daughter of a Buddhist priest residing on the island of Hokkaido, Japan. Daisho Tana's marriage was arranged by his brother-in-law. Prior to the marriage, he had never met his wife, and she had never been to the United States.

== Internment ==
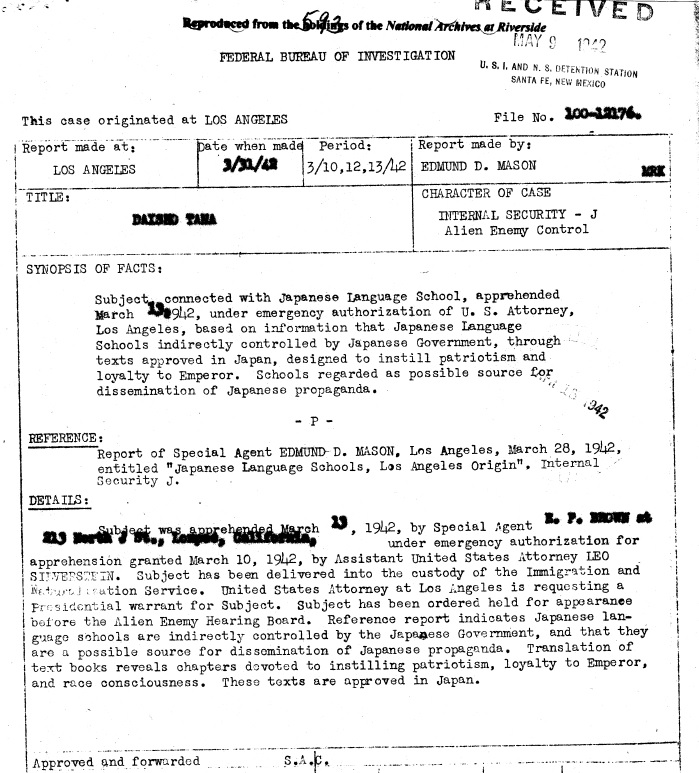
Copy of the FBI report detailing Reverend Tana's detention

Like many Japanese or Japanese Americans, Daisho Tana was interned by the Federal Government after Executive Order 9066 was issued by Franklin D. Roosevelt on February 19, 1942. Due to Mr. Tana's association with a Japanese language school as a teacher in Lompoc, California, an emergency order was issued to apprehend Mr. Tana on March 10, 1942. Special Agent Edmund D. Mason apprehended Mr. Tana and presented him to the Alien Enemy Control board.

Originally, Mr. Tana was taken to the Santa Barbara county jail, then held at the Tuna Canyon Detention Center where he stayed for approximately two weeks. Afterwards, Mr. Tana was transferred to the Lordsburgh Camp in Santa Fe, New Mexico. Mr. Tana's family, including his wife and two sons, were held at the Gila River War Relocation Center, also in Arizona.

Reverend Tana kept detailed journals throughout his internment. These journals provide an important glimpse into the daily life and routine of these men and women. As an example from his diaries, we can learn about his first day at Tuna Canyon on March 14, 1942:

We were provided with black coffee and oatmeal on a rectangular shaped dish. Not quite satisfying, we all partook of some botamochi (a Japanese sweet made with rice and red bean) that Mr. Hotta brought last night as left overs from lunch that he had had on his way to the camp. This botamochi was cut in half to feed the twelve of us.

Later, even more personal references can be found, including a poem written to him by his wife, Tomoe Tana, and included in a notebook she sent to him:

If I open my eyes, I can see my husband.
Even if I close them, my husband appears as mine.
Shackled, give me wings
So that I can go to where my husband sleeps.
I try to be strong
But a wife’s attachments never ends day and night.
Waking up in the middle of the night thinking I caught a glimpse of him
It was just the shadow of a pillow.

- Tomoe, March 19

After 13 days at Camp Tuna Canyon, Reverend Tana was transferred to Lordsburgh Camp on March 26, 1942 along with 209 other detainees. He stayed at Lordsburgh, on the outskirts of Santa Fe, New Mexico. Reverend's Tana was reunited with his wife and children after leaving Lordsburgh Camp.

== After internment ==
It took six months after the war ended for him to be reunited with his family. After the war, he lived with his family "in Richmond, California and Hawaii until 1951, and then settled in Palo Alto, California. "Daisho Tana served as a minister of the Palo Alto Buddhist church until ill health forced his early retirement in 1956." "We know that Daisho Tana had been residing in Palo Alto, Santa Clara County, California."

His wife, Tomoe, "worked as a house cleaner for 27 years to support" him and her sons. Tomoe, who died in 1991, was an acclaimed poet. She began writing poetry at the age of ten and in 1949 received an invitation to attend Emperor Hirohito's annual poetry contest in Japan.

His first son, Yasuto, "graduated from UC Berkeley and went on to become a Lieutenant Commander in the United States Navy." His second son, Shibun, "graduated from San Jose State University and joined IBM." His third son, Chinin, "received a full scholarship to Harvard Law School" and practiced law after graduating from UC Berkeley. His fourth and last son, Akira, "also received a full scholarship to Harvard University," then studied at New England Conservatory of Music and pursued a career as a Jazz musician."

"Daisho died in October 1972 at 71 years old." After his death, his wife, Tana Tomoe, published Daisho's diaries with the title, that translated into English means "A Diary of An Enemy Alien in Santa Fe and Lordsburg Internment Camps, ... in four volumes between 1976 and 1989. The diary begins on December 7, 1941—the day Japanese Navy attacked Pearl Harbor, leading to Tana’s arrest three months later by the Federal Bureau of Investigation and separation from his family—and ends on March 31, 1946—three days before his release by the Department of Justice."
