= Gila River War Relocation Center =

Internment camp for Japanese-Americans during World War II

Gila River Relocation Center
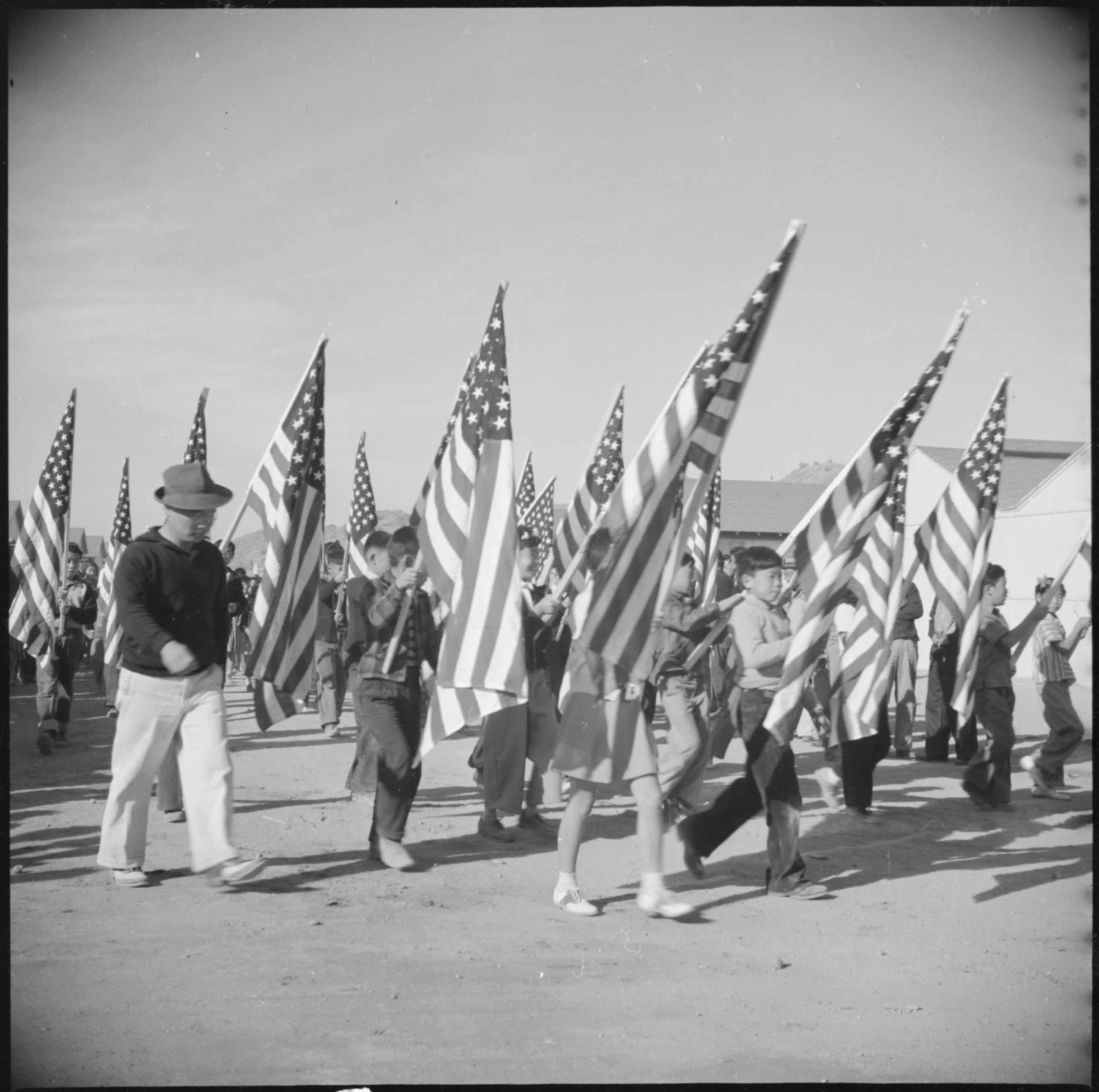
- School children participating in the Harvest Festival Parade

- Location in Pinal County and the state of Arizona

- Location in the United States
- Coordinates: 33°03′54″N 111°49′50″W; Gila River Relocation Center (historical)
- Country: United States
- State: Arizona
- County: Pinal

Area
  - Total: 2.4 sq mi (6.1 km^{2})
  - Land: 2.4 sq mi (6.2 km^{2})
- Time zone: UTC-7 (MST (no DST))

The Gila River War Relocation Center was an American concentration camp in Arizona, one of several built by the War Relocation Authority (WRA) during the Second World War for the incarceration of Japanese Americans from the West Coast of the United States. It was located within the Gila River Indian Reservation (over their objections) near the town of Sacaton, about 30 mi (48.3 km) southeast of Phoenix. With a peak population of 13,348, it became the fourth-largest city in the state, operating from May 1942 to November 16, 1945.

== Internment ==
The rationale for internment was fear of the threat of sabotage on the West Coast by the large Japanese American population. Immediately following the attack on Pearl Harbor, President Franklin D. Roosevelt issued Executive Order 9066. This order authorized the Secretary of War and military commanders to designate areas to detain people living in the United States who might be a threat to the country and its interests. Though it did not expressly name Japanese Americans (or anyone of Japanese ancestry) to be detained, it was implied due to the outbreak of war with Japan. The Secretary of War was also told to make accommodation for those held by the government. The order stated: "The Secretary of War is hereby authorized to provide for residents of any such area who are excluded therefrom, such transportation, food, shelter, and other accommodations as may be necessary". The order also gave authority of the prescribed areas to the Secretary of War ahead of other departments in the government and allowed the use of federal troops to enforce compliance with government rules in those areas. Placed in command of issuing the forced removal of Japanese Americans from their homes and businesses in the West Coast was commander of the Western Defense Command Lt. Gen. John L. DeWitt. The internment camps were hastily constructed within a few months after the issue of the order. Living quarters across all camps resembled military style barracks as they were constructed from military surplus equipment. Living space was generally tight and incredibly cramped among families.

The forced removal of Japanese Americans from the "affected areas" of California, Oregon, Washington, and Arizona started from April to May 1942. Families were given just under one week to get their personal and professional affairs in order. As a result, individual families lost thousands of dollars from having to hastily sell off properties severely under market value. After the war, many Japanese Americans who had been interned had to start over to build their businesses and livelihoods from scratch. In the 1980s, the federal government acknowledged that it had committed an injustice against Japanese Americans with this act. Congress passed the Civil Liberties Act of 1988, an official apology and authorization to provide restitution to survivors and descendants of inmates. In total 119,000 Americans of Japanese descent were incarcerated throughout World War II.

== Camp history ==
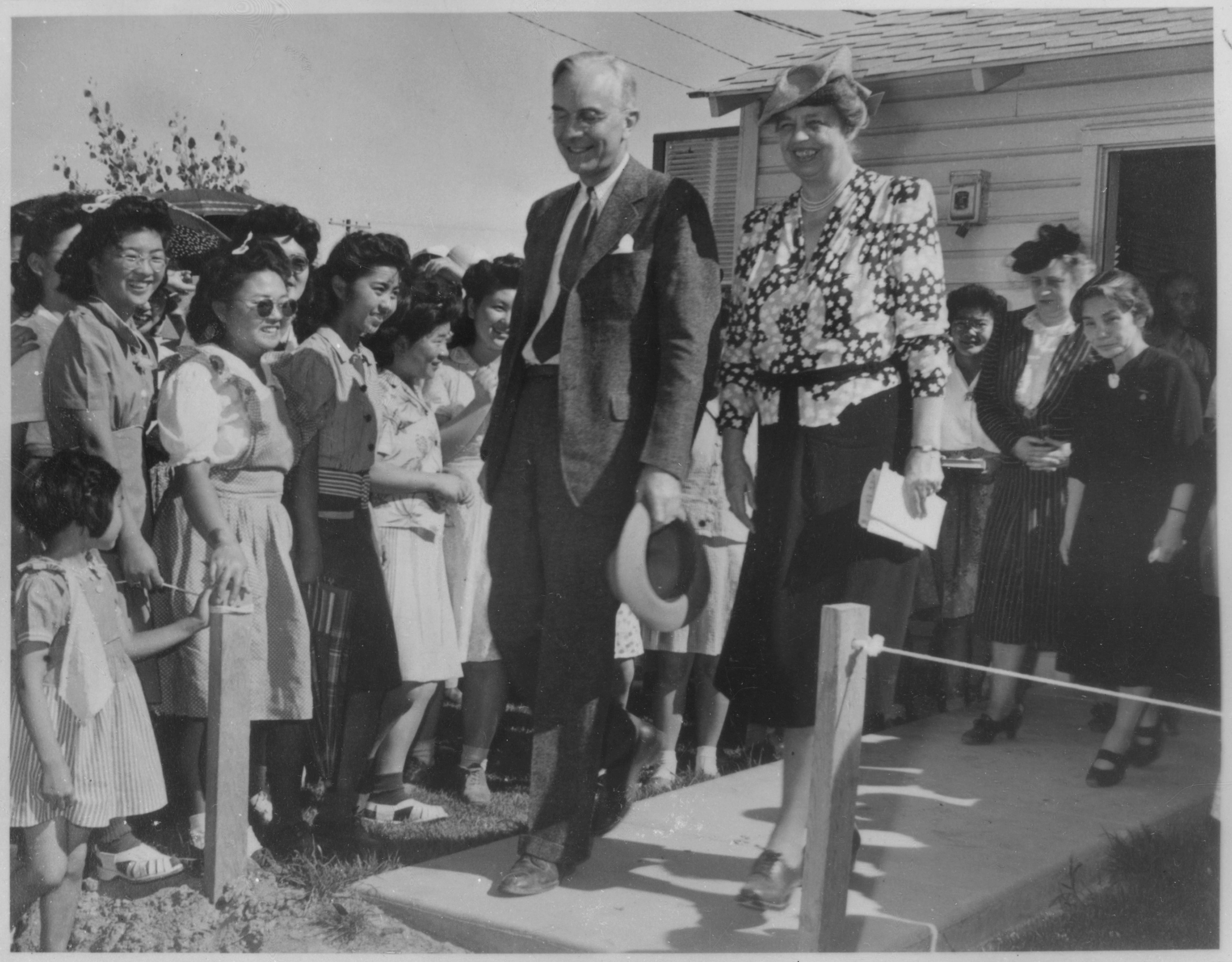
First Lady Eleanor Roosevelt and Dillon S. Myer, director of the War Relocation Authority, visit the Gila River War Relocation Center (April 23, 1943)

Gila River War Relocation Center was one of ten internment camps, operated by the WRA located throughout the American interior west. The Gila River camp was one of two internment camps located in Arizona, the other being Poston War Relocation Center. Most camps including Gila River were chosen due to their solitary geographic locations, many of which were located in the middle of deserts. The camp was located on the Gila River Indian Reservation, near an irrigated agricultural center. It comprised two separate camps, named 'Canal' and 'Butte'. Construction began on May 1, 1942, over the strong objections of the reservation's Pima Indian government. The official opening took place less than two months later, on July 20. Canal Camp closed on September 28, 1945. Butte Camp was shut down on November 10, 1945; and the Gila River Relocation Center was officially closed on November 16, 1945.

Gila River received incarcerees from California (Fresno, Sacramento, and Los Angeles). In addition, it took in 2,000 people from the Jerome War Relocation Center in Arkansas when that facility closed in 1944. It became Arizona's fourth-largest city, with a peak population of 13,348.

Some of the incarcerees died en route to Gila River or shortly after arrival in the harsh desert environment. One of these was the mother of Iva Toguri. Toguri was an American woman of Japanese descent who broadcast for the Japanese and was later condemned as "Tokyo Rose"; she was convicted of treason, based on perjured testimony.

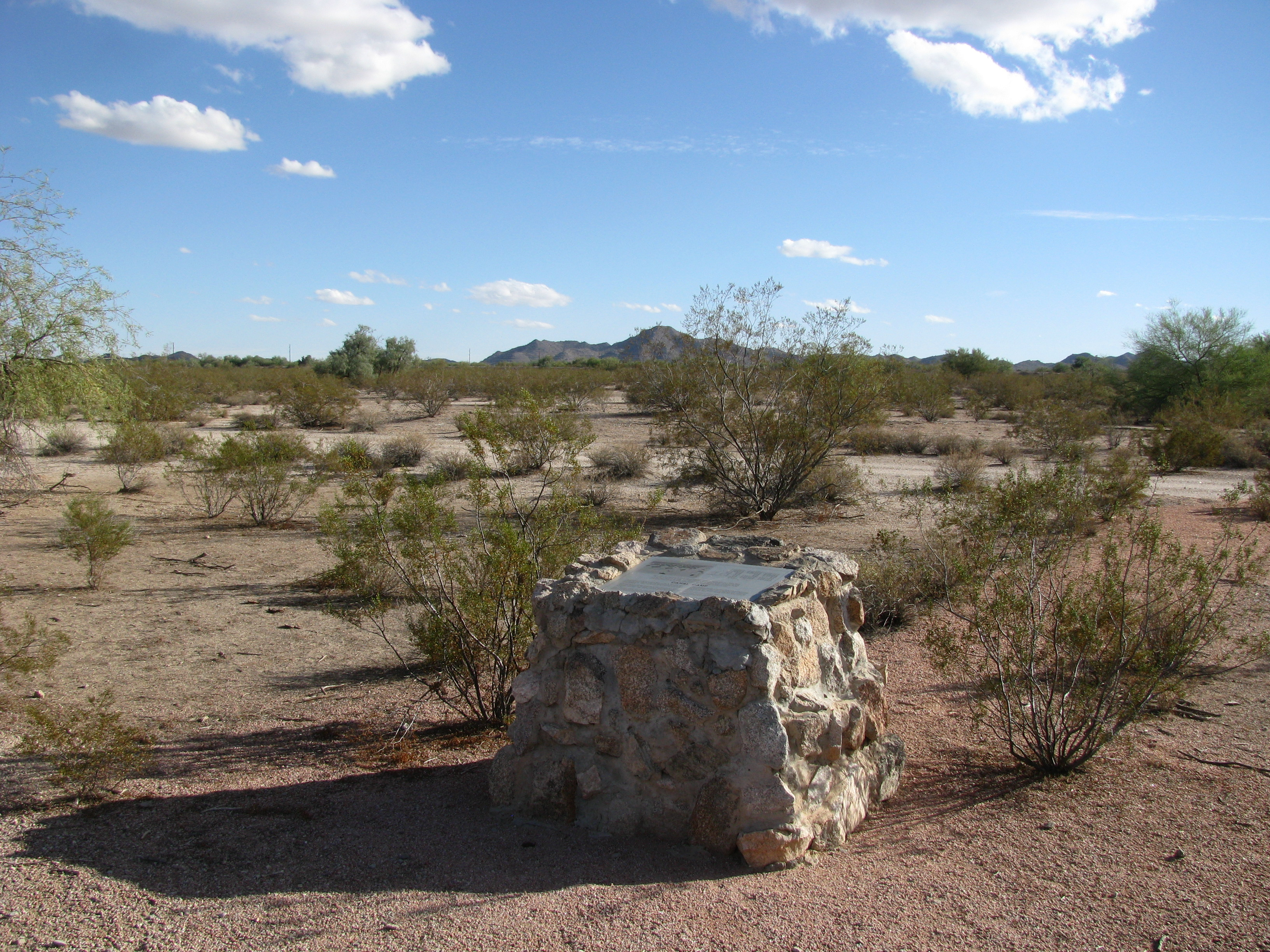
Canal Camp Monument

Gila River was considered one of the least oppressive camps of its kind. It had only a single watchtower, and its fences were among the few that lacked barbed wire. The administrators of the camps seemed to care for the incarcerees, and allowed them access to the amenities of Phoenix. Gila River was one of the first WRA camps to have a local "democratic" governing body of internees for the camp, supervised closely by the WRA. A representative of every block was nominated to the council however, only Nisei (second generation U.S. born Japanese Americans) were allowed to hold the offices. They also encouraged recreational activities such as sports and arts. Butte camp contained a 6,000-seat baseball field, designed by Kenichi Zenimura, a professional baseball player, and considered to be the best in the WRA system. Incarcerees also built a theater for plays and films, and playgrounds, and planted trees to relieve the desolation of the arid site. Gila River had a communal medical facility at Butte Hospital. Canal Camp had 404 buildings with 232 barracks and 24 separate schoolhouses. Butte Camp contained 821 buildings with 627 residential barracks. These barracks were made of wood and fireproof shingles that were of limited effectiveness in blocking out the desert heat. Each barrack was made to house four single families in separate apartments. But, the camp exceeded its capacity: it was designed for 10,000 residents, and held more than 13,000. Because of this, some families were housed in the mess hall or recreation buildings, where they had to use hanging blankets as makeshift walls for visual privacy. Water shortages also plagued the camp. Inmates' encounters with venomous rattlesnakes and scorpions resulted in bites that kept Butte Hospital extremely busy.

The land for the camp sites is owned by the Gila River Indian Tribe and is considered sacred by them. They have restricted public access to the historic sites. All the main structures are long gone. Remaining are such elements as the road grid, concrete slab foundations, manholes, cisterns, several rock alignments, and dozens of small ponds.

During the Ronald Reagan Administration, the federal government acknowledged that it had committed an injustice against Japanese Americans with this program. Congress passed a resolution of official apology and authorization to provide compensation to survivors and descendants of inmates. On December 21, 2006, President George W. Bush signed H.R. 1492 into law guaranteeing $38,000,000 in federal money to restore the Gila River relocation center, along with nine other former American concentration camps used to house Japanese Americans.

== Notable internees ==
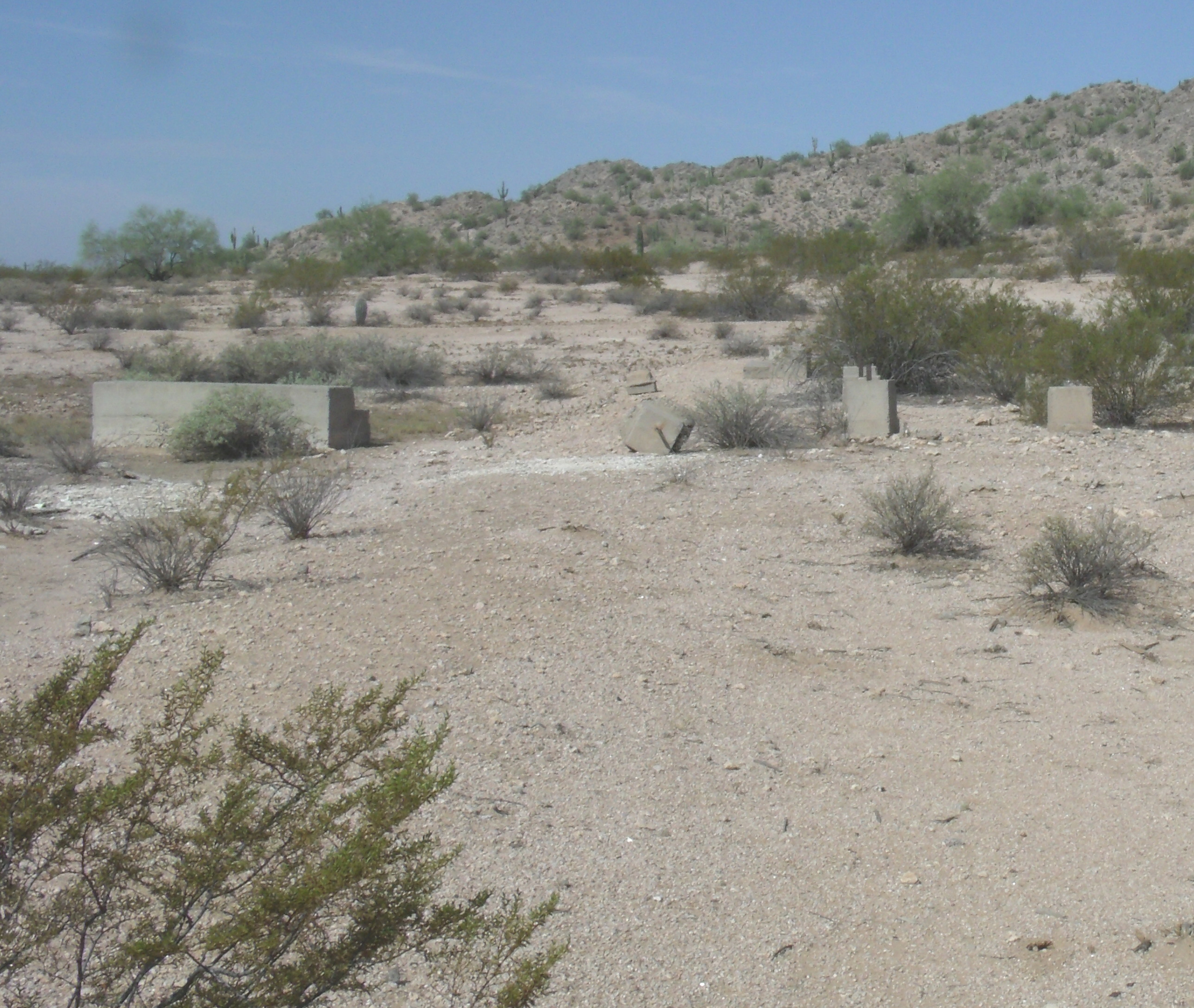
Ruins of the buildings in the Gila River War Relocation Center of Camp Butte

- George Aratani (1917–2013), an entrepreneur and philanthropist
- Harry K. Fukuhara (1920–2015), inducted in the United States Military Intelligence Hall of Fame
- Evelyn Nakano Glenn (b. 1940), a professor of Gender & Women Studies and of Ethnic Studies at the University of California, Berkeley and founding director of the Center for Race and Gender (CRG). Also interned at Heart Mountain.
- Masumi Hayashi (1945–2006), an American photographer and artist
- George Hoshida (1907–1985), a Japanese American artist who made drawings of his experience during his incarceration in three internment camps. Also interned at Jerome
- Dale Ishimoto (1923–2004), an American actor
- Toichiro Kawai (1861–1943), a carpenter known for building the moon bridge and bell tower at the Japanese Garden of the Huntington Library
- Yuriko Kikuchi (1920–2022), an American dancer and choreographer
- Jay Kazuo Kochi (1927–2008), a physical organic chemist
- Tetsu Komai (1894–1970), an American actor
- Tomoko Miho (1931–2012), a designer and recipient of the 1993 AIGA Medal
- Noriyuki "Pat" Morita (1932–2005), an American actor known for roles on Happy Days and in the Karate Kid movies. Also interned at Tule Lake
- Paul Osumi (1905–1996), Japanese Christian minister
- Ken and Miye Ota (1923–2015 and 1918-2024 respectively), a married couple known for teaching martial arts, ballroom dancing, and social graces at their cultural school
- Kazuo Otani (1918–1944), a United States Army soldier and a recipient of the Medal of Honor
- Shoji Sadao (1927–2019), an architect
- Reiko Sato (1931–1981), an American dancer and actress
- Miiko Taka (1925–2023), an American actress
- Nao Takasugi (1922–2009), an American politician
- James Takemori (1926–2015), an American judoka and World War II veteran
- Daisho Tana (1901–1972), a Buddhist missionary and leader of the Palo Alto Buddhist Temple
- Paul Terasaki (1929–2016), organ transplant scientist and Professor Emeritus of Surgery at UCLA School of Medicine
- Michi Nishiura Weglyn (1926–1999), author of Years of Infamy: The Untold Story of America’s Concentration Camps
- Kenichi Zenimura (1900–1968), a baseball player and manager
- Tatsuro Masuda (1916-1991), Oakland businessman whose "I AM AN AMERICAN" sign was photographed by Dorothea Lange

== Gallery ==
Historic Gila River War Relocation Center
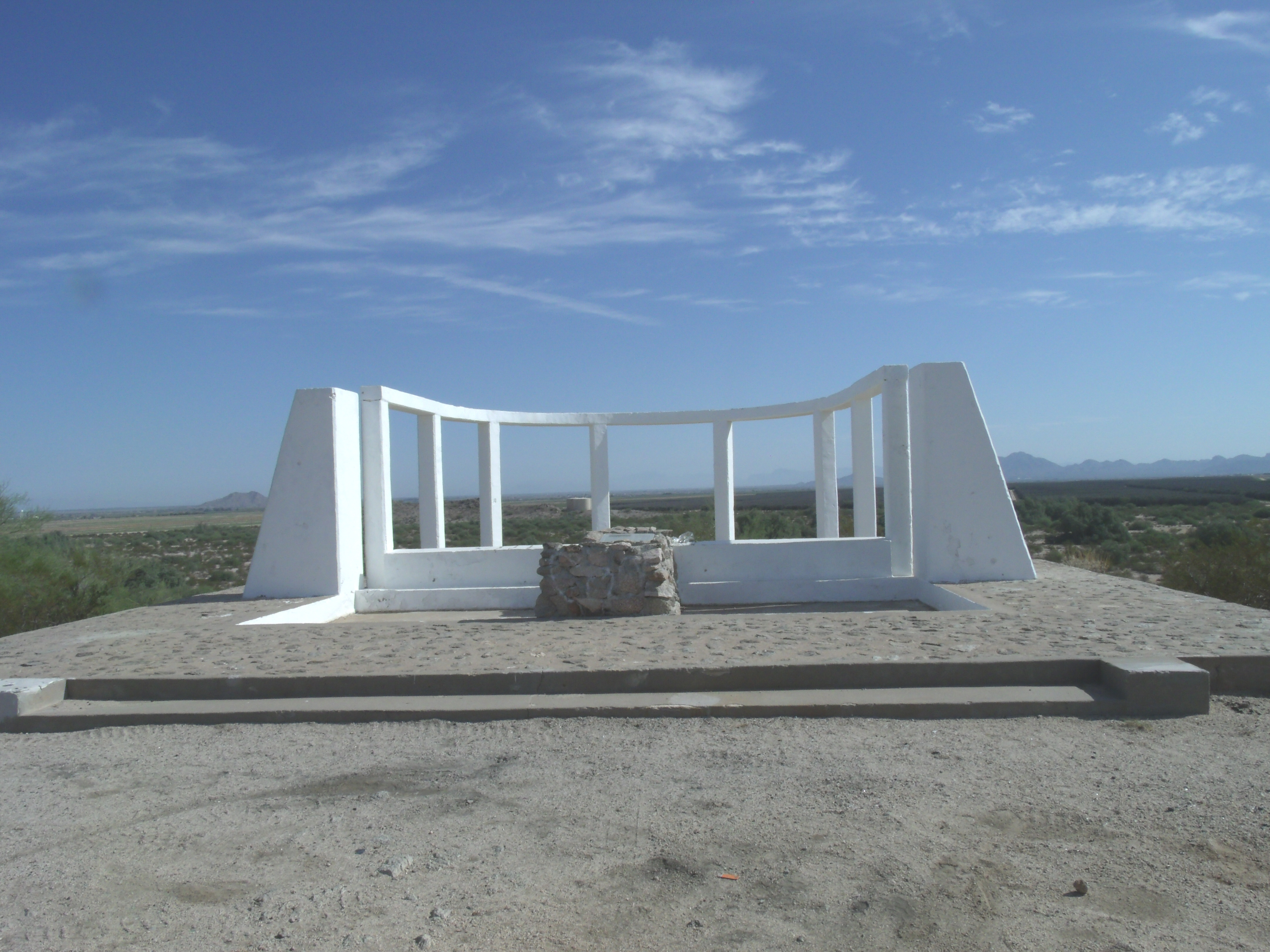
The Gila River War Relocation Center was an internment camp built by the War Relocation Authority (WRA) for the internment of Japanese Americans during the Second World War. The Gila River War Relocation Memorial is located at Indian Route 24, Sacaton, Az.

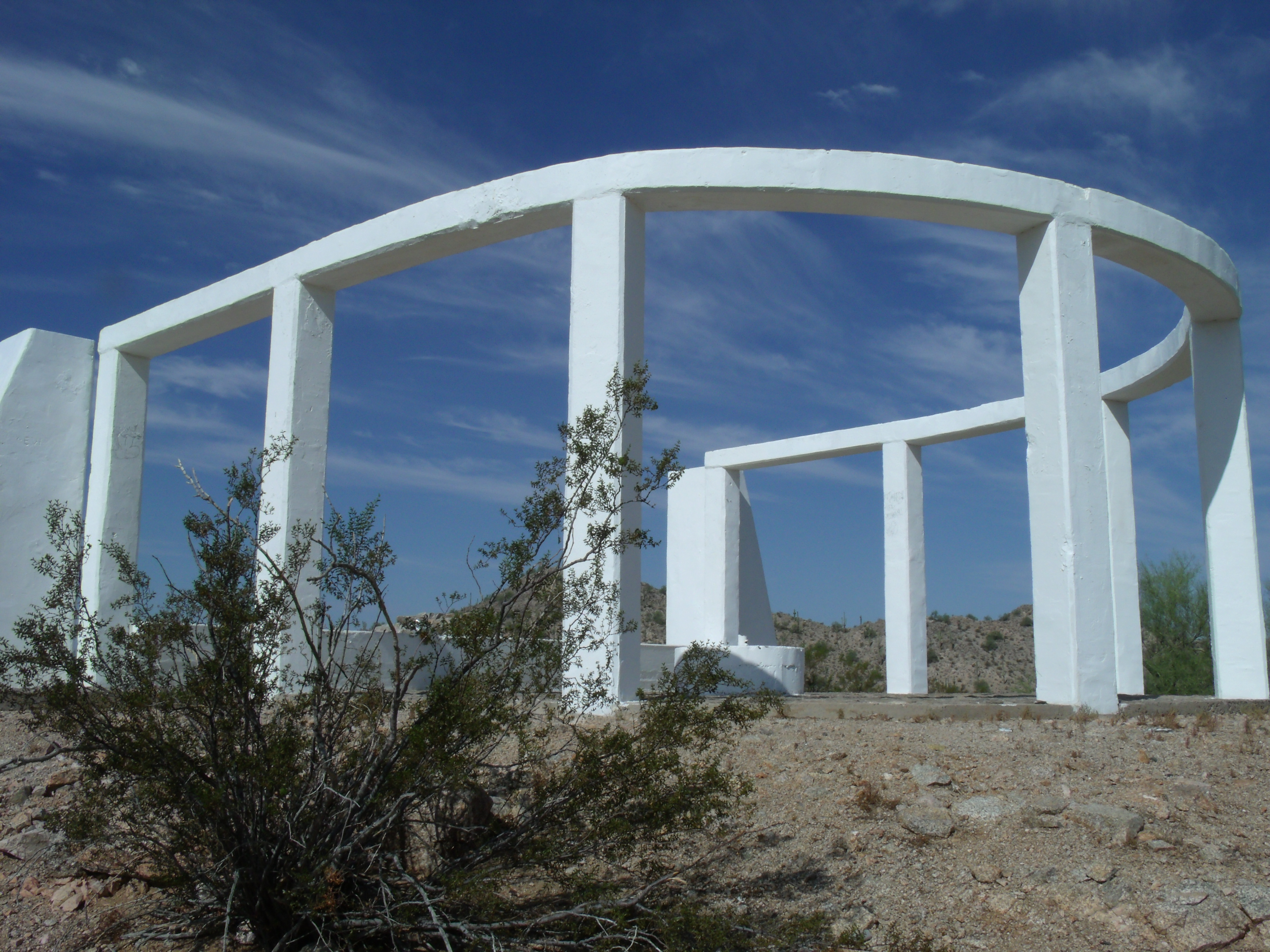
Different view of the Gila River War Relocation Memorial located in a former American concentration camp built by the War Relocation Authority (WRA) for the internment of Japanese Americans during the Second World War.

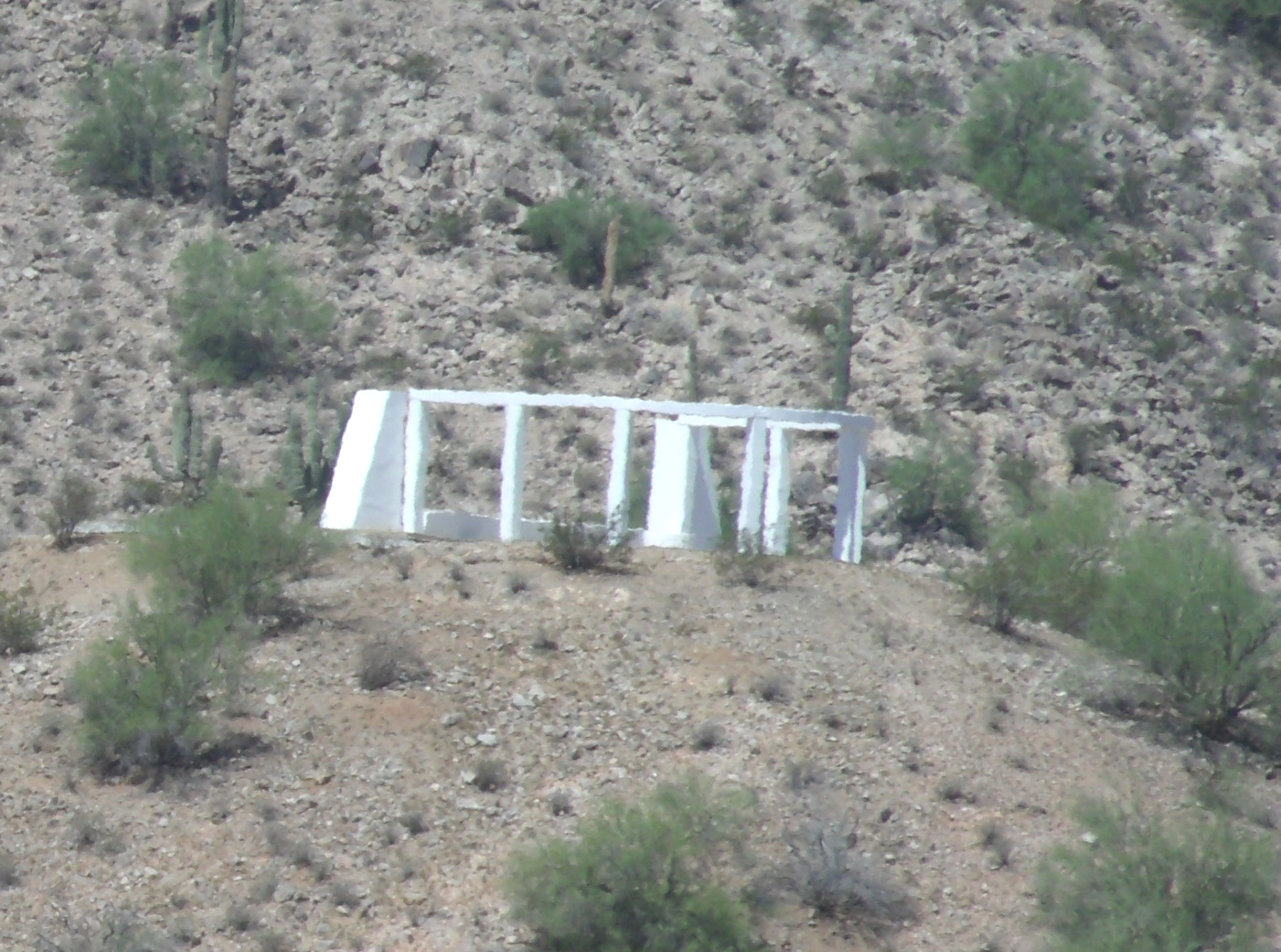
The Gila River War Relocation Memorial on Butte Mountain.

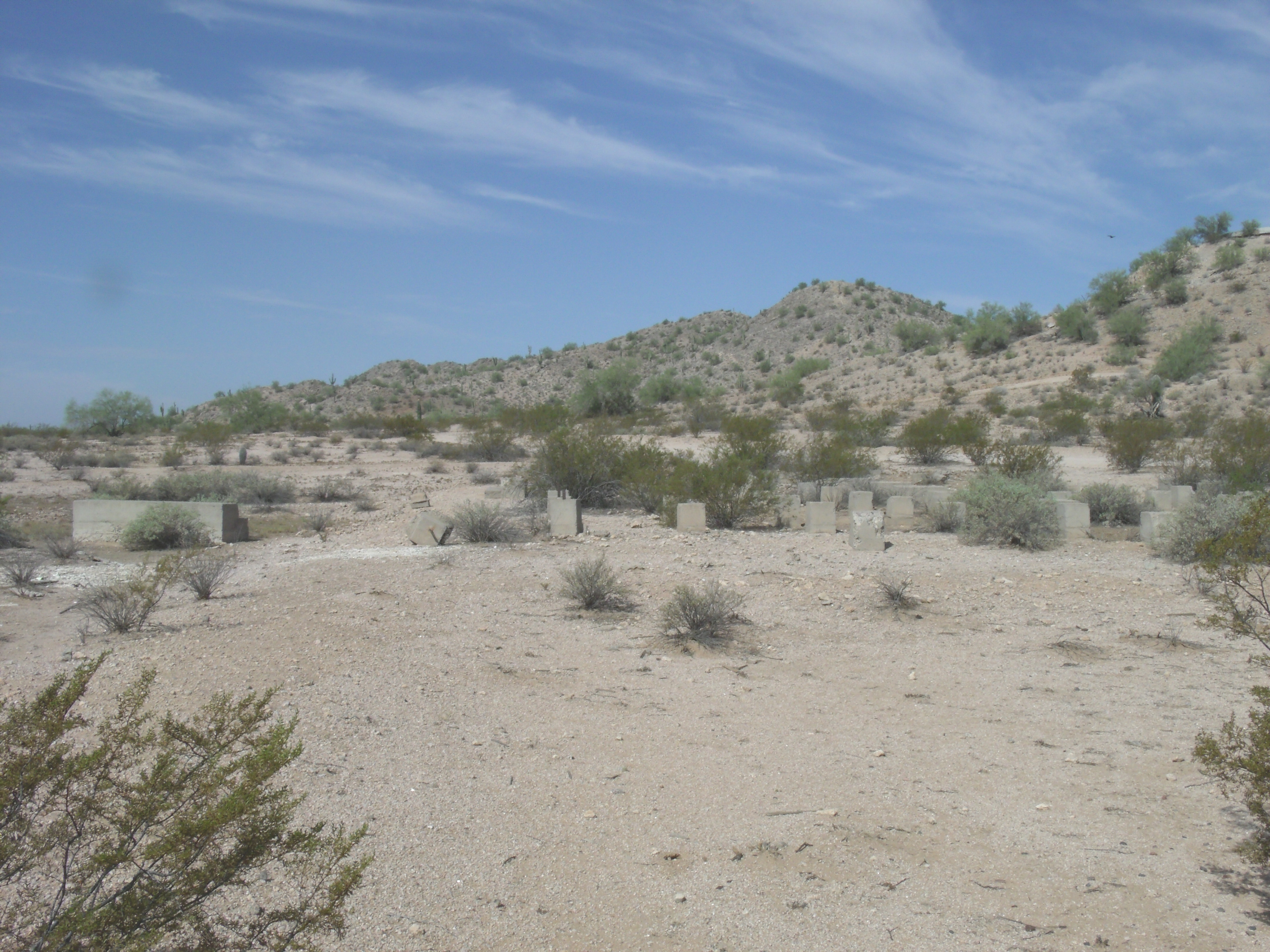
Ruins of the Gila River War Relocation Center.

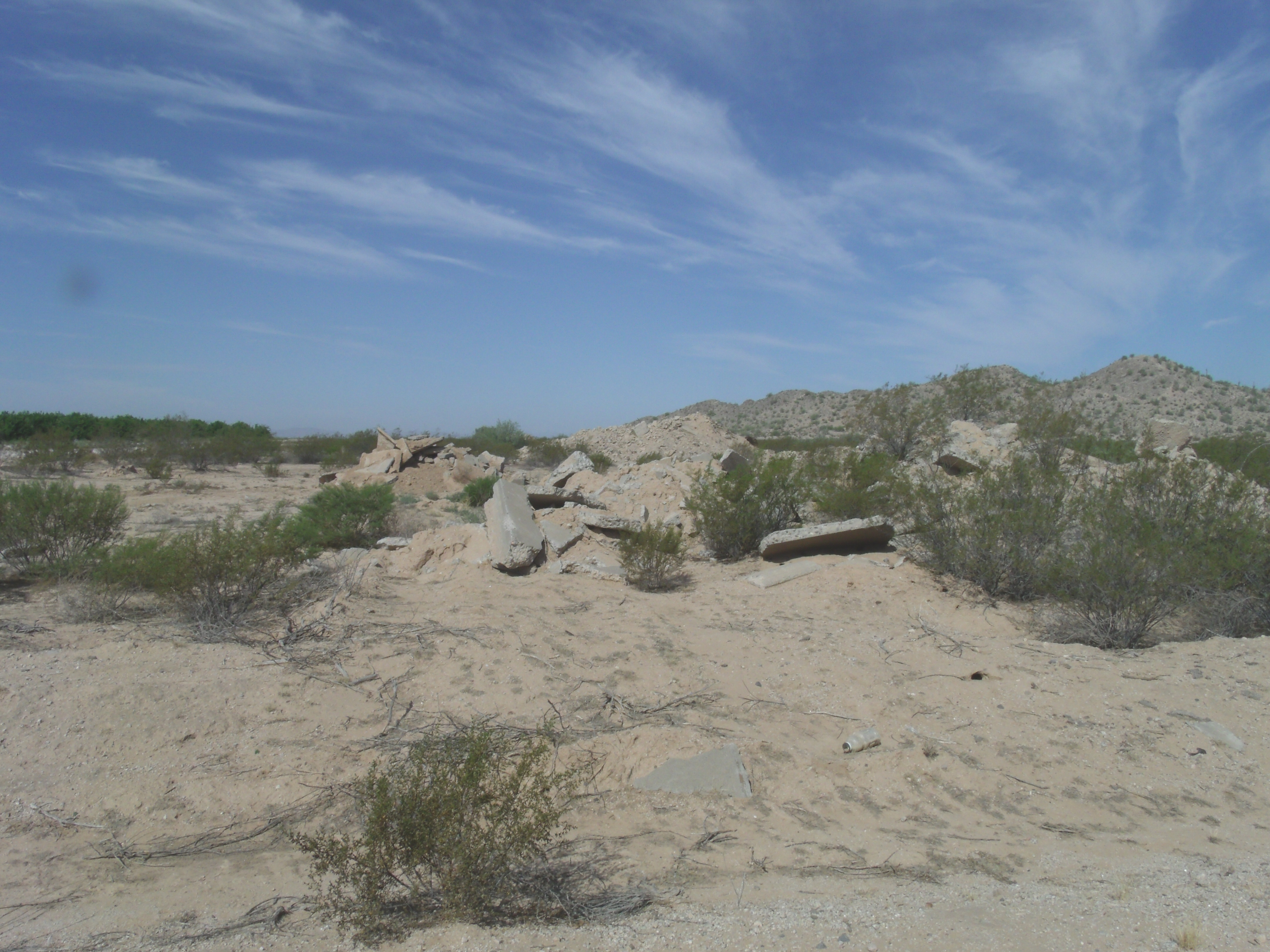
Ruins of the Gila River War Relocation Center.

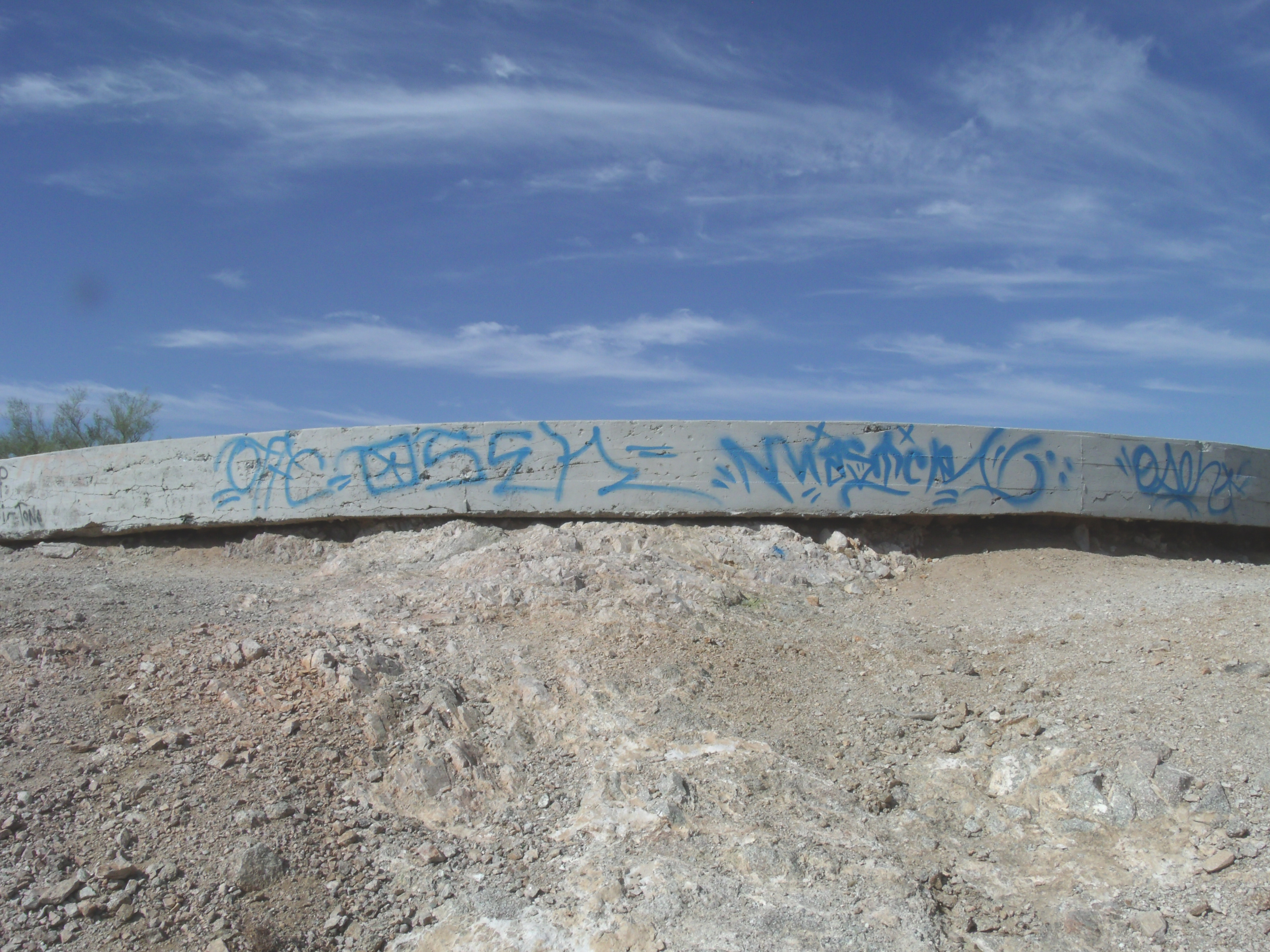
A concrete slab foundation of the Gila River War Relocation Center.

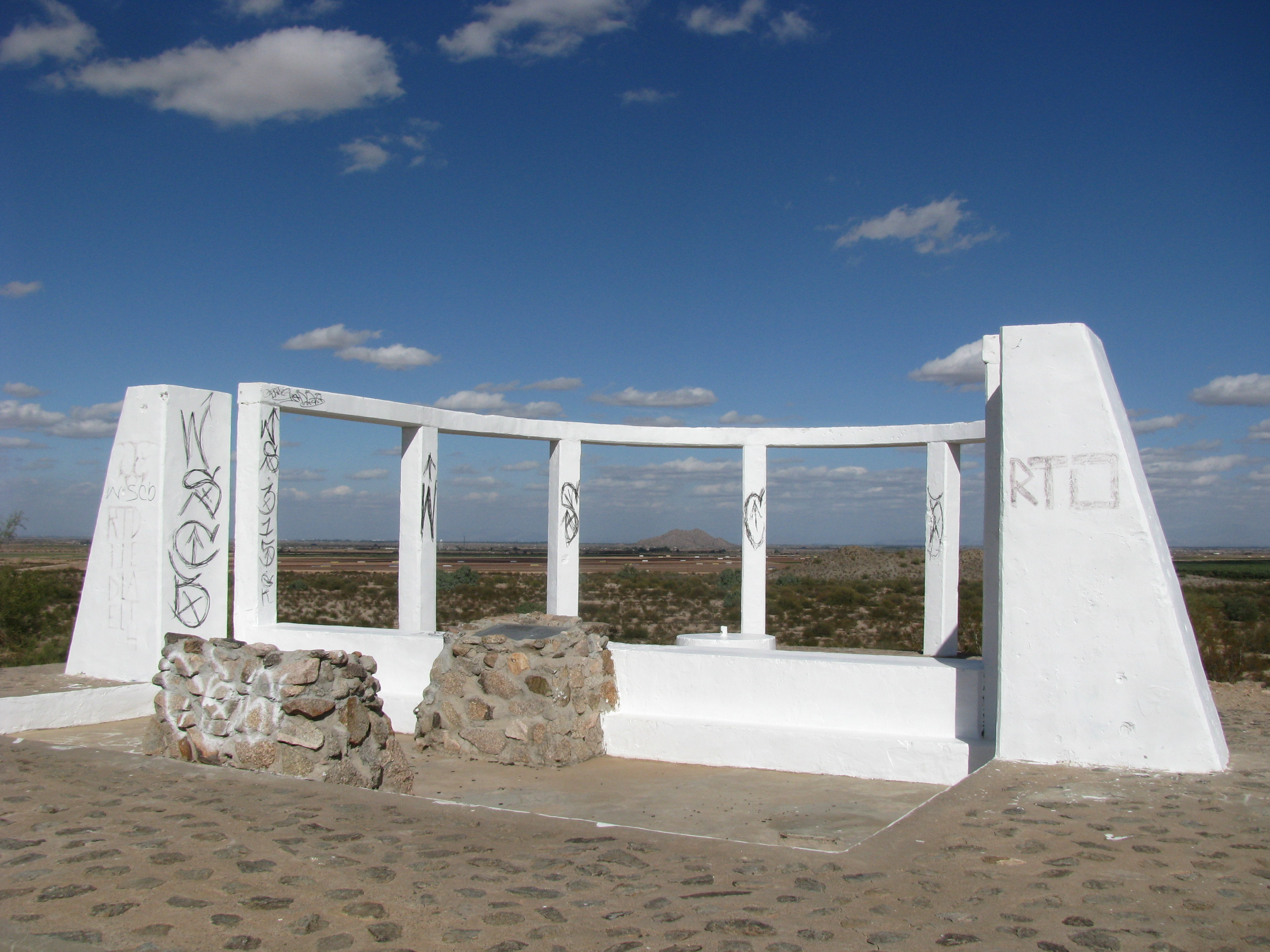
Butte Camp Monument

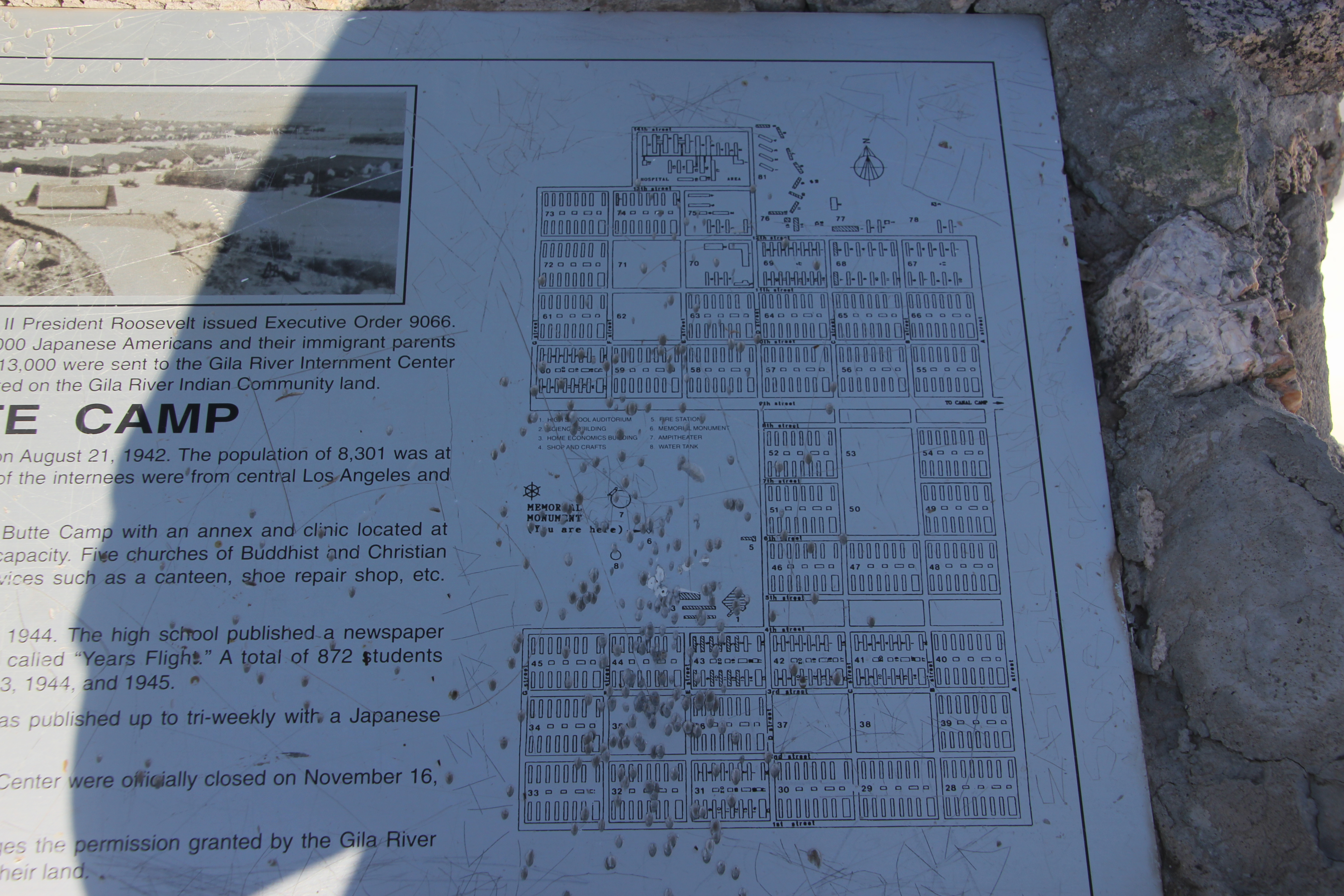
Plaque at Gila River Memorial

== See also ==
- Bibliography of the Japanese American Internment during World War II
- Outline of Japanese American Internment during World War II
- Densho: The Japanese American Legacy Project
- Other camps:
  - Granada War Relocation Center
  - Heart Mountain War Relocation Center
  - Jerome War Relocation Center
  - Manzanar National Historic Site
  - Minidoka National Historic Site
  - Poston War Relocation Center
  - Rohwer War Relocation Center
  - Topaz War Relocation Center
  - Tule Lake War Relocation Center
