= Satoshi Hirayama =

American baseball player (1930–2021)

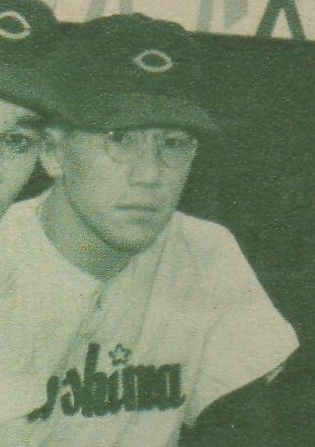
- Hirayama with the Hiroshima Carp in 1956
- Outfielder
- Born: February 17, 1930; Exeter, California, U.S.
- Died: September 15, 2021 (aged 91)
- Batted: Right Threw: Right

NPB statistics
- Batting average: .229
- Home runs: 45
- Runs batted in: 251
- Stats at Baseball Reference

Teams
- Hiroshima Carp (1955–1964)

Career highlights and awards
- 2× NPB All-Star (1956, 1958)

Satoshi Hirayama (平山智, Hirayama Satoshi; February 17, 1930 – September 15, 2021) was an American baseball player who played for the Hiroshima Carp in Japan's Central League. Hirayama was an All-Star twice in Japan.

== Early life and amateur career ==
Hirayama got the nickname "Fibber" from his father's inability to pronounce "February", the month of his birth. He was originally from Exeter, California. At 12 years old, following the signing of Executive Order 9066, he was interned at the Poston War Relocation Center with his father and two brothers. After three years, when World War II ended, he was released and began attending Exeter Union High School from which he graduated in 1947.

Hirayama was a star athlete at Fresno State, playing both baseball and football as a halfback. Hirayama attended the school on a football scholarship and only played baseball because he did not want to play spring football. He wound up playing three seasons of each. On the baseball field, he set a college baseball record with five stolen bases in a single game and had a .420 batting average in 1950. He was voted "Nisei Player of the Year" in 1951. In 1952, he led Fresno State to its first ever NCAA postseason appearance. Hirayama set single-season and career school records in stolen bases which would not be surpassed until 1987 by Tom Goodwin.

On April 30, 2017, he became the eleventh player to have his number retired by Fresno State's baseball program.

== Professional career ==
After college, Hirayama signed a professional contract with the St. Louis Browns and spent the 1952 season with the Stockton Ports. He was one of the first Japanese-American players to sign with a Major League Baseball club.

In 1953, Hirayama was drafted into the military. From 1953 to 1955, he continued playing baseball as a soldier at Fort Ord. After being discharged, Hirayama signed with the Hiroshima Carp of Nippon Professional Baseball on the insistence of fellow Japanese-American Kenichi Zenimura. In 1954, the Browns granted Hirayama his release and he and his wife moved to Japan. Hirayama did not speak Japanese upon arrival but became fluent after a few years. Toward the end of his playing career, Hirayama was serving as a player-coach. His playing career was cut short when he ran into a wall and suffered a nerve injury which caused him to lose some vision in his right eye.

After retiring as a player, Hirayama spent three years coaching and one year managing in the Japanese minor leagues before returning to the United States. Hirayama returned to California where he worked as a scout for the California Angels and Hiroshima Carp. As a scout, he helped the Carp sign Tim Ireland.

In 2009, Hirayama won the Al Radka Award. At the time, he was the head of the Japanese Baseball Development Program in the Dominican Republic.

== Personal life ==
Hirayama met his wife, Jean, while they were attending Fresno State. They were married in February 1955 and had three sons, Colin, Kevin and Brian. After returning to the United States, Hirayama also worked as a teacher and administrator in the Clovis Unified School District in addition to his scouting duties. He retired from the school district in 1991 and his wife died that same year. In 2024, Clovis Unified opened a new elementary school bearing his name.

In the 2 1/2 years before his former Fresno State teammate Tex Clevenger died of Alzheimer's disease in August 2019, Hirayama (then 89 years old himself) would drive from Fresno to Visalia, California every week to visit Clevenger, although Clevenger eventually stopped recognizing him and lost the ability to speak.

Satoshi Hirayama died on September 15, 2021, at the age of 91.

== See also ==
- Nisei Baseball Research Project
