= Kenichi Zenimura =

Japanese baseball player and manager

- shortstop, second baseman, catcher, pitcher
- Born: Kenichiro Zenimura; January 25, 1900; Hiroshima, Japan
- Died: November 13, 1968 (aged 68); Fresno, California, United States
- Batted: Both Threw: Right

Oahu-Service League debut
- 1919

Last appearance
- 1955

Teams
- Hawaiian Asahi, Mills High School, Fresno Athletic Club (Nisei baseball team), Gila River (AZ) All-Stars

Kenichi Zenimura (January 25, 1900 – November 13, 1968) was a Japanese-American baseball player, manager, and promoter. He had a long career with semiprofessional Japanese-American baseball leagues in the western United States and Hawaii; these leagues were very active and popular from about 1900 to 1941. He is also noted for the successful barnstorming tours he organized that brought famed players such as Babe Ruth and Lou Gehrig to the west coast and to Japan for exhibition games in the 1920s and 1930s. Along with most Japanese-Americans living on the west coast of the United States, during World War II he was incarcerated with his family in an internment camp. Their camp was the Gila River War Relocation Center in Arizona. There he led construction of a complete baseball field including spectator stands, and he organized baseball leagues for the internees. These leagues were important both to the morale of the internees and to building relationships with nearby Arizona residents. Zenimura has been called the "Father of Japanese American Baseball".

== Life and career ==
Zenimura was born January 25, 1900, in Hiroshima, Japan and his family moved to Honolulu, Hawaii shortly afterwards. He first played baseball at Mid-Pacific Institute formerly the Mills Institute for Boys. In 1920 he moved to Fresno, where he played baseball on Japanese-American and previously all-white teams.

Many baseball historians believe he earned his titles for his remarkable career as a player (he excelled at all nine positions), manager (of Japanese-American league teams and European American teams in the Twilight leagues for older players), and international ambassador of the game (he led tours to Japan in 1924, 1927 and 1937).

In addition to organizing barnstorming tours to Japan, Zenimura was instrumental in the negotiations that led to Babe Ruth's visit to Japan in 1934. Several years earlier, in 1927, Zenimura also helped arrange a barnstorming tour to Japan for the Negro-league All-Star Philadelphia Royal Giants, led by Hall of Famers Biz Mackey and Andy Cooper.

During World War II, Zenimura and 120,000 other Japanese-Americans were sent to internment camps across the southwest United States, as directed by Executive Order 9066, signed by President Franklin Delano Roosevelt, on February 19, 1942.

Zenimura and his family were interned in Arizona on the Gila River Indian Reservation at the Gila River War Relocation Center. Almost immediately upon arrival at Gila River, and with support from the camp director Leroy Bennett, Zenimura built a baseball field and established a 32-team league. Baseball at Gila River gave Japanese-Americans a sense of pride, hope and normalcy, making life bearable during their unjust incarceration. With the closing of Butte Camp at Gila River, Zenimura field officially closed on November 10, 1945.

Zenimura returned to Fresno, California, and continued to play competitive ball until the age of 55. In the early-to-mid-1950s, Zenimura was instrumental in negotiating the professional baseball contracts of several Japanese-American players in the Central League and Pacific League including contracts for Satoshi "Fibber" Hirayama and his own sons Howard Kenso Zenimura and Harvey Kenshi Zenimura. The three later played in Japan for the Hiroshima Carp baseball team.

Kenichi Zenimura continued to manage until his death in an automobile accident on November 13, 1968, in Fresno, California.

== Legacy ==
Zenimura was the principal subject of the 2004 documentary Diamonds in the Rough: Zeni and the Legacy of Japanese-American Baseball; the documentary includes on-screen commentary by Pat Morita, a noted actor who had also been incarcerated at the Gila River camp during World War II.

During the 18th Annual Cooperstown Symposium on Baseball and American Culture (2006), a campaign was launched to establish a permanent exhibit for Japanese American Baseball in the National Baseball Hall of Fame, as well as the enshrinement of the first Japanese American player. The campaign proposes that the first Japanese American player enshrined with a plaque in Cooperstown is Kenichi Zenimura, "the Father of Japanese American Baseball". At present, the wooden home plate from Zenimura field is on display at the Hall of Fame.

Zenimura was inducted into the Baseball Reliquary's Shrine of the Eternals in 2006.

The 2007 fictional film American Pastime (2007) about baseball in the Topaz Internment Camp was inspired by Zenimura's experience.

In 2011, baseball historian Bill Staples, Jr. published a biography Kenichi Zenimura, Japanese American Baseball Pioneer. In 2013, Marissa Moss and illustrator Yuko Shimizu published Barbed Wire Baseball: How One Man Brought Hope to the Japanese Internment Camps of WWII, which is a book for young readers about baseball at the Gila River Internment Camp.

== See also ==
- Nisei Baseball Research Project
