= James Takemori =

American judoka (1926-2015)

James Haruyuki Takemori (Japanese: 竹森 晴行, February 3, 1926 – May 15, 2015) was an American judoka and World War II veteran.

== US Army ==
Takemori served in the all Japanese American, 442nd Infantry Regiment (United States) in World War II. The 442nd, 100th Infantry Battalion, and the Military Intelligence Service were jointly awarded a Congressional Gold Medal (highest civilian honor bestowed by the United States Congress) for their efforts in World War II. Takemori would visit President Obama in February 2014 as part of this honor. James Takemori ultimately retired from the US Army.

== Judo ==
Takemori began practicing judo in 1937. He founded the Washington Judo Club with Donn Draeger and taught there from the end of World War II. The club became the largest in the area and while there he would reach 9th dan in judo (one of the handful of Americans to reach that rank). James Takemori was one of the founders of the Judo Black Belt Federation which became the United States Judo Federation. By 1965, he was considered one of the top 15 judo black belts in America. He served as a coach for the 1964 US Olympic judo bronze medalist Jim Bregman and served as a coach for the US men's and women's national teams. He served on selection committees for the US men's and women's national and international teams. He served as a coach for other US Teams as well including the Southern US Team. Takemori utilized his influence in getting Allen Coage named to the US 1976 Olympic Team in the open weight class where he won a bronze medal. It was under Takemori's leadership that the US Women won three bronze medals in the first women's Worlds Championships in judo. He served as the USJF Juniors chairman. He also served as Chairman of the AAU Junior Judo Program.

== Personal life ==
During World War II, following the signing of Executive Order 9066, he was sent with his brother Edwin to the Gila River War Relocation Center in Arizona. He eventually joined the US Army. He has four daughters Robin, Teri, Miki and Chrissy. His daughter Teri Takemori is married to Jason Morris. In 2004, Takemori received Order of the Rising Sun, Gold and Silver Rays. The Order of the Rising Sun is the third highest order bestowed by the Japanese government, however it is generally the highest ordinarily conferred order (the others two are reserved for heads of state and politicians). He died at the age of 89 on May 15, 2015.
