= Nisei Baseball Research Project =

American non-profit-organization

The Nisei Baseball Research Project (NBRP) is a non-profit 501(c)(3) organization documenting, preserving and exhibiting history of Japanese American baseball. It was founded by Kerry Yo Nakagawa, the author of Through a Diamond: 100 Years of Japanese American Baseball. The NBRP's mission is to bring awareness and education about Japanese American Concentration Camps during World War II, through the prism of their multimedia projects and baseball. Also to recognize the many prewar Issei and Nisei ballplayers that never got an opportunity to play in Major League Baseball because of the 'color line' and their contribution as our American Baseball Ambassadors in the early 1920s and 1930s in Japan, Korea and Manchukuo, China. These ballplayers also kept the All-American Pastime alive during their incarceration during World War II as they played 'behind barbed wire' and again were denied of professional MLB careers.

The project began on May 4, 1996, at the Fresno Museum as the first exhibit to display the photos, memorabilia, artifacts, and text history of the Nikkei in baseball. The exhibit covers the pre-war, Japanese Internment, and post-war periods and the legacy of the legends of Japanese American baseball. On July 19, the National Japanese American Historical Society co-sponsored the exhibit to venues in San Francisco, Oakland, and San Jose. On July 20, a Tribute to the Legends of the Nisei Baseball League was held before 50,000 fans at Candlestick Park. CNN News, Japan Baseball Weekly, the San Francisco Chronicle, the San Jose Mercury News, National Public Radio, and KNBR all covered this event.

The exhibit has been featured at the National Baseball Hall of Fame and Museum in Cooperstown New York, the California State Capitol Museum, the Arizona Hall of Fame Museum, the Portland Hall of Fame Museum in Oregon, the Four Rivers Cultural Center & Museum in Los Angeles, the San Diego Hall of Champions Sports Museum, and the Fresno Metropolitan Museum. Internationally, the exhibit was on display at the Japanese Baseball Hall of Fame in Tokyo.

In 2000, the Nisei Baseball Research Project produced a 35-minute documentary film, entitled Diamonds in the Rough: The Legacy of Japanese American Baseball, which was produced by Chip Taylor and narrated by Pat Morita. NBRP has co-produced two curriculums through the Stanford Program of International and Cross Cultural Education and produced the dramatic narrative film American Pastime released by Warner Bros. in 2007.

== See also ==
- Kenichi Zenimura
- Satoshi Hirayama
