= Paul Osumi =

Paul Sutekichi Osumi (大角 捨吉 ポール, Osumi Sutekichi Paul; June 15, 1905 – April 8, 1996) was a Christian minister in Hawaii. He is best known for his column in the Hawaii Hochi and the Honolulu Advertiser, "Today's Thought".

== Early life ==
Osumi was born on June 15, 1905, in Kusatsu, Hiroshima, Japan. He immigrated to Hawaii in 1918, and attended Mid-Pacific Institute. He continued his education at the University of Hawaii, where he wrote for the school newspaper, the Ka Leo O Hawaii. He then earned a master's degree in theology at the University of Southern California. After graduating in 1936, he returned to Hawaii and became the minister at the Lihue Christian Church.

After Pearl Harbor was attacked, Osumi was arrested and incarcerated on Sand Island, supposedly because he regularly communicated with the Japanese Consulate in Honolulu. However, he insisted that he only wrote to them to help people with dual Japanese-American citizenship expatriate. During the war he was incarcerated at the Angel Island Detention Facility, the Lordsburg Internment Camp, and Gila River War Relocation Center, where he was reunited with his wife, Janet, and two sons. His family had decided to join him in Gila River in order to care for him after he contracted pleurisy.

== Post-war ==
The Osumi family returned to Hawaii in December 1945. Osumi returned to the church and served at the Waialua United Church of Christ and the Ewa Community Church. In 1954, he became the head minister of Nuuanu Congregational Church. During his tenure, the Nuuanu Congregational Church became the first church to perform Christian wedding ceremonies in Japanese for Japanese tourists.

Osumi began writing his well-known column, "Today's Thought" in 1957. "Today's Thought" was a non-denominational, inspirational column that was typically about 60 words long. He began publishing collections of them in 1966.

Osumi retired from the church in 1975, but was called back to continue ministering for another five years. He retired a second time in 1980. Osumi died on April 8, 1996.

== Bibliography ==
- Osumi, Paul (2002). Today's Thought (volume 1-3). Honolulu, HI: Mutual Publishing.
