= Japanese-Americans and return migration =

Migration of Japanese Americans to Japan

Japanese Americans have been returning to their ancestorial homeland for years as a form of return migration. With a history of being racially discriminated against, the anti-immigration actions the United States government forced onto Japan, and the eventual internment of Japanese Americans (immigrants and citizens alike), return migration was often seen as a better alternative. Although it is hard to accurately calculate how many Japanese Americans now reside in Japan, as the Japanese government doesn't collect data on return migration through ethnic or racial background, it is estimated to be more than the amount of South American Japanese, which numbers 278,414 as of 1999.

== Japanese-American timeline ==
=== Immigration ===
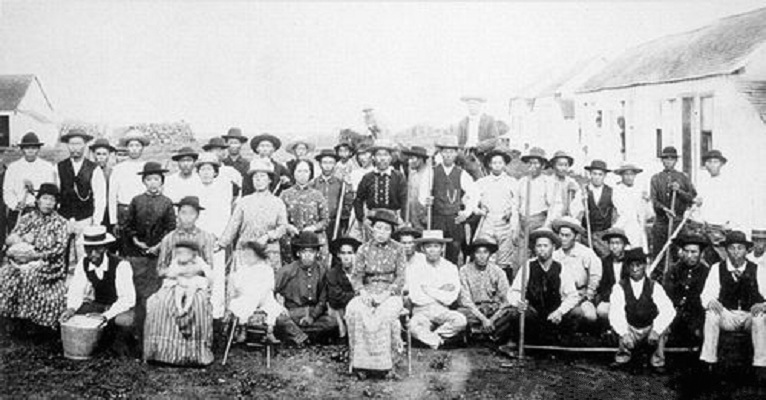
Early Japanese Immigrants in Hawaii

Individuals from Japan started to immigrate to lands that would become the United States as early as 1868 (Hawaii). The Issei, the "first generation," would touch down in the United States in California in 1869. Legal barriers and restrictions against the Chinese, in the Chinese Exclusion Act, led to an increase in labor demand in the U.S. in the 1880s. Following this and the acute times of the Meiji Restoration period, a wave of Japanese men and women would leave their homeland for the United States. At the start of the 20th century, a long-lasting surge of immigration took place, in which more than 100,000 individuals from Japan came to the United States, congregating in mostly Hawaii and the Pacific coast. These migrants came for mostly economic reasons and worked in labor-intensive jobs. The original wave of Japanese Americans worked as farmers, and laborers, in mines, railroads, factories, and fishing boats.

Restrictive immigration laws like the 1907 Gentlemen's Agreement, the Immigration Act of 1917, and the Immigration Act of 1924 effectively ended most avenues for Japanese immigration to the United States. With the lack of new immigrants permitted to enter the U.S. post-1924, almost all Japanese Americans (pre Immigration and Nationality Act of 1965) were Nisei (ethnically Japanese born abroad). Racial discrimination and prejudice led the Japanese American community to become isolated from much of the rest of the country. Anti-Japanese groups emerged, advocating for discriminatory measures such as school segregation that excluded Asian children, including Japanese Americans, from enrolling in predominantly white schools. They also advocated for banning the entry of picture brides, halting further immigration from Japan, promoting policies to deny Asians the right to American citizenship, and amending the federal Constitution to eliminate birthright citizenship for children whose parents were not of an eligible race for citizenship.

== Return migration ==
Return migration is the process of an individual returning back to their country of origin to settle. There are two forms of return migration, the first being a voluntary return, and the second being a forced return.

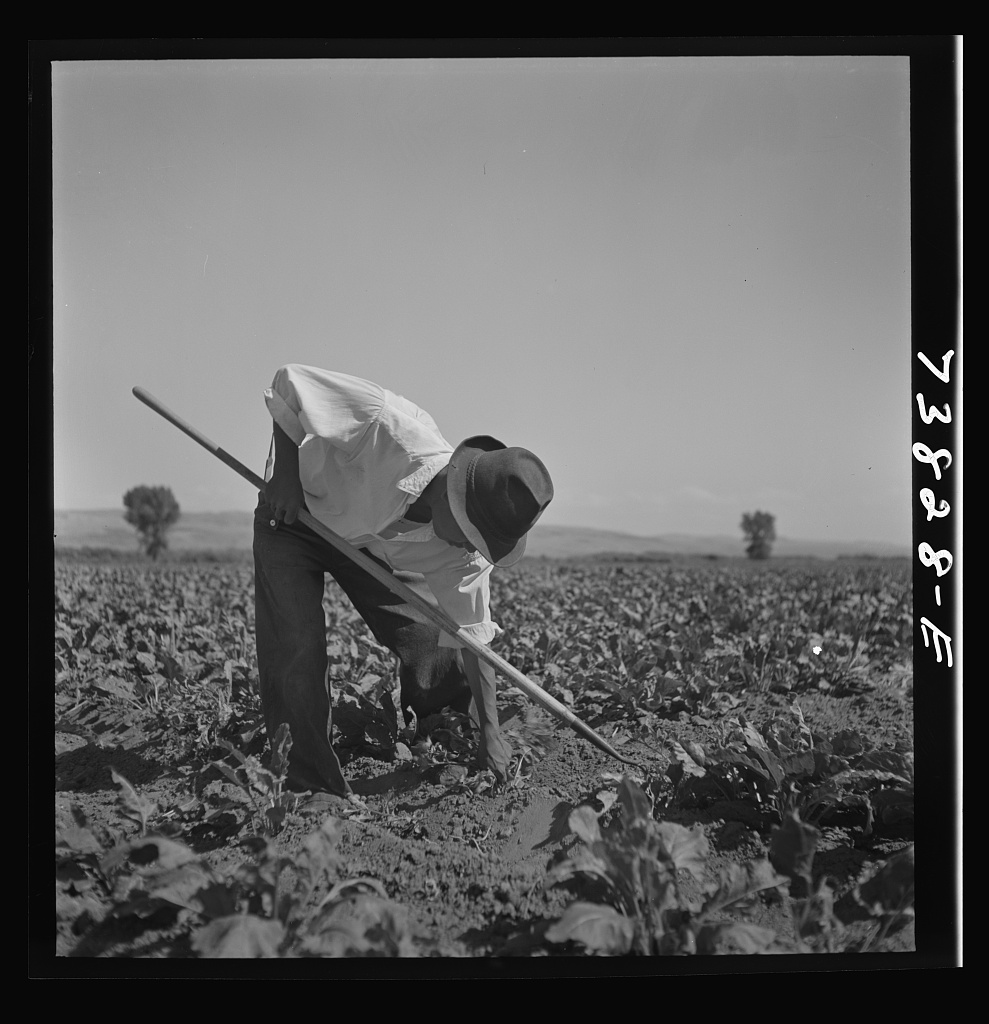
"Shelley, Idaho (vicinity). Japanese-American hoeing." An example of occupational work that early Japanese Americans participated in. The highest amount of return migrants come from farm labor.

Before WW2 a majority of Japanese immigrants did not stay in the United States. According to immigration records, 288,010 Japanese immigrated to the U.S., while 245,870 returned back to Japan. Notably, after the 1924 Immigration Act was passed, an immense return migration of Japanese individuals took place. The overrepresented Japanese male immigrants (two males to one female in 1920) could no longer bring their spouses to the United States. An estimated net out-migration of Japanese Americans amounted to more than 27,000. Alien land laws barred Japanese Immigrants, who were already not allowed to become naturalized, from purchasing or leasing out farmland. Because of this, a selective return migration took place. Of those who reported their occupation, 85% of the return migrants worked as domestic workers, farm laborers, and nonfarm laborers. The selective return migration challenges the preconceived notion of the 'model minority,' as those that returned were more likely in lower-skilled occupational work.

=== Internment ===
For those remaining in the United States, wartime hysteria and racial prejudice would disrupt daily life. Following the Japanese Empire's attack on Pearl Harbor, on February 19, 1942, President Franklin D. Roosevelt signed Executive Order 9066. This order gave the military the authority to remove individuals of Japanese ancestry from any deemed military zone. Within the next six months, about 120,000 Japanese Americans were forcibly relocated to relocation centers or internment camps.

Many Euro-Americans, and others, took advantage of the situation by offering the Japanese Americans incredibly low and unreasonable sums to purchase their possessions. Homes, businesses, and land worth several thousands of dollars were purchased extraordinarily under the market.

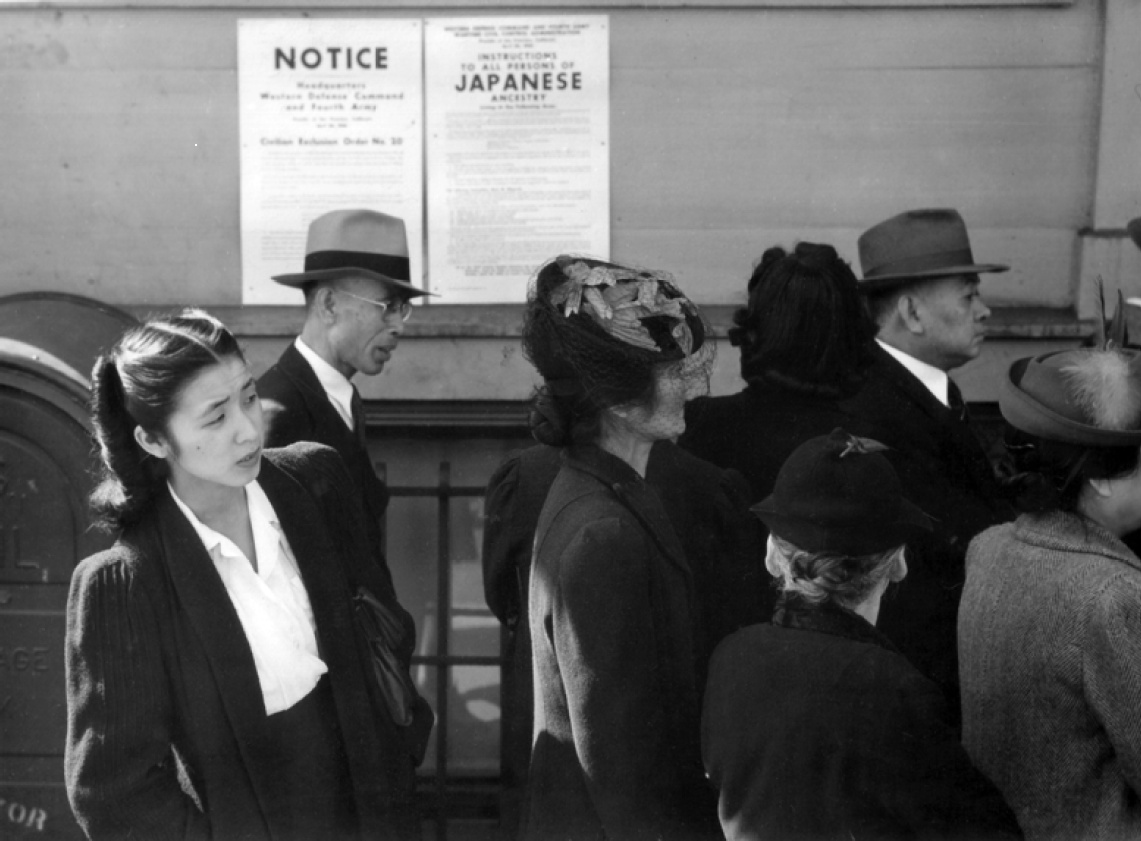
Japanese Americans being sent to Internment Camps, 1942

There were 10 internment camps set up in remote areas across the United States. Jerome and Rowher were in Arkansas, Minidoka in Idaho, Topaz in Utah, Poston and Gila River in Arizona, Granada in Colorado, Tule Lake and Manzanar in California, and Heart Mountain in Wyoming. These camps would be shut down near the end of WW2 and their internees to be set free, to return to wherever they could.

During the WW2 era (1943–1946), there were an estimated 20,000 Japanese Americans who voluntarily applied to leave the United States for Japan. They differ among the individuals, but many Issei found returning to Japan to be better than living in the U.S., where racism and discrimination were rampant along with the prospect (and eventual) internment. Along with repatriating Issei, a smaller amount of Nisei (who had never been to Japan) also left the U.S. for the Japanese Empire. These individuals had to renounce their U.S. citizenship. In the end, only 4,724 left their internment camps for Japan. Many of these individuals would end up returning to the United States at a later date. The decision to repatriate was complex and varied among individuals, influenced by factors such as cultural ties, familial obligations, and disillusionment with the U.S. government’s treatment of Japanese Americans. For Issei, returning to Japan often represented a chance to reconnect with their homeland and escape the systemic injustices they faced in America. For Nisei, however, the decision was more fraught, as many had been born and raised in the U.S. and had limited connections to Japan.

== Differences from Japanese Brazilian return migration ==
In light of the U.S. 1924 Immigration Act and a booming Brazilian coffee plantation, the Japanese government promoted emigration to Brazil. From the 1920s to the 1930s, Japanese individuals flocked to Brazil (and other South American countries) In both the United States and Brazil, the Japanese community has enjoyed being coined the term "model minority." These Japanese immigrants have carved out economic and social success within their new homelands. Despite this, Japanese immigrants living abroad have found cultural reasons to return to their ancestorial homeland.

During the 1980s, Brazil had an economic crisis called the "lost decade". With the dire straights of the Brazilian economy, Japanese Brazilians looked at their prospects elsewhere. At the same time Brazil's economy was struggling, Japan was reaping the benefits of its post-war economic miracle. Becoming the second-strongest economy in the world, wages, investments, and economic prospects were some of the highest in the entire world. These reasons contributed to the shift in immigration trends, as Japanese Brazilians, Nikkeijin migrants, returned to their ancestral homelands. In modern times, there are about 250,000 Brazilian residents living in Japan.

Much more research and writing has covered Japanese Brazilian return migration compared to Japanese American return migration. In the little comparative research, considerable differences in the treatment of the return migrants are documented. Japanese Brazilians are subject to ethnic and socioeconomic marginalization compared to Japanese Americans who enjoy a more transnational and seamless transition into their ancestorial nation. In response to the hostility faced in Japan, a defensive and nationalistic Brazilian identity has come in connection to the discrimination. The internal prestige of the United States allows those returning Japanese American migrants to reap the rewards of their nation's global position.

== Japan's modern ethnic return migration policies ==
Ethnic return migration is the return of the second generation and later to their ancestral homelands. In more recent times, Japan (and other Asian nations) have found themselves promoting forms of ethnic return migration, as they face population shrinkage through decreasing birthrates and an aging population. In 1989, Japan revised its Immigration Control and Refugee Recognition Act to create a new visa category, "long-term resident" (teijusha), allowing ethnic Japanese up to the third generation (with at least one Japanese grandparent) to legally reside in Japan for one to three years, with renewability. Unlike occupational visas, this visa is status-based, requiring no institutional guarantor and enabling flexibility in activities like work or study. It was interpreted as a way to legalize the migration of ethnic returnees for unskilled labor while simultaneously penalizing the hiring of undocumented foreign workers.

In 2009, Japan amended the Immigration Control Act to further decrease the number of term resident visa holders, including Japanese Americans. The changes extended the maximum period of stay from three years to five years, introduced a "presumed permit of re-entry" system to simplify re-entry processes for those leaving Japan for less than a year, and reduced the bureaucratic and financial burdens associated with maintaining visa status. These amendments aimed to encourage ethnic return migrants to remain in Japan longer and contribute more effectively to the economy. The Japanese government has not explicitly targeted Japanese Americans or ethnic Japanese in industrialized countries for long-term resident visas. The 1990 Immigration Control Act primarily focused on Japanese Brazilians as a source of unskilled labor. While later policies have shifted toward attracting skilled labor, they have not specifically addressed Japanese Americans or other skilled ethnic Japanese populations abroad. Consequently, Japanese Americans have made limited use of the long-term resident visa, often opting for other visa types like "Permanent Resident," "Spouse or Child of a Japanese National," or "Specialist in Humanities/International Services," which align better with their circumstances and opportunities in Japan.
