= Sam Nakagama =

Japanese-American businessman, economist and financial advisor (1925–2006)

- Born: Delano, CA
- Died: March 8, 2006; Rumson, NJ
- Occupations: Economist, businessman
- Military career
- Branch: U.S. Army 1942-1948

Sam Isamu Nakagama (1925–2006) was a Japanese-American businessman, economist, and financial advisor. He founded Wall Street’s Nakagama Wallace, Inc. Nakagama also served in the U.S. Army during World War II.

== Biography ==
Nakagama was a first generation American born in Delano, California, to Japanese immigrants. Following the outbreak of World War II, his parents were incarcerated in the Jerome and Rohwer internment camps in Arkansas, while he served in the U.S. Army. Nakagama himself was incarcerated first at the Fresno Assembly Center, and then the Jerome War Relocation Center.

From 1945 to 1948, Nakagama became the sociologist and a pollster at General Douglas MacArthur’s post-war headquarters in Tokyo, Japan before his discharge. In 1961, he was employed at Citibank, which was then known as First National City Bank. Nakagama was the principal writer of the bank's monthly economic letter. By 1967, he became the chief economist and vice president of Argus Research Corp. He left the company and joined Kidder, Peabody & Co., a leading Wallstreet banking firm, eventually becoming the company's vice president and chief economist.

Nakagama became a Wall Street economist and commented on American economic policies such as those based on the decline of crude oil prices during the 1990s. He testified before the United States Congress on fiscal policy on numerous occasions. He published articles on economics for publications such as the New York Times.

Nakagama married Mary Frances Nakagama. They had two daughters. Nakagama died on March 8, 2006, at Rumson, New Jersey.
