= Horace Yomishi Mochizuki =

American mathematician known for his contributions to group theory

Horace Yomishi Mochizuki (18 May 1937 – 9 June 1989) was an American mathematician known for his contributions to group theory. Mochizuki received a special award from the National Science Foundation for his work on the Burnside problem.

== Biography ==
Mochizuki was born in California on 18 May 1937 from parents of Japanese ancestry. Following the Imperial Japan's attack on Pearl Harbor, President Roosevelt authorized on 19 February 1942 the deportation and internment of Japanese Americans with Executive Order 9066 which allowed regional military commanders to designate "military areas" from which "any or all persons may be excluded". This authority was used to declare that all people of Japanese ancestry were excluded from the West Coast, including all of California and parts of Oregon, Washington, and Arizona, except for those in government camps. Mochizuki was interned with his family in the Jerome War Relocation Center in Arkansas. After World War II, the family moved back to Madera, California, where Horace won the Madera County spelling bee in 1951.

Mochizuki received his doctoral degree from the University of Washington with a dissertation work entitled "Finitistic homological dimensions and duality theory for rings". He began teaching at University of California, Santa Barbara in 1965.

Mochizuki died on 9 June 1989 from cancer of the pancreas. His wife, Keiko, committed suicide two days later by drowning in the Pacific Ocean. They left behind two children (Emilia and Selina).

== Work ==
At the beginning of his academic career, Mochizuki's worked on ring theory. He started to cooperate with Seymour Bachmuth on group theory. For his work on Burnside groups, Mochizuki received a special award from the National Science Foundation for "projects of high scientific merit involving scientists with a record of outstanding research accomplishments..."

Mochizuki is known for a non-commutative version of "Kolchin's Theorem" that solved a theorem of Ivan Kaplansky and for his work on automorphism groups with Bachmuth.
