= Kenneth Yasuda =

American writer (1914–2002)

- Born: June 23, 1914
- Died: January 26, 2002 (aged 87)
- Education: University of Washington, Tokyo University
- Occupation: Academic writer
- Writing career
- Genres: Poetry, Poetry Criticism
- Notable works: The Japanese Haiku: Its Essential Nature, History, and Possibilities in English, with Selected Examples

Kenneth Yasuda (June 23, 1914 – January 26, 2002) was a Japanese-American scholar and translator.

== Life and career ==
Yasuda was born on June 23, 1914, in Auburn, California. His poetry studies at the University of Washington were interrupted by World War II, and he was interned at the Tule Lake War Relocation Center following the signing of Executive Order 9066. He was later transferred to the Jerome War Relocation Center in 1943. After the war, he returned to the University of Washington where he received a BA in 1945. Yasuda earned his Doctorate in Japanese Literature from Tokyo University.

== Haiku legacy ==
Yasuda's best known book is The Japanese Haiku: Its Essential Nature, History, and Possibilities in English, with Selected Examples (1957). His other books include A Pepper-pod: Classic Japanese Poems Together with Original Haiku, a collection of haiku and translations in English; Masterworks of the Noh Theater; A Lacquer Box, translation of waka and a translation of Minase Sangin Hyakuin, a 100-verse renga poem led by Sōgi and titled in English as Three Poets at Minase.

Yasuda's 1957 book consists mainly of material from his doctoral dissertation from 1955, and includes both translations from Japanese and original poems of his own in English. These had previously appeared in his book A Pepper-Pod: Classic Japanese Poems together with Original Haiku (Alfred A. Knopf, 1947). In The Japanese Haiku, Yasuda presented some Japanese critical theory about haiku, especially featuring comments by early twentieth-century poets and critics.

Yasuda's translations apply a 5–7–5 syllable count in English, with the first and third lines end-rhymed.(Yasuda observed that although rhyme, as understood in English, does not exist in the original Japanese, in translations thereof into English they should use all the poetic resources of the language).

In the same book, Yasuda contended that 'the underlying aesthetic principles that govern the arts are the same for any form in Japanese or English' and would ensure the possibilities of Haiku in English being as popular as with its Japanese audience.

In Yasuda's haiku theory the intent of the haiku is contained in the concept of a "haiku moment," 'that moment of absolute intensity when the poet's grasp of his intuition is complete so that the image lives its own life', (seventeen syllables corresponding to that 'moment', divided into three lines within 'one breath length' ). This notion of the haiku moment has been defined as 'an aesthetic moment' a timeless feeling of enlightened harmony as a poet's nature and environment are unified'The passing momentary experience that comes alive through the precise perception of the image.'

Yasuda's indirect influence was felt through the Beat writers; Jack Kerouac's The Dharma Bums appeared in 1958, with one of its main characters, Japhy Ryder (based on Gary Snyder), writing haiku.
