= Kilauea Military Camp =

Military camp on Hawai'i Island, Hawaii, U.S.

Coordinates: 19°26′01″N 155°16′26″W

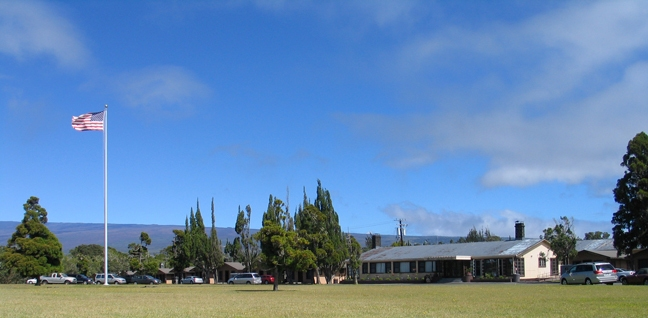
Kilauea Military Camp Front Lawn in Hawaii Volcanoes National Park, Hawaii

Kīlauea Military Camp (KMC) is operated as a Morale, Welfare and Recreation (MWR) facility on Hawai‘i Island, also known as the Big Island, in Hawaiʻi. It is located inside Hawaiʻi Volcanoes National Park. This United States Department of Defense (DoD) facility is at an elevation of 4,000 feet, within walking distance from Kilauea Volcano, the world's most active volcano.

KMC vacation resort serves U.S. soldiers (active, Reserve, and Guard), DoD employees, and their family members with lodging, dining, tours, entertainment, and recreation. Once a working military post, the one, two, and three bedroom cottages and apartments have been converted to resort lodging and offer amenities such as jetted tubs, kitchens, fireplaces, and cable TV.

== History ==
The unique partnership between KMC and the Hawaiʻi Volcanoes National Park began in 1916. A group of Hilo businessmen raised the necessary funds to build and operate a permanent camp in 1916 on land owned by Bishop Estate. The camp was to serve as a rest and relaxation facility for military troops as well a training ground for the local National Guard members. Later that same year marked the establishment of Hawaii Volcanoes National Park to preserve the natural setting and to provide a refuge to native plants and animals in August 1916.

On November 17, 1916, KMC was officially opened and many soldiers came to this one-of-a-kind site through the ensuing years. The National Park Service later acquired KMC's lease when the Territory of Hawaii turned over the land to the United States as part of the Hawaii National Park in 1921. Also in 1921, the Army acquired control of KMC. By the end of 1922, about five thousand enlisted men had visited KMC. The Camp eventually expanded to include permanent guest cottages, a post exchange, bakery, barber shop, light plant, water plant, and more.

In the 1940s, KMC served as a Japanese internment camp and a prisoner-of-war camp during World War II. Numerous dignitaries have visited KMC, including General Dwight D. Eisenhower who was the Army Chief of Staff in 1946 and later became the president of the United States. KMC was opened to all military branches in 1949 and has continued to serve the U.S. Military and DoD as a MWR site.

On June 1, 2011, KMC became one of three Armed Forces Recreation Center (ARFC) properties managed by the Hale Koa Hotel.

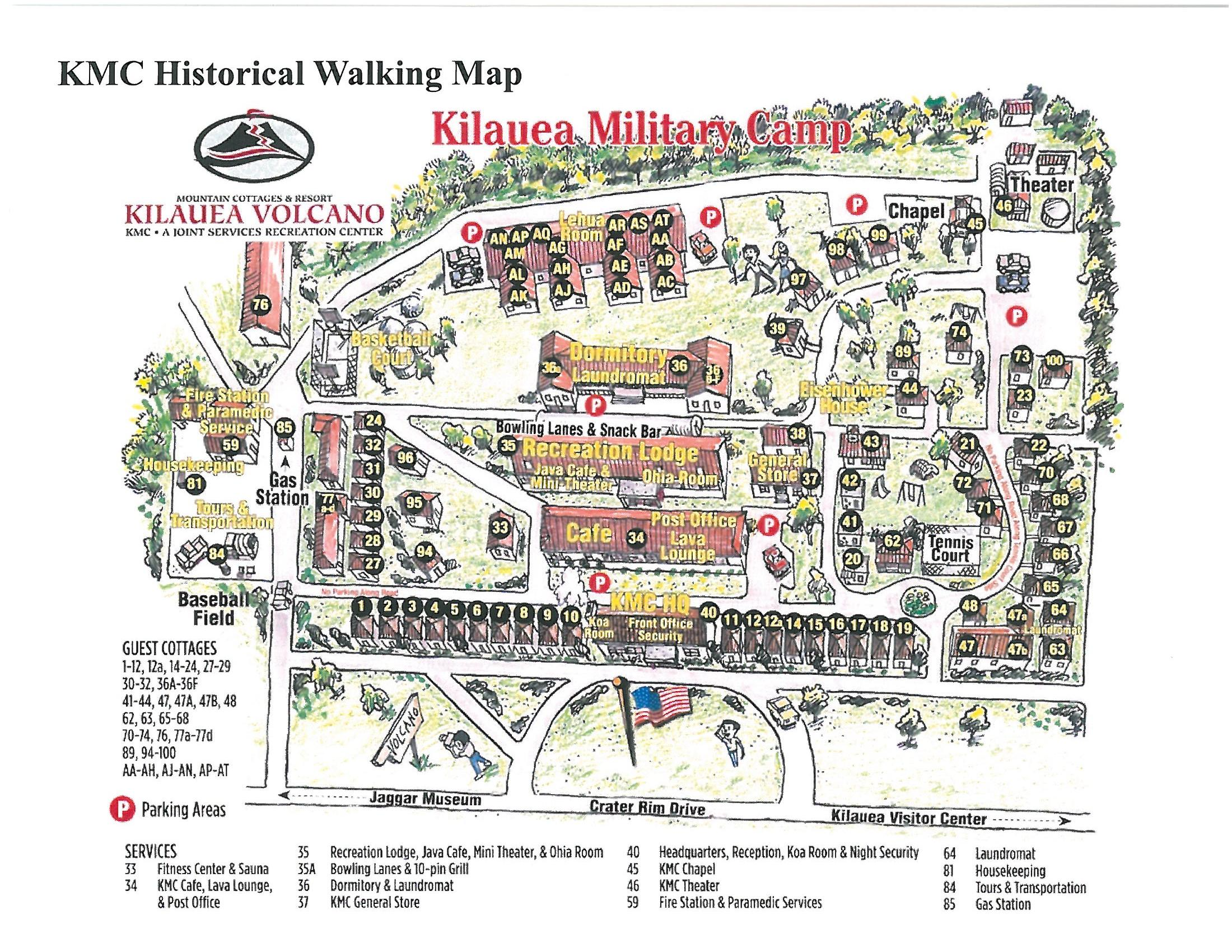
Map of KMC.

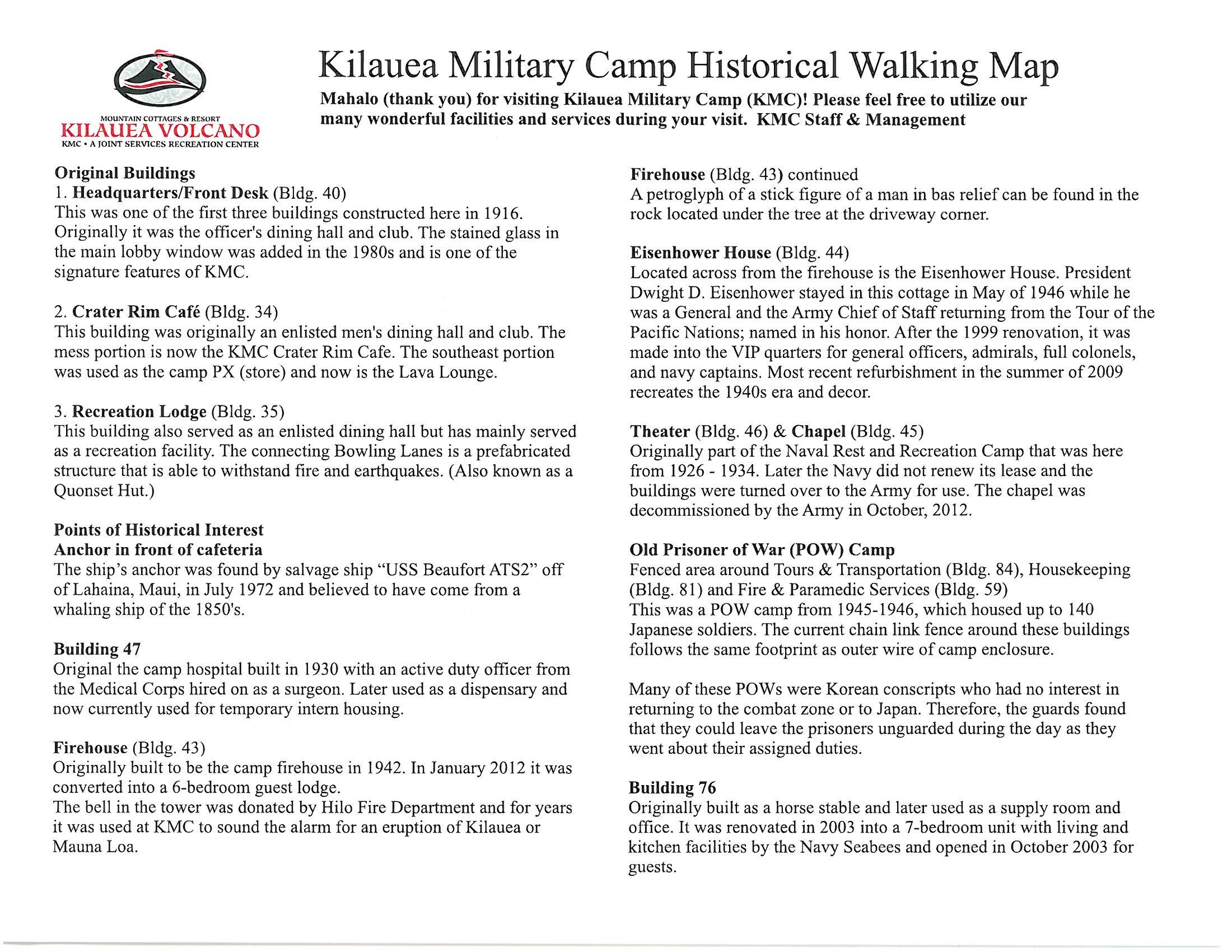
History of KMC.

== Notable Kilauea Military Camp internees ==
- George Hoshida (born 1907), a Japanese American artist who made drawings of his experience during his incarceration in three internment camps
- Otokichi Ozaki, a Japanese poet
