= Joe M. Nishimoto =

United States Army Medal of Honor recipient

Joe Maori Nishimoto
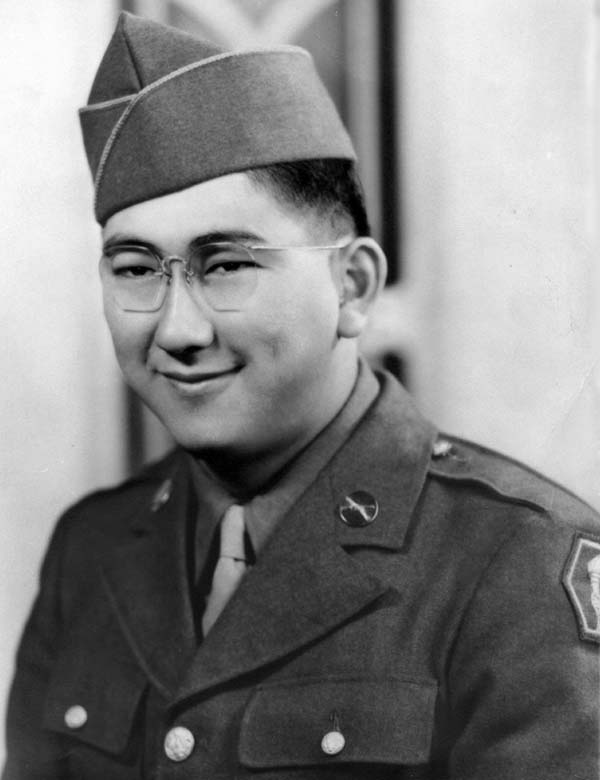
- Private First Class Joe Nishimoto
- Born: February 21, 1919; Fresno, California
- Died: November 15, 1944 (aged 25) near La Houssière, France †
- Burial place: Washington Colony Cemetery, Fresno, California
- Military career
- Allegiance: United States of America
- Branch: United States Army
- Service years: 1943 - 1944
- Rank: Private First Class
- Unit: 442nd Regimental Combat Team
- Conflicts: World War II
- Awards: Medal of Honor

Private First Class Joe Maori Nishimoto (Japanese: 西本 真織, February 21, 1919 – November 15, 1944) was a United States Army soldier. He is best known for receiving the Medal of Honor because of his actions in World War II.

== Early life ==
Nishimoto was born in California to Japanese immigrant parents. He was a Nisei, which means that he was a second generation Japanese-American.

He was interned at the Jerome War Relocation Center in Arkansas, following the signing of Executive Order 9066.

== Soldier ==
Nishimoto joined the US Army in October 1943.

Nishimoto volunteered to be part of the all-Nisei 100th Infantry Battalion. This army unit was mostly made up of Japanese Americans from Hawaii and the mainland.

For his actions in November 1944, Nishimoto was awarded the Army's second-highest decoration, the Distinguished Service Cross. He was killed in action on November 15, 1944.

== Medal of Honor citation ==
Nishimoto's Medal of Honor recognized his conduct in frontline fighting in France in 1944.

Private First Class Nishimoto's official Medal of Honor citation reads:

Private First Class Joe M. Nishimoto distinguished himself by extraordinary heroism in action on 7 November 1944, near La Houssiere, France. After three days of unsuccessful attempts by his company to dislodge the enemy from a strongly defended ridge, Private First Class Nishimoto, as acting squad leader, boldly crawled forward through a heavily mined and booby-trapped area. Spotting a machine gun nest, he hurled a grenade and destroyed the emplacement. Then, circling to the rear of another machine gun position, he fired his submachine gun at point-blank range, killing one gunner and wounding another. Pursuing two enemy riflemen, Private First Class Nishimoto killed one, while the other hastily retreated. Continuing his determined assault, he drove another machine gun crew from its position. The enemy, with their key strong points taken, were forced to withdraw from this sector. Private First Class Nishimoto's extraordinary heroism and devotion to duty are in keeping with the highest traditions of military service and reflect great credit on him, his unit, and the United States Army.

== Awards and decorations ==

Badge	Combat Infantryman Badge		
1st row	Medal of Honor Upgraded from Distinguished Service Cross		
2nd row	Bronze Star Medal	Purple Heart	Army Good Conduct Medal
3rd row	American Campaign Medal	European–African–Middle Eastern Campaign Medal with 1 Campaign star	World War II Victory Medal

== See also ==
- List of Medal of Honor recipients for World War II
