= Henry Sugimoto =

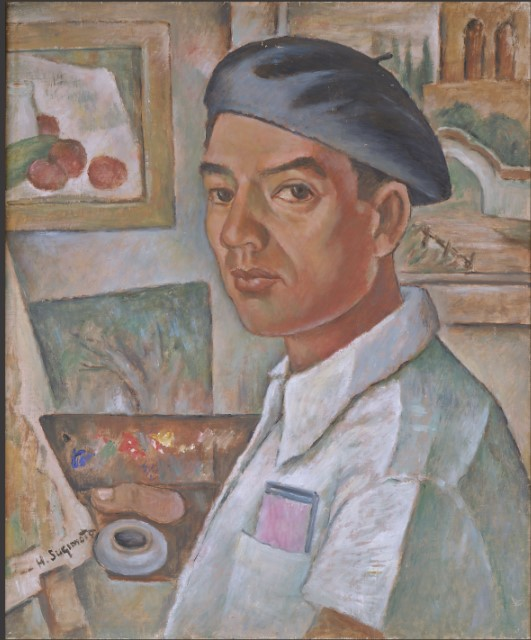
Henry Sugimoto, Self Portrait in Camp, 1943, oil on canvas, 22 x 18 in

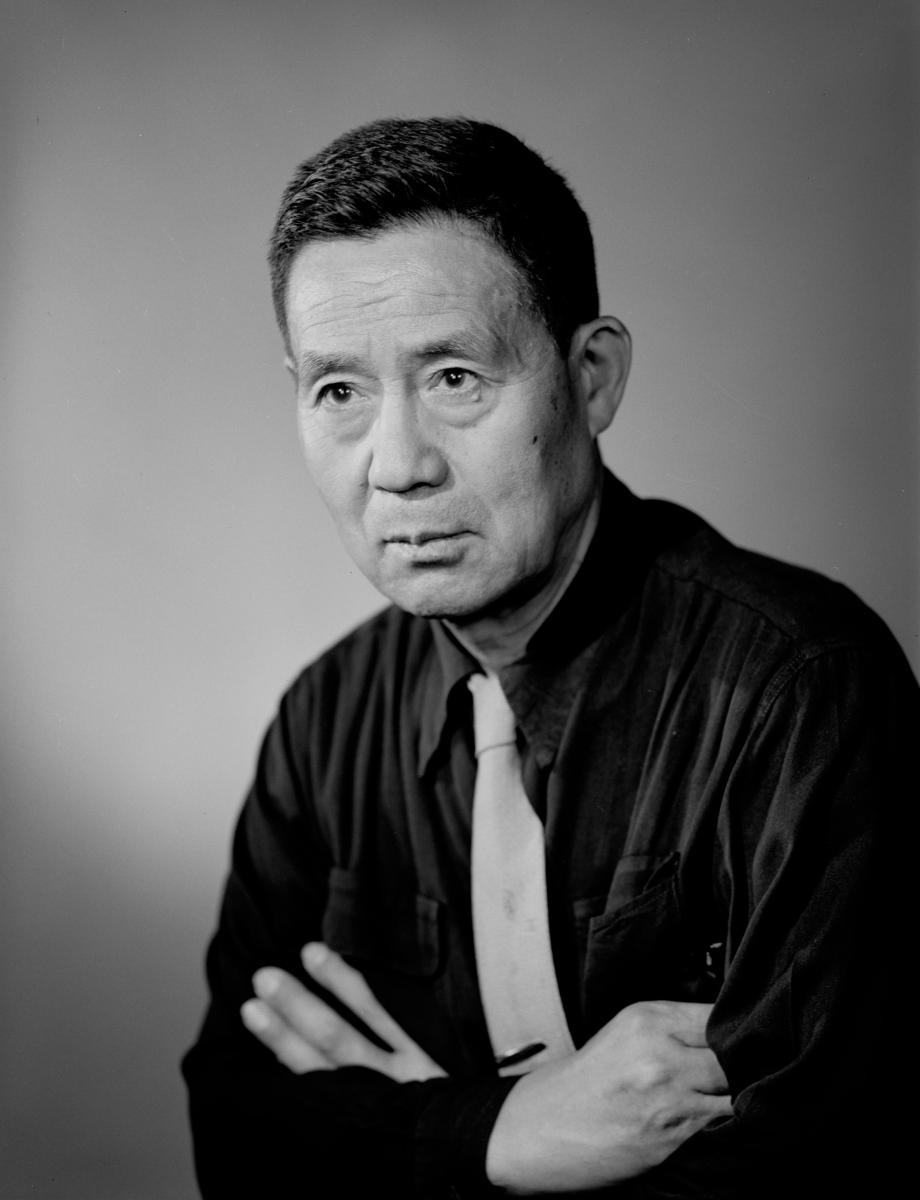
Henry Sugimoto, half-portrait, Los Angeles, California, September 1967, 4 x 5 in.

Henry Yuzuru Sugimoto (March 12, 1900 – May 8, 1990) was a Japanese-American artist, art teacher and a survivor of Japanese American Internment during World War II. Sugimoto became a naturalized citizen of the United States in 1952.

== Early life and career ==
Sugimoto was born in Wakayama in central Japan, the grandson of a displaced samurai. His father emigrated to the United States soon after he was born, and his mother followed nine years later, leaving Sugimoto and a younger brother to be raised by their maternal grandparents.

In 1919, he immigrated to the United States and changed his name to Henry, joining his parents in Hanford, California. After graduating from Hanford Union High School in 1924, he briefly attended the University of California, Berkeley before transferring to the California College of Arts and Crafts, where he studied oil painting, graduating with honors in 1928. Sugimoto continued his studies at the California School of Fine Arts (now the San Francisco Art Institute) but later that year went to France to study at the Académie Colarossi in Paris. He eventually quit the Académie and moved to the French countryside to paint landscapes; one of these paintings was accepted for exhibition at the 1931 Salon d'Automne.

Sugimoto returned from France to California in 1932. He mounted a one-man show at the California Palace of the Legion of Honor in San Francisco. This show, which was expanded in size and extended for a longer run due to its popularity, became the foundation of an evolving professional career. Sugimoto continued to exhibit his work around the Bay Area, and in 1934 he married Susie Tagawa and moved back to Hanford, where he worked in a laundry and taught art classes.

== Internment ==
Sugimoto was living in Hanford when the United States declared war on Japan after the December 1941 attack on Pearl Harbor. Following Executive Order 9066, which authorized military commanders to evict "any or all persons" from the West Coast, Sugimoto was removed with his wife and daughter to the Pinedale Assembly Center. He was later transferred to the Jerome War Relocation Center in October 1942, and again to Rohwer in June 1944, where he remained until August 1945. Soon after arriving in camp, Sugimoto was shocked by the government's treatment. Believing it was his mission as an artist to document and protest his experience, Sugimoto began painting scenes of daily life. He began painting on sheets, pillowcases and other scrap materials, hiding his early work from administrators because he feared his critical depictions of camp life would be confiscated. However, after receiving encouragement from WRA officials (who went so far as to include him in a propaganda film), he began to paint openly, creating some 100 oil paintings, watercolors and sketches during his confinement. He taught art classes to other inmates, and in February 1944 he was able to exhibit some of his camp work at the nearby Hendrix College.

== Postwar years ==
Sugimoto was released from Rohwer in 1945. He briefly returned to San Francisco to reclaim about 100 paintings he had left in storage, but found that they had been auctioned off while he was in camp. After failing to recover the proceeds from the sales, he relocated to New York, where he continued painting and worked on the side as a textile designer and book artist. During this time he illustrated books by Japanese Christian missionary Toyohiko Kagawa and Japanese American author Yoshiko Uchida.

He participated in various exhibitions, including a 1960 show of the Society of Washington Printmakers at the Smithsonian Institution, and in 1962 his work appeared at New York's Galerie Internationale. The Galerie exhibit was his first solo show in nearly twenty years, but due to a concurrent newspaper strike it received little public attention and attracted few buyers. Sugimoto was again featured at the Galerie in 1965, but this show was again largely unsuccessful. However, around this time his work began to receive renewed attention from artists and activists connected to the redress movement and the establishment of Asian American Studies programs. In 1972, two murals he had created in Topaz were highlighted in Months of Waiting, 1942-1945, an exhibition of artwork from the camps, and the Los Angeles Times reproduced both. Sugimoto began to create new woodblock prints exploring camp themes and became involved in the redress movement himself, testifying before the Commission on Wartime Relocation and Internment of Civilians in 1981. His work appeared in several exhibitions and anthologies, both American and Japanese.

Sugimoto died May 8, 1990. The Japanese American National Museum featured a major exhibition of his work in 2000, and the documentary Harsh Canvas and the book Henry Sugimoto: Painting an American Experience soon followed. His artwork is now part of the JANM and Smithsonian collections.
