= Aiko Herzig-Yoshinaga =

American civil rights activist (1924–2018)

- Born: August 5, 1924
- Died: July 18, 2018 (aged 93)
- Occupation: Political activist

Aiko Herzig-Yoshinaga (Japanese: 吉永 愛子, August 5, 1924 – July 18, 2018) was a Japanese American political activist who played a major role in the Japanese American redress movement. She was the lead researcher of the Commission on Wartime Relocation and Internment of Civilians (CWRIC), a bipartisan federal committee appointed by Congress in 1980 to review the causes and effects of the Japanese American incarceration during World War II. As a young woman, Herzig-Yoshinaga was confined in the Manzanar Concentration Camp in California, the Jerome War Relocation Center in Arkansas, and the Rohwer War Relocation Center, which is also in Arkansas. She later uncovered government documents that debunked the wartime administration's claims of "military necessity" and helped compile the CWRIC's final report, Personal Justice Denied, which led to the issuance of a formal apology and reparations for former camp inmates. She also contributed pivotal evidence and testimony to the Hirabayashi, Korematsu and Yasui coram nobis cases.

== Early years ==
Aiko Abe Louise Yoshinaga was born in Sacramento, California in 1924, the fifth of six children. Her parents, Sanji Yoshinaga and Shigeru Kinuwaki, immigrated from the Kumamoto Prefecture on Japan's island Kyushu. In 1933, Yoshinaga's family moved to Los Angeles, where her father worked as a hotel manager.

== Incarceration ==
Herzig-Yoshinaga was a high school senior at Los Angeles High School in Los Angeles when President Roosevelt issued Executive Order 9066, which authorized military commanders to designate areas from which "any or all persons may be excluded." This action led to the imprisonment of over 110,000 Japanese Americans from the West Coast and Hawai'i under the justifications of "military necessity" and "national security" as the United States became involved in World War II. Herzig-Yoshinaga was an honors student and planned to go to secretarial school after graduating. She was two months from her graduation when she was forced to leave school for the incarceration camps before receiving her diploma. She recalls her principal saying when he informed her and the other Japanese American students at her school of the situation, "You don't deserve to get your high school diplomas because your people bombed Pearl Harbor."

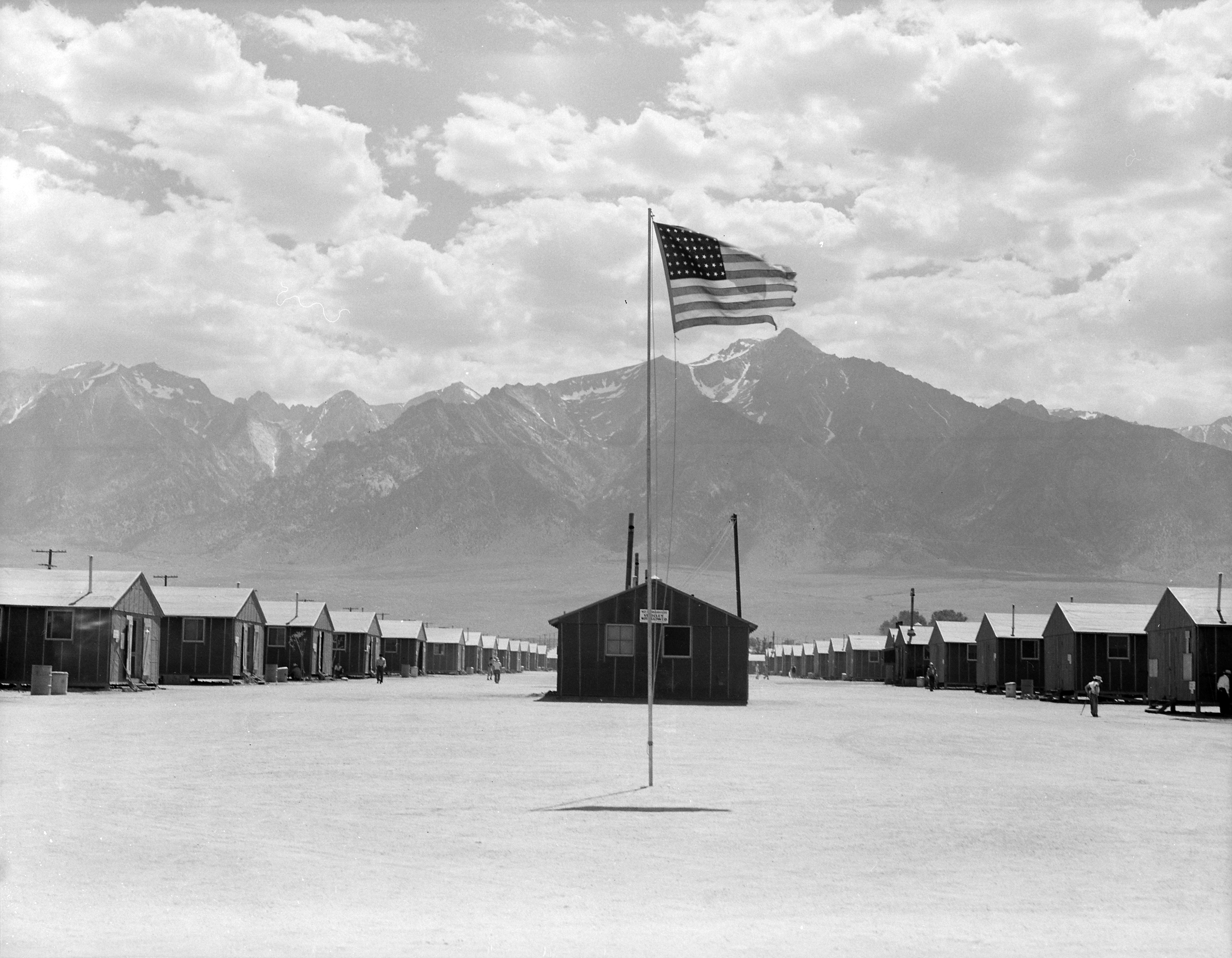
Manzanar, California 1942

Herzig-Yoshinaga was sent to Manzanar, California with her new husband, her high school sweetheart. They had eloped in order to prevent being sent to separate detention centers. She was separated from her parents and siblings who were sent to Jerome, Arkansas. She gave birth to her first child in Manzanar, and later transferred to Jerome, Arkansas to visit her father before his death. Herzig-Yoshinaga eventually divorced her husband after he was drafted into the military for World War II. Before the war's end, she also spent time in the Rohwer War Relocation Center which, like Jerome Relocation Center, is also located in Arkansas.

After the war, she received $25, left the incarceration centers, and settled in New York City with her four siblings and her mother. She remarried and had two more children before divorcing again, and took a job as a clerical worker to support her family.

== Activism ==
In the 1960s, Herzig-Yoshinaga became involved with Asian Americans for Action, a civil rights organization composed mostly of Nisei women that engaged in activism protesting the Vietnam War and nuclear research. She also joined the staff of Jazzmobile, a non-profit organization dedicated to education through jazz music based in Harlem, which helped deepen her consciousness around race and racism in the United States. In 1978, she married former Army paratrooper John "Jack" Herzig and moved to Washington, D.C. He had fought against the Japanese during World War II and until marrying Herzig-Yoshinaga, knew very little about the Japanese American incarceration.

At the prompting of her friend, author Michi Weglyn, Herzig-Yoshinaga began looking into the records of the government agencies responsible for Japanese American incarceration that had recently been made available to the public in the National Archives. Often putting in fifty- or sixty-hour weeks, she worked to retrieve and catalog thousands of significant documents over the next several years. She would bring her purse, a lunch, and her own copy machine, and kept a detailed filing system to organize the thousands of documents she accumulated and worked with.

Herzig-Yoshinaga joined the National Council for Japanese American Redress (NCJAR) in 1980 (the same year the Commission on Wartime Relocation and Internment of Civilians (CWRIC) was created) and contributed her archival research to NCJAR's class-action lawsuit seeking reparations from the government. The following year, in 1981, Herzig-Yoshinaga was hired by the CWRIC as its lead researcher, and she soon after unearthed one of the most significant pieces of evidence in the case for redress. Lieut. Gen. John L. De Witt, who had overseen the evacuation and imprisonment of Japanese Americans during the war, had written a "Final Report on Japanese Evacuation from the West Coast." Herzig-Yoshinaga found the single remaining copy of an earlier draft of the "Final Report," which explicitly stated that intelligence sources agreed Japanese Americans posed no threat to U.S. security in 1943. Additionally, while the military had claimed that there was not time to conduct hearings and determine the loyalty of individual Japanese Americans, DeWitt said in this earlier draft that time was irrelevant to his plan, and that it was "impossible" to tell Japanese Americans apart, saying "it was impossible to separate the sheep from the goats."

Herzig-Yoshinaga shared the copy of the "Final Report" with the CWRIC, NCJAR, and redress activists. The document played a large part in the CWRIC's report, Personal Justice Denied, which concluded that the incarceration of Japanese Americans was the product of "race prejudice, war hysteria, and a failure of political leadership." Additionally, thanks in large part to Herzig-Yoshinaga's discovery of this document, the convictions of Gordon Hirabayashi, Fred Korematsu, and Minoru Yasui were overturned, and the Civil Liberties Act of 1988 granted an official apology and $20,000 to each camp survivor or their heirs.

Herzig-Yoshinaga and her husband Jack later worked in the Department of Justice's Office of Redress Administration to identify Japanese Americans eligible for reparations.

== Later life ==
Herzig-Yoshinaga received her high school diploma from Los Angeles High School in 1989, along with some of her other classmates. The date on the diploma was June 26, 1942.

Aiko Herzig-Yoshinaga was widowed when Jack Herzig died in 2005.

In 2009, Herzig-Yoshinaga published a dictionary of terms related to the incarceration, where she encourages avoiding euphemisms to describe the experience of Japanese Americans during World War II such referring to the camps as "concentration camps" instead of "internment camps," given "internment's" connotation with an action that is militarily justified.

In 2011, she received the Spirit of Los Angeles award.

In 2016, Herzig was the subject of a documentary entitled Rebel with a Cause, by Janice D. Tanaka.

Aiko Herzig-Yoshinaga died in 2018, aged 93 years, in Torrance, California.

Aiko Herzig-Yoshinaga was prominently featured in the podcast produced by Rachel Maddow entitled “Burn Order” that was released in December 2025 and included archival interviews of her from years before about her critical research role and partnership with attorney Peter Irons.

== See also ==
- Commission on Wartime Relocation and Internment of Civilians
- Internment of Japanese Americans
- Japanese American redress and court cases
