= Rose Ochi =

Japanese-American attorney and civil rights activist (1938–2020)

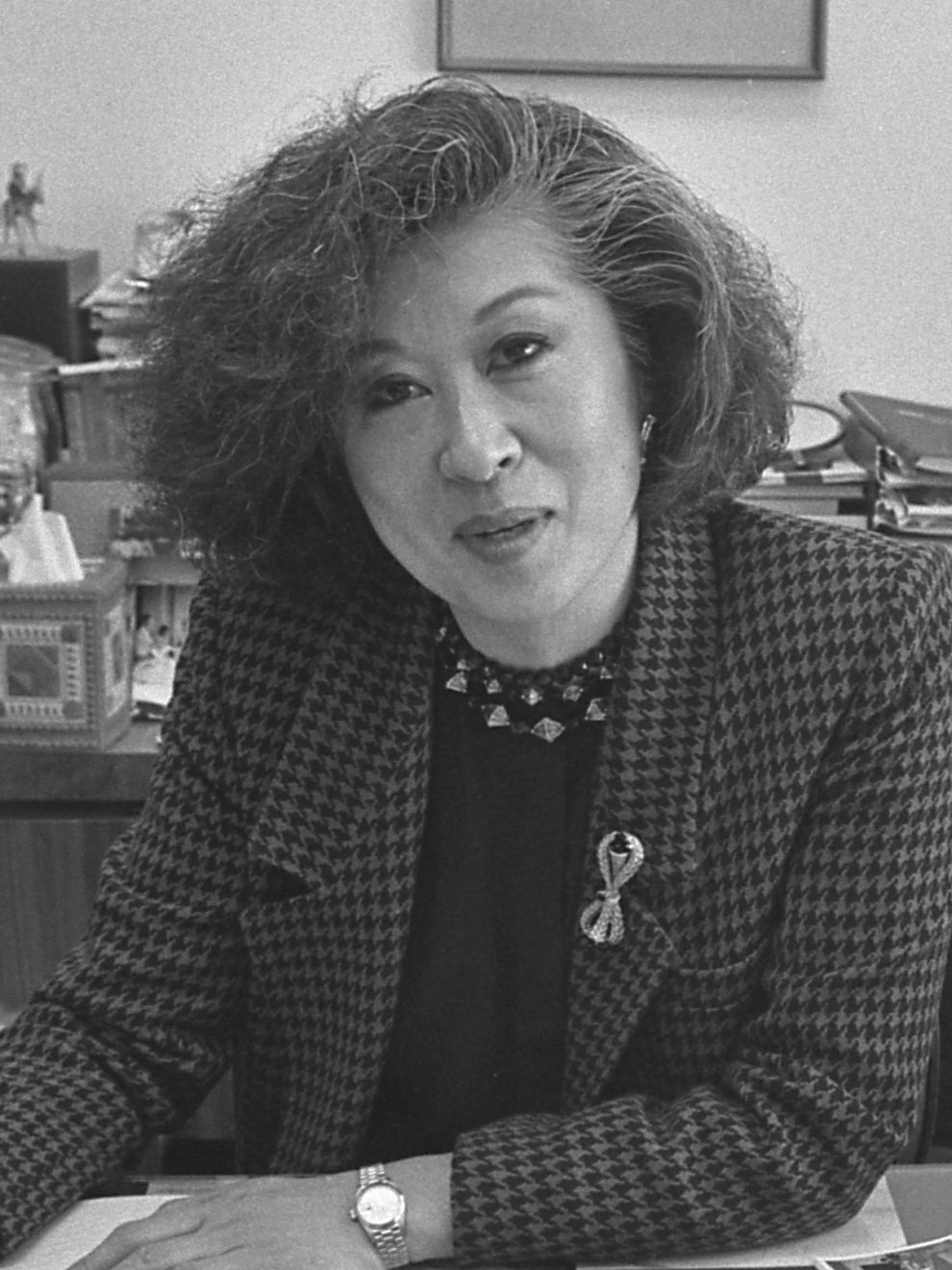
- Ochi in 1986
- Born: Takayo Matsui Ochi; December 15, 1938; East Los Angeles, California, U.S.
- Died: December 13, 2020 (aged 81); Los Angeles, California, U.S.
- Education: Theodore Roosevelt High School; University of California, Los Angeles (BA); California State University, Los Angeles (EdM); Loyola Law School (LLB); University of Southern California (JD)
- Years active: 1972–2020
- Spouse: Thomas H. Ochi (m. 1963)

Takayo "Rose" Matsui Ochi (December 15, 1938 – December 13, 2020) was a Japanese-American attorney and civil rights activist notable for fighting for the approval of the Manzanar to become a National Historic Site and being the first Asian American woman to be appointed at the United States Assistant Attorney General level by President Bill Clinton. She was also the first Asian American to be appointed to the Los Angeles Police Commission.

== Early life and education ==
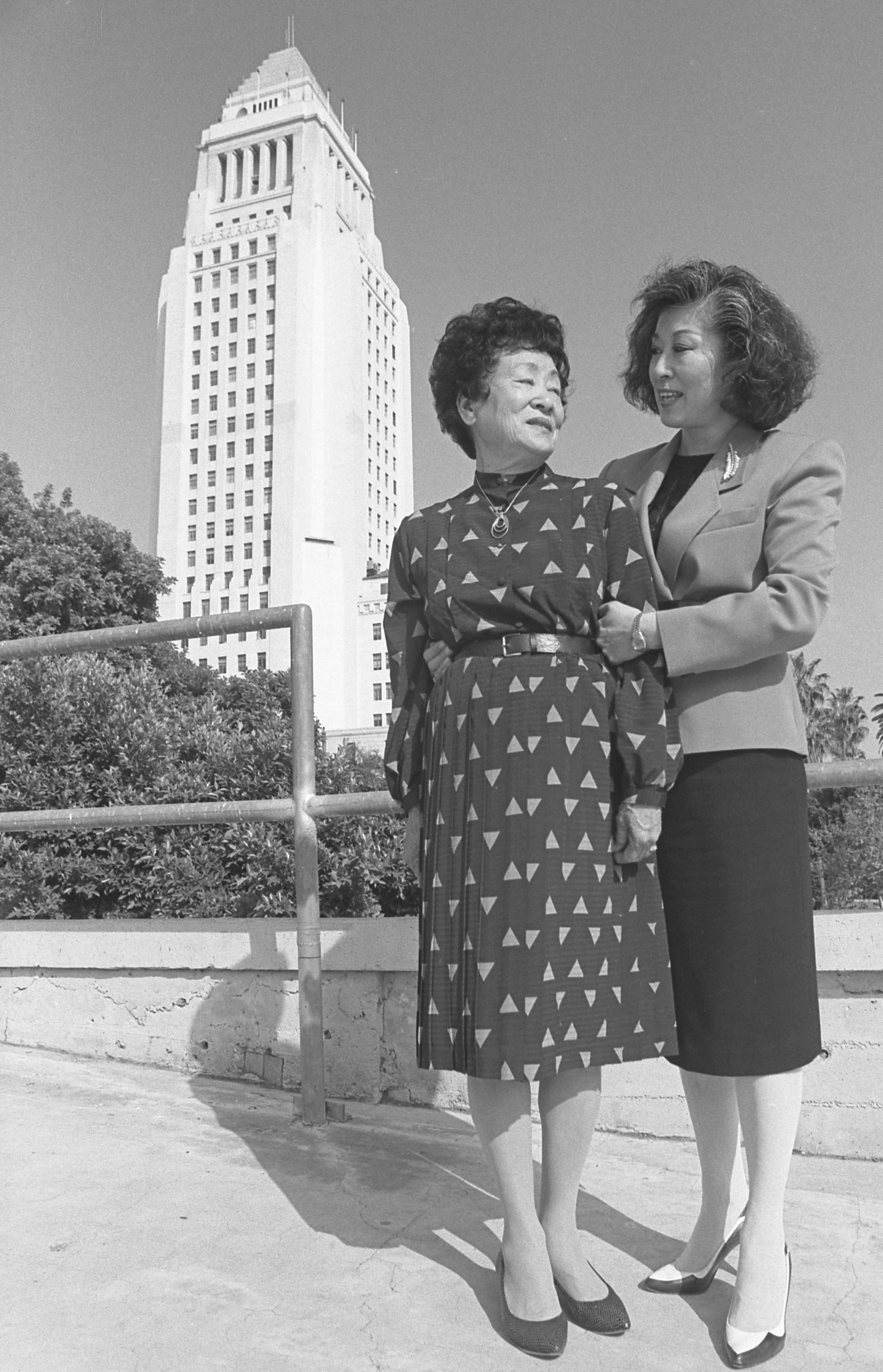
Ochi and her mother, Grace Matsui, near Los Angeles City Hall in 1986.

Ochi was born Takayo Matsui on December 15, 1938, in East Los Angeles, California, to Yoshiaki Roy and Mutsuko "Grace" Matsukawa Matsui, both who were from Kumamoto Prefecture, Japan. She was the third of four children and was born at the Japanese Hospital in East Los Angeles, unlike the many Nikkei babies that were born at home. When she was three, her family was sent to the Santa Anita Detention Center because of the U.S. involvement in World War II and the signing of Executive Order 9066. After six months, they were then sent to the Rohwer War Relocation Center, where she was given the English name "Rose".

After the end of the war, Ochi's parents faced deportation since they were on a business visa and fought the proceedings in San Francisco while Ochi and her siblings were left in Elko, Nevada. There, she experienced racism against her by the locals, but when her parents had the deportation orders overturned with the help of the ACLU, the family returned to East Los Angeles.

Ochi skipped two grades in Roosevelt High School and participated in UCLA's UniCamp to go to college there. In 1959, Ochi ran for Nisei Week Queen because her mother wanted to visit their relatives in Japan but didn't have enough money to do so, but the grand prize for pageant was a trip to Japan. In the same year, she graduated from UCLA with a bachelor's degree in physical education and worked at University High School and in the Montebello Unified School District before returning to East Los Angeles to teach at Stevenson Junior High School.

She was cast in the musical film Flower Drum Song but pulled out when she saw the costume she would wear. In 1963, she married Thomas Ochi.

== Law career and public service ==
Ochi decided to become a lawyer after seeing the East L.A. walkouts in the 1960s. She graduated from Loyola Law School in 1972 and was accepted into the State Bar of California in December. She turned down a job with the United States Attorney Office as a prosecutor and went to the USC to earn a Juris Doctor and became a Reginald Heber Smith Fellow for the Western Center on Law and Poverty. During that time, was co-counsel on an education reform case, Serrano v. Priest. She fought for Manzanar to become a National Historic Site.

Ochi joined Mayor Tom Bradley's administration and later Richard Riordan's administration as Director for Criminal Justice Planning. In 1979, she was selected to serve on President Jimmy Carter's Select Commission on Immigration and Refugee Policy and later worked for Bill Clinton on the National Drug Control Policy in 1997. After returning to Los Angeles in 2001, she was appointed to the Police Commission by Mayor James Hahn and became executive director of the California Forensic Science Institute at California State University, Los Angeles a year later.

== Death and legacy ==
After a second contacting of COVID-19, Ochi died on December 13, 2020, in Los Angeles after it further complicated her health problems. In a tribute post, Representative Judy Chu called her an inspiration to her. State Assembly member Chris Holden said that she was a "national treasure" while Assembly member Ed Chau said that he was saddened that they lost an "incredible community and civil rights leader." Developer Rick Caruso, who served with Ochi on the commission, said that she was a "true leader when it comes to police reform."

In 2021, the Los Angeles City Council voted unanimously to name an intersection at 1st and San Pedro in Downtown Los Angeles after her. The motion was introduced by Councilmember Kevin de León and a sign displaying the new name "Rose Ochi Square" was placed on the location. That same year, a plaque dedicated to Ochi was displayed at the LAPD Police Academy.
