= Eddie Imazu =

Art director

Edwin Yasuhei Imazu
- Born: 12 November 1897; Yamaguchi, Japan
- Died: 29 May 1979 (aged 81); Los Angeles, California, United States
- Other name: Eddie Imazu
- Occupation: Art director
- Years active: 1927–1967

Edwin Yasuhei Imazu (Japanese: 今津 安平, 12 November 1897 – 29 May 1979) was a Japanese-American art director and production designer, whose 50-year career in Hollywood included television and movie credits. A 1936 Academy Award co-nominee for best art direction on The Great Ziegfeld, Imazu worked with Hollywood actors including Spencer Tracy, John Wayne and Marlon Brando. He was born in Yamaguchi, Japan and died in Los Angeles.

== Early life ==
Imazu was born 12 November 1897 in Yamaguchi, Japan. As a teenager, he emigrated with his parents to Los Angeles. Employed as a houseboy while attending Hollywood High School, Imazu studied architecture and became the school's first Japanese graduate. Afterward, Imazu attended the University of California, Berkeley and majored in architecture.

During his sophomore year, Imazu vacationed in Los Angeles and attended a party hosted by Sessue Hayakawa, the famous Japanese actor. While circulating at the party, Imazu met a supervising art director at the old Metro studios. This art director offered Imazu a job—either being a cameraman or working in the art field. Because of his interest in architecture, Imazu chose the latter.

== Career ==
Imazu joined Metro studios as a draftsman in 1920. He remained at the studio until its merger with Goldwyn Pictures to form Metro-Goldwyn-Mayer (MGM) in 1924. In 1929, MGM promoted him from draftsman to art director.

During the early 1930s, Imazu met Aiko Kondo, a cousin of Mary Yuriko Kochiyama (née Nakahara), who became a prominent civil rights activist. Because she was beautiful, Aiko attracted many suitors, mostly naval officers whose ship had docked in San Pedro harbor. Aiko’s father didn’t trust these young sailors, so he asked a pre-teen Mary Nakahara to accompany Aiko on her dates.

Mary, later known as "Yuri," recalled feeling awkward about her third-wheel presence but felt relieved that Aiko never showed the slightest irritation. Yuri also recalled that Aiko Kondo was a portrait artist from an artistic family. When Yuri and her two brothers visited the Kondos, the siblings ran straight to the wastebaskets. They would rifle through the contents to retrieve discarded art, which they would take home.

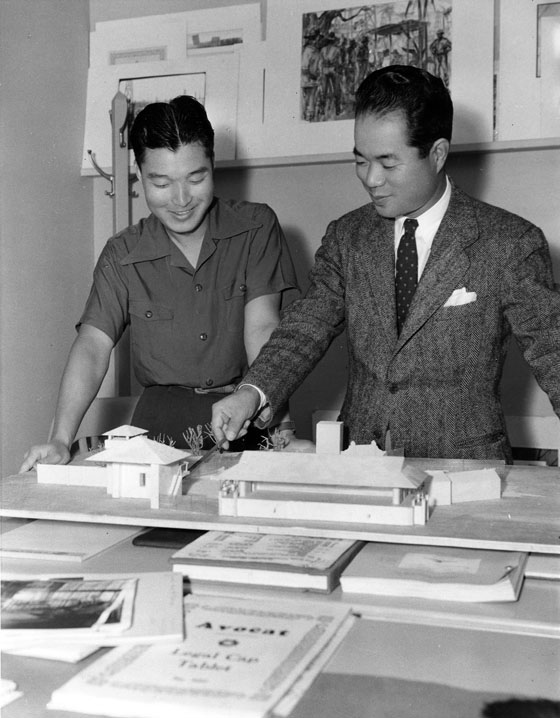
A young Eddie Imazu discussing set design with brother-in-law Takashi "Teek" Kondo

During the mid-1930s, Eddie Imazu married Aiko Kondo, creating a very happy, artistic union. In a 1947 interview with Pacific Citizen, Aiko Imazu said she preferred to make "rough sketches executed mostly in charcoal," whereas her husband created more complicated and detailed renderings. Aiko's brother Takashi "Teek" Kondo, an accomplished cartoonist, eventually became an MGM employee in the art department. Eddie and Aiko Imazu raised two daughters, Joyce and Darleen.

On 7 December 1941, Japan attacked Pearl Harbor and several weeks later, President Franklin Roosevelt issued Executive Order 9066. The EO 9066 required all Japanese Americans and Japanese immigrants to evacuate from the west coast to isolated, inland detention centers surrounded by barbed wire and guard towers. To retain Imazu as an art director, MGM offered him living accommodations inside the studio. But the government required Aiko Imazu and his daughters to report to the Santa Anita Assembly Center and later to the Jerome and Rohwer relocation camps, so Imazu chose to accompany his family into relocation.

After release from detention, Imazu returned home to Culver City in the Los Angeles area. The next day, Cedric Gibbons, supervising art director at MGM, wired Imazu to offer him his old job. Studio head, Louis B. Mayer, usually inaccessible to Hollywood VIPs, personally greeted Imazu back to work. Well-liked and respected by colleagues, Imazu worked at MGM Studios for 35 years.

During the 1950s, Imazu became a naturalized American citizen.

An inside-page interview of Imazu, at age 50, appeared in the edition of 20 December 1947 of Pacific Citizen, a Japanese-American newspaper. The headline reads, "Hollywood Story: A Portrait of Eddie Imazu, Art Director at MGM Studios." And the byline reads, By Alice Sumida. In the 24-inch profile, Imazu describes how he works.

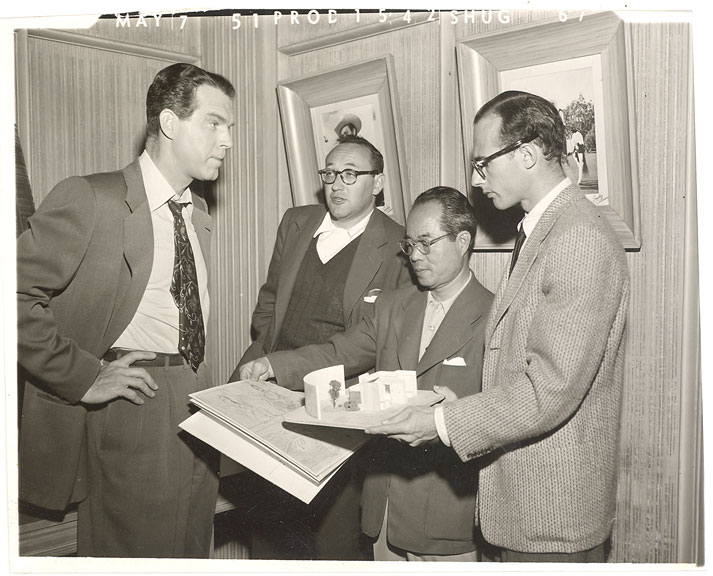
Eddie Imazu (second from right) discusses set designs with Fred MacMurray (far left) and MGM Studio executives.

First, he reads the script. If the movie must be shot on location, Imazu travels to an appropriate area and selects a site. For a studio movie, Imazu spends one or two months breaking the story into sets, estimating costs, making layouts, sketching and drawing models, and consulting the director. Imazu lines up the sets needed to ensure they're built in the proper order. He does a "roughing out," followed by a drafting.

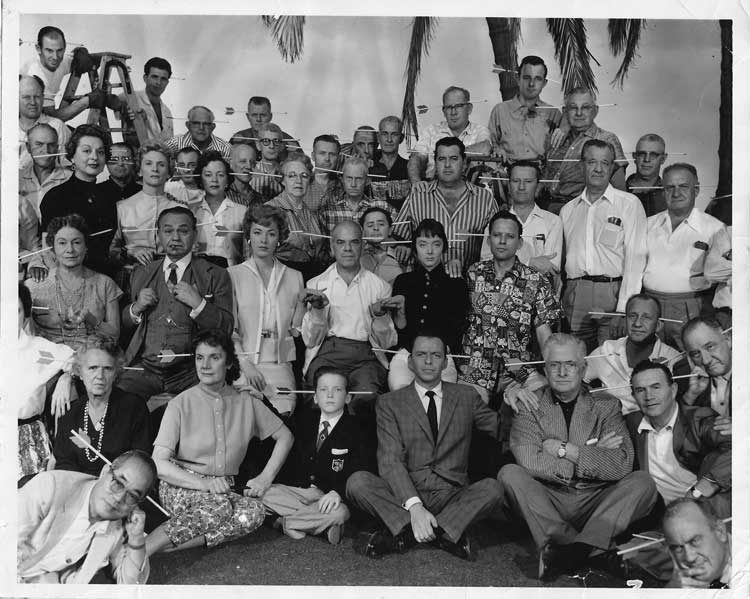
The set of A Hole in the Head, on location in Florida, Eddie Imazu, lower left, Frank Sinatra, bottom center

After the models are drawn, the director studies them and may suggest changes. If the proposed budget is suitable and the director is satisfied, the set plans go from the draftsman's workroom to the mill, where the units are made. After they're built, the sets are assembled on the stage and set up. Lastly, each set is painted, dressed and made ready to shoot. In Technicolor movies, the set's colors must beautifully offset the costumes, so wardrobe designers contribute ideas. Imazu's budget is 12% to 15% of the total production cost, usually about $250,000. A studio movie costs at the very least $1.5 million.

In 1936, Eddie Imazu was an Academy Award co-nominee for Best Art Direction on The Great Ziegfeld. Imazu's film credits include: McLintock! (1963); The Man Who Shot Liberty Valance (1962); The Teahouse of the August Moon (1956); Go For Broke! (1951); and Three Wise Fools (1946). His television credits include The Twilight Zone (1964); Combat! (1963-1964); and The Thin Man (1958).

== Death ==
After retiring from MGM in the late 1960s, Imazu fell into poor health. He died 29 May 1979 at age 81 in Los Angeles. Aiko Kondo Imazu died in April 1983.

== Selected filmography ==
- The Great Ziegfeld (1936)
- The Tall Target (1951)
