= George Hoshida =

George Yoshio Hoshida (1907, Japan-1985, Hawaii) was a Japanese American artist known for his drawings made during World War II, when he was incarcerated in three US internment camps and two Justice Department camps between 1942 and 1945. Nearly 300 of his works form the George Hoshida Collection, held and displayed by the Japanese American National Museum, founded in 1992 in Los Angeles, California.

Born in Japan, Hoshida had immigrated as a five-year-old child with his family to Hawai'i in 1912; it was then a territory of the United States. As Japanese nationals, the family were prohibited by United States law from ever becoming naturalized. Hoshida grew up to live and work in Hawai'i and married there. After the Pearl Harbor attack in 1941, the United States feared that Japanese in the islands might aid Japan, and interned many. They eventually transferred Hoshida and others to internment centers on the mainland of the United States. He was not reunited with his family until 1944, when they were all transferred to the Jerome War Relocation Center in the Arkansas Delta west of the Mississippi River. They were transferred to another center before being released in 1945, after which they returned to Hawai'i. It was not until passage of the Walter-McCarran Act in 1952 that Japanese Americans born in Japan were allowed to become naturalized US citizens.

== Early years ==
Hoshida was born in Kumamoto, Japan in 1907. He and his family emigrated to Hilo, Territory of Hawaii in 1912. After his graduation from junior high school, Hoshida started to work at Hilo Electric Company. He was an active Buddhist who served at a Buddhist temple.

Hoshida also became president of a Hawaii Island Judo Federation. He married and had a family.

== Incarceration ==
After the 1941 Pearl Harbor attack, many Japanese Americans were interned in camps. Japanese nationals, such as Hoshida, were picked up on fear of divided loyalties and initially held in Kilauea Military Camp on Hawaii in 1942. During this period he drew his first known picture of this period, Kilauea Military Detention Camp. Hoshida taught other internees the art of drawing.

In 1942 Hoshida was sent to a Justice Department Camp at Lordsburg, New Mexico, where he drew Lordsburg I.C. North-East View, My Bed at Ft. Sam Houston, and Amateur.

In 1942 Hoshida was sent to another Justice Department Camp in Santa Fe, New Mexico. Between 1942 and 1943 he drew Funeral Service, Softball Game and Looking Towards.

In 1943 Hoshida was sent to Jerome War Relocation Center in the Arkansas Delta west of the Mississippi River. In 1944 his wife and two children were also transferred to this camp, reuniting the family for the first time in years. In January 1944 Hoshida drew A Corner of Our Apartment and Mama's Daily War Clothes.

In June 1944 the Jerome Center was closed. Hoshida and his family were transferred to Gila River War Relocation Center, based on the Gila River Indian Reservation. At the peak nearly 14,000 persons were interned at this center and it was one of the last to be closed. There he drew Looking at Center Picnic and another untitled picture.

== Release ==
In late 1945 the internment camps were closed, and Hoshida was released and returned to Hawaii with his family.

== Death ==
Hoshida died in 1985. His family donated 263 of his works to the Japanese American National Museum that had been founded in Los Angeles, California, for public display. They kept works on display at the museum in Little Tokyo, Los Angeles.
