= Taitetsu Unno =

Reverend Taitetsu Unno
- Title: Reverend; Doctor

Personal life
- Born: February 5, 1929 Japan
- Died: December 13, 2014 (aged 85)
- Spouse: Alice
- Children: Mark T. Unno
- Education: University of California, Berkeley; Tokyo University

Religious life
- Religion: Shin Buddhism

Senior posting
- Teacher: Masao Hanada, Yoshifumi Ueda
- Based in: Northampton, Massachusetts

Taitetsu Unno (海野 大徹 Unno Taitetsu) was a scholar, lecturer, and author on the subject of Pure Land Buddhism. His work as a translator has been responsible for making many important Buddhist texts available to the English-speaking world and he is considered one of the leading authorities in the United States on Shin Buddhism, a branch of Pure Land Buddhism. Dr. Unno was an ordained Shin Buddhist minister and the founding Sensei of the Northampton Shin Buddhist Sangha in Massachusetts.

He published extensively on the subject of Pure Land Buddhism, his most famous works include: Shin Buddhism: Bits of Rubble Turn Into Gold, River of Fire, River of Water, and Tannisho: A Shin Buddhist Classic.

== Biography ==
Born in Japan in 1929, Taitetsu Unno immigrated to the United States at the age of six. During World War II, following the enforcement of Executive Order 9066, he spent three and a half years imprisoned in the Rohwer internment camp in Arkansas, and Tule Lake in California. He graduated from the University of California, Berkeley with a degree in English literature and received M.A. and Ph.D. degrees in Buddhist Studies from Tokyo University.

From 1971 to 1998 he taught Buddhism and Japanese aesthetics and was the Jill Ker Conway Professor Emeritus of Religion at Smith College. He retired in December 1998. After his retirement, he continued to travel as a lecturer on Japanese Buddhism, religion, and culture.

Unno died on December 13, 2014.

== Essays ==
- Unno, Taitetsu. "Is There a God? A Buddhist Answer". Skeptic Tank. Archived from the original on 2019-09-13.
- Unno, Taitetsu (1999). "Contrasting Images of the Buddha". Buddhist-Christian Studies. 19 (1): 133–136. doi:10.1353/bcs.1999.0037.

== Bibliography ==
- Buddhism of the Heart: Reflections on Shin Buddhism and Inner Togetherness [foreword] (Wisdom Publications, 2009) ISBN 978-0-86171-583-1
- Coffinman: The Journal of a Buddhist Mortician [foreword] (Buddhist Education Center, 2004) ISBN 978-0-9721395-0-2
- The Global Myths: Exploring Primitive, Pagan, Sacred, and Scientific Mythologies [preface] (Plume, 1994) ISBN 978-0-452-01116-8
- Living in Amida's Universal Vow: Essays in Shin Buddhism [contributor] (World Wisdom, 2004) ISBN 978-0-941532-54-9
- Mahayana Buddhism: An approach to its essence (Pure Land Publications, 1989) ISBN 978-1-877604-03-4
- Notes on "Essentials of Faith Alone": A Translation of Shinran's Yuishinsho-mon'i[translator] (Hongwanji International Center, 1979) ISBN 978-4-938490-02-7
- Praying With Our Hands: 21 Practices of Embodied Prayer from the World's Spiritual Traditions [afterword] (Skylight Paths Publishing, 2000) ISBN 978-1-893361-16-4
- River of Fire, River of Water (Image, 1998) ISBN 978-0-385-48511-1
- [with James W. Heisig (editors)], The Religious Philosophy of Tanabe Hajime: The Metanoetic Imperative(Nanzan Studies in Religion and Culture), Asian Humanities Press (June 1990), ISBN 0-89581-873-6, ISBN 978-0-89581-873-7.
- Sermons of a Buddhist Abbot: A Classic of American Buddhism [introduction] (Three Leaves, 2004) ISBN 978-0-385-51048-6
- Shin Buddhism: Bits of Rubble Turn into Gold (Image, 2002) ISBN 978-0-385-50469-0
- Shin Buddhism: Monograph Series (Pureland Publications, 1993) ISBN 1-877604-07-0
- The Spirit of Aikido [translator] (Kodansha America, 1984) ISBN 978-0-87011-600-1
- Tannisho: A Shin Buddhist Classic [translator] (Buddhist Study Center Press, 1996)ISBN 978-0938474180
