= Theodore Kanamine =

American general officer

Theodore S. Kanamine
- Born: August 29, 1929; Hollywood, California, U.S.
- Died: March 2, 2023 (aged 93); Naples, Florida, U.S.
- Burial place: Sarasota Veterans National Cemetery
- Military career
- Allegiance: United States
- Branch: United States Army
- Service years: 1955–1981
- Rank: Brigadier General
- Unit: Army Criminal Investigation Division Military Assistance Command, Vietnam
- Commands: 716th Military Police Battalion
- Conflicts: Vietnam War
- Awards: Distinguished Service Medal; Bronze Star Medal; Legion of Merit (2); Meritorious Service Medal (2)

Theodore Shigeru Kanamine (August 29, 1929 – March 2, 2023) was an American military officer, a United States Army brigadier general, and the first Japanese-American active duty general in the United States armed forces. Serving in the military police, he led the investigation of the My Lai massacre in 1968, a massacre in which hundreds of unarmed people were killed.

Born in California, Kanamine and his family were sent to an internment camp when he was 12-years-old.

== Early life ==
On August 29, 1929, Kanamine was born in Hollywood, California. His parents were Japanese-American immigrants and he had a younger sister. In 1942, at age 12, Kanamine and his family were incarcerated in an internment camp in Jerome, Arkansas following the signing of Executive Order 9066. After their release, the family moved to Nebraska. He attended the University of Nebraska, where he studied criminal psychology. He later enrolled in the university's College of Law, graduating in 1954. Following his graduation, he realized that he did not want to be an attorney and later joined the U.S. military. That year, he married Mary Stuben, a fellow graduate. Due to Nebraska state laws restricting interracial marriages, the couple wed in Council Bluffs, Iowa.

== Career ==
After commissioning as a second lieutenant through the Reserve Officer Training Corps, Kanamine joined active service with a military police unit in 1955. He would later serve with Military Assistance Command, Vietnam in Saigon and participated in the Tet Offensive. He led the investigation of the My Lai massacre; the 1968 incident saw soldiers from the 23rd Infantry Division kill hundreds of unarmed people. During his career, Kanamine served as an aide to General Creighton Abrams, who recommended his promotion to brigadier general. In 1979, while in the capacity of provost marshal of United States Army, Europe and Seventh United States Army, he oversaw efforts to combat drug abuse amongst American armed forces in Germany. After returning to the States and serving as chief of staff of the First Army, he retired in 1981.

== Death ==
On March 2, 2023, Kanamine died in Naples, Florida. He was remembered by the Washington Post as an individual, "who grew up in a World War II internment camp and later became the U.S. Army’s first Japanese-American active duty general." He is survived by his wife, Mary; their five children Ted and his wife Sara; Mike; David; Laura and her husband Howard Rutizer; and Linda; a nephew Gregg Tamai and his wife Susie; a niece Katie Takahama; 12 grandchildren and 12 great-grandchildren.
