= The Church of Jesus Christ of Latter-day Saints in Japan =

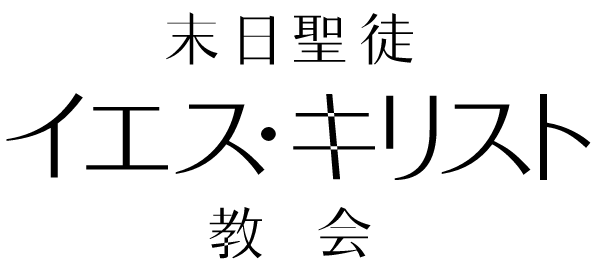
- Church logo in Japanese

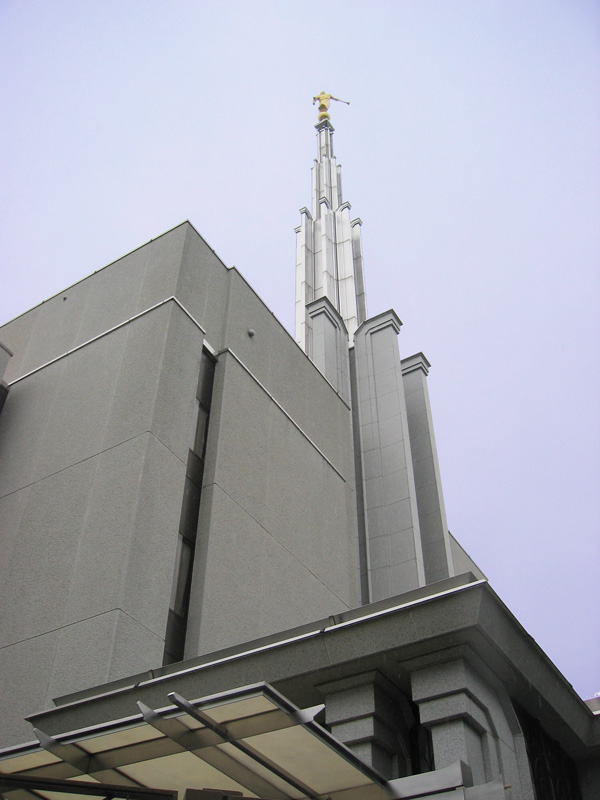
- The Tokyo Japan Temple
- Area: Asia North
- Members: 131,776 (2025)
- Stakes: 22
- Districts: 9
- Wards: 142
- Branches: 88
- Total congregations: 230
- Missions: 7
- Temples: 4 operating; 1 announced; 5 total
- FamilySearch Centers: 56

The Church of Jesus Christ of Latter-day Saints (LDS Church) (Japanese: 末日聖徒イエス・キリスト教会, Hepburn: Matsujitsuseito Iesu-Kirisuto Kyōkai) was established in Japan in 1901 when the church's first missionaries arrived on August 12. Among them was Heber J. Grant, who was then a member of the Quorum of the Twelve and later became the church's 7th president. Horace S. Ensign, Louis A. Kelsch, and Alma O. Taylor accompanied Grant. The LDS Church's first baptism in Japan was on March 8, 1902, when Grant baptized Hajime Nakazawa, a former Kannushi (Shinto priest). The Book of Mormon was translated three times. The first translation, which took over six years, was completed by Taylor in 1909. It was then recommended that the Book of Mormon be translated into bunshō, a more elegant literary style, which was done by Chōkō Ikuta in 1909, shortly before it was published and distributed. The third translation in 1957 was done by Tatsui Sato. In 1995, the Book of Mormon was translated again into a more colloquial style.

Missionary work from the opening of the Japan Mission through 1924 was challenging due to language barriers and cultural differences, as well as the 1923 Tokyo earthquake and the Immigration Act of 1924. Few baptisms were performed during this time period. Due to these difficulties, the Japan Mission was closed from 1924 to 1945, until after the end of World War II. During the twenty years missionary work was halted in Japan, the work was moved to Hawaii to reach Japanese people living there. A small number of Latter-day Saints in Japan met together privately in their homes from 1924 to 1945, under the leadership of Fujiya Nara and later Fujiwara Takeo.

The mission was reopened in 1948 with Edward L. Clissold as president. Missionary work flourished after 1948 with the number of baptisms increasing, requiring new missions to be opened. The LDS Church decided to open the Mormon Pavilion during the Expo '70 in Osaka. After the Expo, baptisms doubled from 1969 to 1970. Two days after the Expo finished, the church's first stake in Japan was established in Tokyo in 1970. The Tokyo Japan Temple, the first temple in Japan and in Asia, was dedicated in 1980.

As of 2025, the LDS Church reported 131,776 members in 230 congregations in Japan, making it the second largest body of LDS Church members in Asia behind the Philippines.

== History ==
Membership in Japan
Year	Members
1940	60
1950	211
1960	2,502
1970	11,868
1980	17,947
1989*	91,000
1999	110,987
2009	123,225
2019	130,340
2025	131,776
*Membership was published as an estimated or rounded number. Source: Wendell J. Ashton; Jim M. Wall, Deseret News, various years, Church Almanac Country Information: Japan

=== 1901–1924: Establishment of the Japan Mission ===
==== Missionary efforts ====
Walter M. Gibson, sent by Brigham Young, attempted to send missionaries to the Pacific in 1861, but stopped his mission in Hawaii. He wrote a book of strict instructions for a morally and physically clean life that the Hawaiian people should follow, called the "Sanitary Instructions". He was excommunicated from the church in 1864 for selling church offices to islanders and using the money to buy large amounts of land on Lanai. In 1895, the Japanese Consul in San Francisco asked Abraham H. Cannon if there were plans to open up a mission in Japan. However, he died before the mission could be established. Then in 1901, the church's First Presidency announced the opening of the Japan Mission.

Heber J. Grant, of the Quorum of the Twelve Apostles and later the church's seventh president, was assigned to establish the first LDS Church mission in Asia, headquartered in Tokyo. The Panic of 1893 caused him to go into a lot of debt, so at the time, he was in serious financial distress. The First Presidency allowed him one year to get out of debt, which he did in the allotted time.

Grant handpicked the first three missionaries to serve with him in Japan: Horace S. Ensign, Louis A. Kelsch, and Alma O. Taylor. They became known as the "Japanese Quartet". They arrived in Japan on August 12, 1901. Despite their arrival, the missionaries did not yet have permission from the government to proselyte, so they spent their time learning the language. After lobbying with the chief of police, the missionaries received permission to preach in early October. The missionaries, particularly Grant, had great difficulties learning the language. The missionaries met Takahashi Gorō, who had previously published a defense of the Mormons in the periodical The Sun. Takahashi spoke good English and had a knowledge of other languages. He decided to help Grant by writing a book that would introduce the mission of the Latter-day Saints to the Japanese people. Nakazawa Hajime became the first baptized member in Japan. Nakazawa soon began asking Grant for money to start a new business, and because the LDS Church is prohibited from loaning members money to start businesses, Grant refused. Nakazawa was caught robbing the mission house and was excommunicated from the church and arrested. After the arrest of Nakazawa, Takahashi no longer supported the missionaries, describing Grant as cruel and "cold-blooded" for refusing to pay Nakazawa.

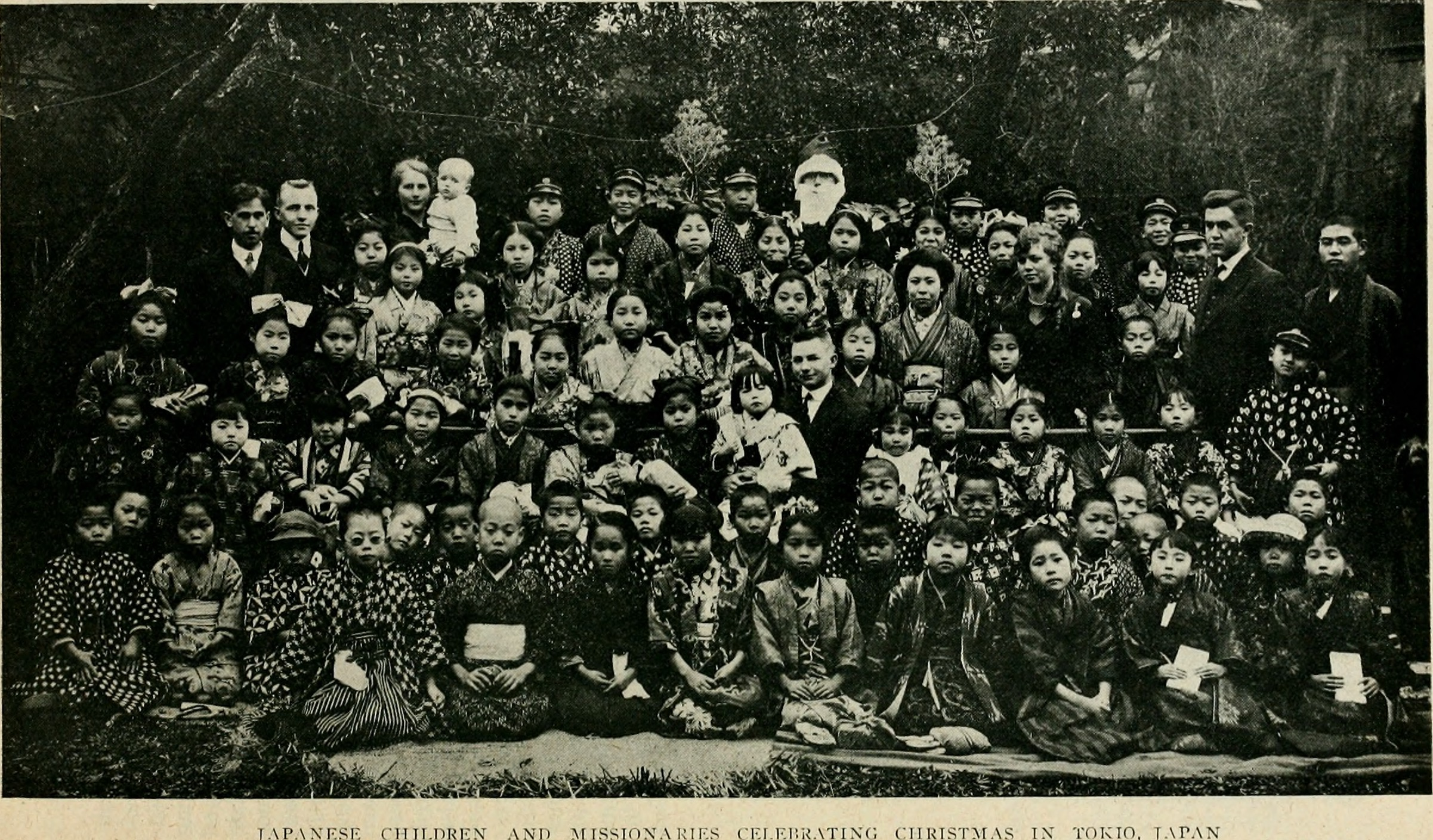
Japanese Children and Missionaries Celebrating Christmas in Tokyo, Japan (1917)

From 1902 to 1924, eighty-eight missionaries proselyted in twenty-nine locations, laboring largely in Tokyo, Sapporo, and Osaka, performing 166 baptisms. However, on August 7, 1924, Grant, then president of the church, closed the mission to await a more favorable time, due to the low number of baptisms.

Several issues contributed to the low number of baptisms. Ongoing problems in the mission included the difficulty of the language, as well as cultural differences. Also, the small number of missionaries and their extended service caused fatigue among them and hardships for their loved ones. There were also external problems: the earthquake in Tokyo in 1923 stalled proselytizing, the United States' Immigration Act of 1924 caused racial tensions between Japan and the United States. Finally, the general sense of defeatism of the missionaries in Japan and Church leaders in Salt Lake City influenced the decision to close the mission in Japan. Even though they did not baptize many members, they translated the Book of Mormon into Japanese. They also wrote a Japanese hymnbook, a history of the Church, a biography of Joseph Smith, and other literature. Missionaries, as well as the Church in general, gained experience that would make the reestablishment of the mission in 1948 more successful.

==== First Japanese church members ====
The first baptized Japanese member was Hajime Nakazawa, a former Shinto priest. He was baptized on March 8, 1902, on the shore of Omori in Tokyo Bay. Although he was the first baptized member, he was not the first active member of the LDS Church. After he was baptized, he and his wife asked the missionaries for a significant amount of money. The missionaries refused and he was later caught attempting to rob the missionaries' home. He was then excommunicated and subsequently arrested.

One of the most prominent first Japanese church members was Tomizo Katsunuma, a veterinarian and immigration inspector in Honolulu, honored as the "Father of Immigrants". He is notable as one of the first members of LDS Church with Japanese ancestry. He moved to the United States during the emigration fever. He had many contacts with LDS Church members in Logan, Utah, which influenced his decision to get baptized on August 8, 1895. After his death, the headline of the obituary read "Dr. Katsunuma, first Japanese Mormon, dies".

Tokujiro Sato was another one of the church's first Japanese converts. Tokujiro immigrated to Hawaii from Japan. Tukujiro supposedly joined the church in 1892, though because of the lack of records, it is unclear when he was baptized or whether he was baptized at all. He was listed in membership records in the Waipio Branch, but there is no baptism record. However, the baptisms of his children were recorded and, despite the lack of records, Taokujiro attended the LDS Church throughout his life.

==== Portrayal of the church in Japan ====
Other Christian churches often preached against the LDS Church, criticizing its doctrines, yet admitting the strange propensity it seemed to have in attracting followers. The doctrine of the church, and polygamy in particular, was seen as a threat to Japanese culture and the Meiji society's ideals of civilization. Even though the Japanese people heard about the church through the Iwakura Mission to the United States in 1872, the earliest official printed introduction of the Japanese people to the LDS Church was likely the 1879 Japanese translation of Jules Verne's Around the World in 80 Days. Jean Passepartout, a character in the book, heard a lecture on Mormonism and polygamy which disturbed him. Magazine articles helped to spread the knowledge of the church in Japan, however, the articles focused on polygamy and its dangers to women and society in an increasingly Westernizing country. Some Japanese saw the polygamous practices of Latter-day Saints as a direct offense to the attempts to eliminate laws and traditions surrounding concubines. When the church missionaries taught about church's doctrine to the Japanese, it was often necessary to counter the assumptions the Japanese people had about the church and polygamy. The Japanese translation of the book A Brief History of the Church of Jesus Christ of Latter-day Saints included an extra chapter on polygamy in order to provide some clarification that the LDS Church no longer practiced it.

==== Translation of the Book of Mormon ====
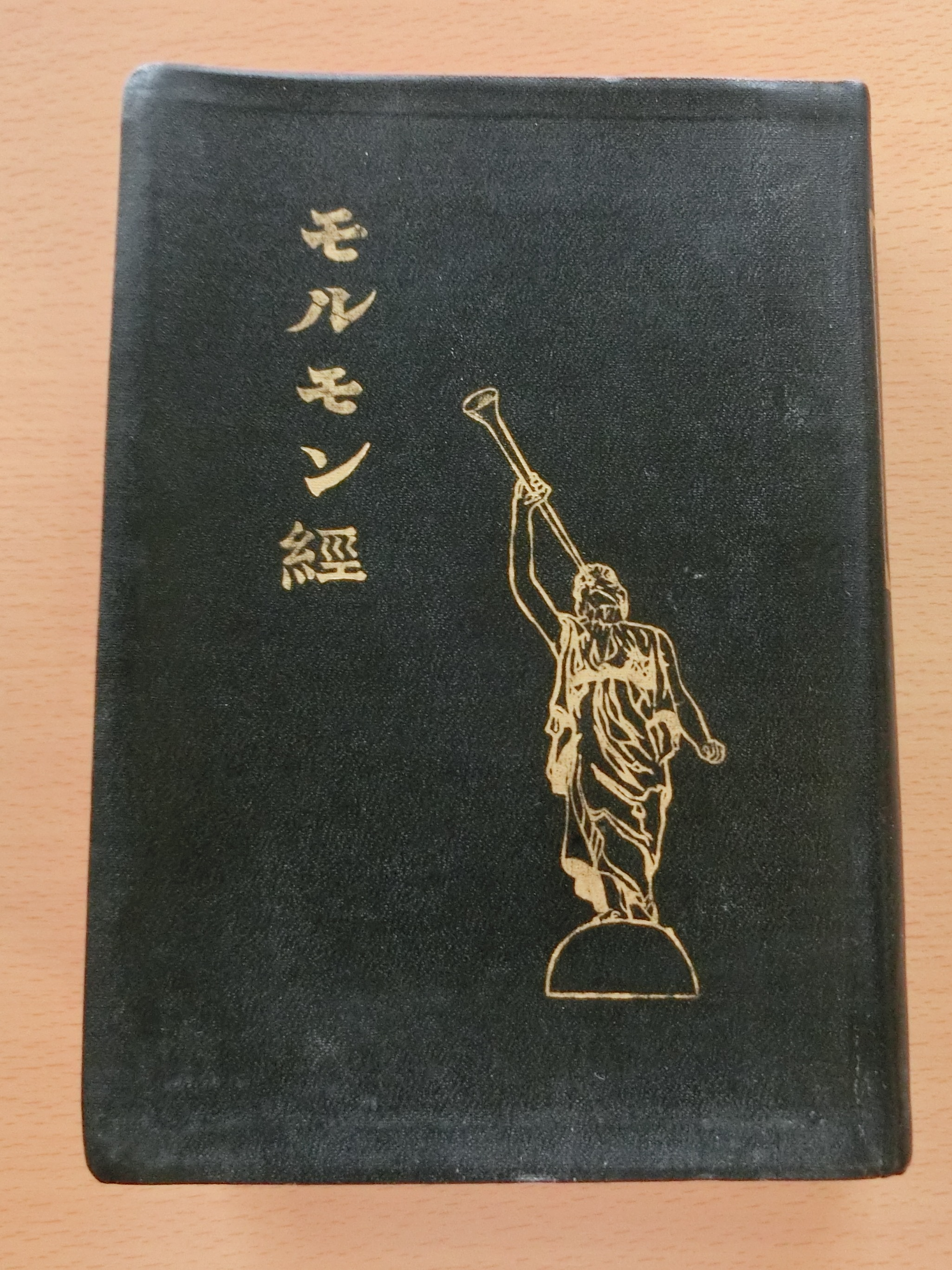
The Book of Mormon in Japanese

The translation of the Book of Mormon began in 1904 and went through 1909, taking almost six years. The elders had no working knowledge of Japanese and the reputation of the LDS Church made it difficult for them to find native speakers who were willing to help them with the language. Mission president Horace S. Ensign requested that each missionary use his spare time translating the Book of Mormon into Japanese. Seven months later, the compiled translation was assigned to Alma O. Taylor who worked full-time to complete it. Taylor finished the translation in 1906, after working 21 months. The next 18 months were used to edit, re-read, and correct the Book of Mormon.

Noguchi Zenshirō, a delegate to the World's Parliament of Religions, and Susuzki Genta recommended to Taylor that the style of the Book of Mormon should be changed from the colloquial genbun'itchi style to bunshō, a more elegant written style historically used in literature, records, and official documents. Chōkō Ikuta changed the style of the translation to bunshō and finished in May 1909. Final corrections were made July 24, 1909. The first five thousand copies were released October 11, 1909, with special editions made for monarchs and government leaders. The task of translating the Book of Mormon into Japanese was taken with great care. Taylor read his translations about fourteen times, while critics read the translation seven times. They recruited help from some of the best Japanese authors of the time such as Tsubouchi Shōyō and Hōmei Iwano.

A second translation of the Book of Mormon was published in 1957. The translation was made by Tatsui Sato, who belonged to the first baptized Japanese family after the closure of the mission in 1924. The most recent translation of the Book of Mormon was published in 1995 in a colloquial style. This style became more widely used after World War II.

=== 1924–1945: Closed Japan Mission ===
From 1924 to 1945, the LDS Church withdrew its missionaries, leadership, and organizational structure, leaving the Japanese Latter-day Saints on their own. Losing contact with the main body of the church created a challenge for the remaining members, with no one to lead their congregation. Because of the lack of church leadership in Japan, the LDS Church in Japan was maintained by a man named Fujiya Nara. Born May 10, 1898, in Japan, he started attending Sunday School in the Sapporo Branch at age thirteen. He was baptized four years later on July 6, 1915, in the Tama River in Tokyo by Joseph H. Stimpson, the Japan Mission president at the time. In 1923, he became the first native Japanese to be ordained an elder. On April 6, 1924, his own wedding to Motoko Yoshimizu was to be the first and last LDS marriage performed in Japan for some time, as the Japan Mission closed down a few months later. In 1927, Fujiya Nara was appointed presiding elder, similar to a branch president who leads a small group of church members, by the First Presidency over the small group of Japanese members (137) that remained and restored some priesthood activities. Nara published a newsletter, "Shuro" (Palm) and held meetings with the remaining members. After the release of Nara, Fujiwara Takeo was set apart as presiding elder. Fujiwara was born in 1905 and was baptized on May 10, 1924, right before the close of the Japan Mission. He was invited to study at Brigham Young University (BYU), where he earned a Master's degree in history. He spent seven years in Utah, where LDS Church leaders prepared him to become presiding elder.

Fujiwara focused his work in the church in Japan on reactivation of baptized members. In the mid-1930s, with World War II imminent, Heber J. Grant decided to pursue efforts to work among the Japanese in Hawaii. On February 24, 1937, the Japanese-Central Pacific Mission, a mission primarily aimed at teaching Japanese people in Hawaii, was opened and headquartered in Honolulu, Hawaii, with Hilton A. Robertson as president. Following World War II, the period from 1945 to 1951, or the Occupation of Japan by the Allied Forces has been called the "Christian boom". With newly declared religious freedom and tough post-war conditions, the Japanese people were more interested in Christianity than they had been for a long time.

=== 1948–1965: Reestablishment of the Japan Mission ===
It was not until March 6, 1948, that Edward L. Clissold was given permission to return to Japan, leading the missionary work as the mission president. Clissold had been part of the United States military occupation forces in Japan after World War II. His new task was to find what remained of the Latter-day Saints from twenty-four years before. He put a small advertisement in Japanese (with a translation error) in the newspaper, "URGENT NOTICE—I would like any member of the Church of Jesus Christ of Near-Day [sic] Saints (Mormon Church) to contact me as soon as possible. Daiichi Hotel, Room 548. Lt. Col. Edward Clissold." Nara Fujiya noticed the advertisement, responded, and some Japanese Saints were located and started to take part in Clissold and other servicemen's church activities. From 1943 to 1944, Clissold had been acting president of the Central Pacific Mission, a mission in Hawaii that was primarily aimed at teaching Japanese people. His next task was to establish a mission headquarters. He obtained a partially burned mansion which had belonged to the Japanese Minister of Welfare during the war. After renovation of the mission home, the first five missionaries arrived in Japan on June 26, 1948. Harrison Theodore "Ted" Price, became the first missionary in 1947. Other missionaries included a Japanese born abroad, Kooji Okauchi (nisei) and two American soldiers who had fought the Japanese in the Pacific Theater just years prior.

After Clissold's eighteen-month long presidency, Vinal G. Mauss succeeded him and served from 1949 to 1953. Membership in the church in Japan increased from 211 to more than 800, with the number of districts increasing from one to five, the number of branches grew to twenty-five, and the number of missionaries increased to eighty-four. 184 people were baptized in 1950, more than had joined the church in the twenty years that it had been open in the early 1900s. Hilton A. Robertson replaced Mauss as mission president. Robertson was one of the missionaries in the early Japan mission, and had presided over the Japanese-Central Pacific Mission from 1937 to 1940. When Robertson was set apart as president of the Japan Mission, he was told he would also be in charge of presiding over the Chinese Mission. He supported Tatsui Sato in re-translating the Book of Mormon as well as translating the Mormon works Doctrine and Covenants and the Pearl of Great Price. He bought more land for the church to use as chapels and living quarters for missionaries. He strengthened auxiliary organizations such as the Young Men and Young Women programs (collectively known as the Mutual Improvement Association), Sunday School, and Relief Society. On July 28, 1955, the Japan Mission was split into the Northern and the Southern Far East Mission. This split created the largest transfer within a mission boundary in the world from Naha, Okinawa, to Asahigawa, Hokkaidō.

Paul C. Andrus became the next mission president, serving from 1955 to 1962. Membership grew from 1,000 to more than 6,600. The church grew rapidly in Korea, so a separate Korean mission was made, as it had previously been included in the Japan Mission. The number of missionaries grew from 82 to 179. After inventing a new proselytizing plan based on teaching the Bible, bearing testimony, and inviting the investigator to be baptized, baptisms grew from 129 in 1956 to 616 in 1957. Andrus was also instrumental in preparing Japan and Korea for stakes by advancing the priesthood of the members. He also worked to make other church material like auxiliary manuals and handbooks available in Japanese. The number of branches grew from 26 to 37. One of the most profitable purchases of the church at the time was the purchase of a Yoyogi Street property in Omote Sando, Tokyo, serving as the Central Branch meetinghouse. Eventually, the church sold the building in 1973 for $24,150,943, having originally spent less than $150,000 for it.

Having served as a missionary under Mauss, Dwayne N. Andersen became the new mission president in 1962. At the time, there was 7,000 church members in Japan, with the number of missionaries exceeding 180. Andersen made large strides in constructing new church buildings and remodeling older ones. The number of priesthood holders increased significantly. Fundraising was done for members to travel to the Hawaii Temple to receive temple ordinances. On April 26, 1964, the first meetinghouse in Asia, the Tokyo North Branch, was dedicated by Gordon B. Hinckley, then a member of the Quorum of the Twelve Apostles. In July 1965, 164 Japanese Latter-day Saints traveled to Hawaii to attend the temple. Trips such as these occurred almost yearly until the Tokyo Temple was built in 1980. In 1965, Andersen was succeeded by Adney Y. Komatsu.

==== Relief Society ====
For much of the early history of the LDS Church in Japan, few church meetings were held. The charity organization called Relief Society began in the early 1950s. In a normal Latter-day Saint church meeting, the Relief Society meetings serves as one hour of the three hour block, where women meet together and are taught lessons about various topics concerning Jesus Christ by another member of the Relief Society who is assigned to teach. Unable to organize an official Relief Society, women would often meet together in sister missionaries' apartments and learn to cook. The women would deliver welfare supplies from the Relief Society in the United States to families with children in Sunday School. In Japan, the members of the Relief Society held bazaars selling cheap goods for low prices to raise money in postwar Japan. The Relief Society worked to help repair missionary clothing and wash missionaries' bedding. Eventually, branches formed small, official groups of the Relief Society; however, auxiliary manuals had not yet been translated into Japanese, so Relief Society materials came from sister missionaries. From 1965 to 1966, materials for Christian instruction came in Seito-No-Michi (a worldwide church magazine), but sometimes no lessons were featured, as only issues October through May contained lesson plans. During the months when the Relief Society didn't have lessons, they had "work meetings", creating their own manual to be approved by the Relief Society General Board.

=== 1968–1980: Church expansion ===
On September 1, 1968, Walter Bills was named the new mission president of the Northern Far-East Mission, renamed the Japan Mission. The Southern Far-East Mission was named the Japan-Okinawa Mission and was presided over by Edward Okazaki. Due to the Japan Mission being headquartered in Tokyo, it grew much more quickly than the Japan-Okinawa Mission. Bills opened three new branches and nine cities for proselytizing and instituted the Book of Mormon placement program, stating that the Book of Mormon would lead to conversion. In 1969, Japanese missionaries carried more copies of the Book of Mormon, distributing over 208,000 books. Bills attributed at least 60% of the baptisms during his presidency to the program. Bills also focused on training people to run stakes, the administrative units of the LDS Church. In this way, he was preparing for a stake in Tokyo. All auxiliaries were established in Japan at this time, including the Primary, the children's organization. Okazaki was the second mission president of Japanese ancestry. At the end of Bill's service in 1971, baptisms were up to one baptism per missionary per month, which was about 200 baptisms total.

In 1969, a language-training center for Japanese and other Asian and African languages was established at BYU-Hawaii. Future missionaries assigned to Japan were sent to Hawaii for two months where they learned the language, as well as working to learn about the Japanese people, food and culture. Within the same week, the church opened a display at Expo '70 in Osaka, featuring a new version of the LDS film Man's Search for Happiness created specially for this event. BYU's Young Ambassadors also performed at the Expo. The church received a lot of attention due to the World Fair. The LDS Church was the only Christian denomination to have its own pavilion at the fair. Ten percent (6,658,532) of the guests who attended the Expo visited the Mormon Pavilion, which was a temporary display that introduced the people of Japan to the LDS Church. Fifty thousand copies of the Book of Mormon were distributed and there were 779 baptisms in Japan in 1970, double that of 1969. The Tokyo Stake was the church's first in Asia. It was organized on March 15, 1970, two days after the Expo. Tanaka Kenji became the first president of the Tokyo Stake.

The Japanese missions were changed again and split into four missions. The Japan Mission became the Japan East Mission and the Japan-Okinawa Mission. The Japan-Okinawa Mission became the Japan Central Mission and the Japan West Mission. Two new mission presidents were introduced, while Bills and Okazaki retained their positions over their respective missions. Russell Horiuchi, a professor at BYU, became president of the Japan East Mission. Watanabe Kan became president of the Japan West Mission and became the first native Japanese mission president. In 1965, Adney Y. Komatsu became mission president, the first of Japanese ancestry, and in 1975, during the first area conference in Japan, he became the first general authority of Japanese ancestry. Yoshihiko Kikuchi became the first native Japanese general authority in 1977. In 1979, the Japanese Missionary Training Center (JMTC) was created. The JMTC closed in 2009. The first LDS temple in Asia was the Tokyo Temple, which was dedicated on October 27, 1980, by Spencer W. Kimball.

=== 1980–present: recent developments ===
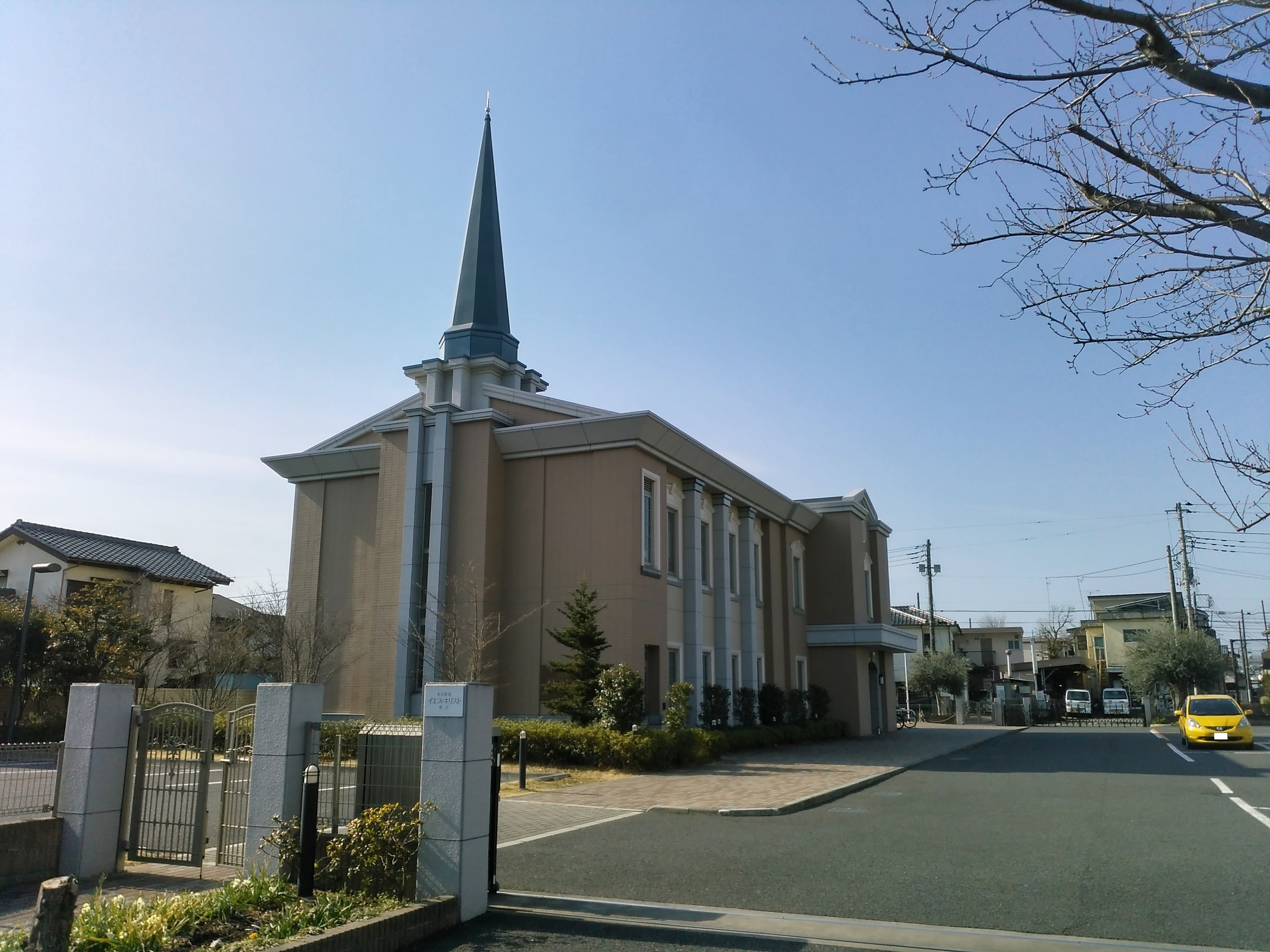
A meetinghouse in Okegawa, Saitama, Japan

The Mormon Tabernacle Choir traveled to Japan for its second tour in 1985. Tsuneo Ishikawa, president of the Chukyo Television Broadcasting Company, hosted an extravagant reception for the choir in Nagoya. The LDS Church provided extensive humanitarian services and resources to Japan after the Kobe or Osaka earthquake in 1995 and the record-breaking earthquake and tsunami that destroyed northern Japan in March 2011. Gordon B. Hinckley, then serving as the church's president, traveled to Japan in May 1996. On September 1, 2001, the 100th anniversary of the church's missionary work in Japan was celebrated with two new bronze monuments in Yokohama. The Fukuoka Japan Temple was dedicated in 2000, with the Sapporo Japan Temple, the third in Japan, dedicated in 2016. In 2017, the Tokyo Japan Temple was closed for renovations and rededicated in July 2022. The fourth, the Okinawa Japan Temple, was dedicated in November 2023. In October 2023, church president Russell M. Nelson announced the intent to construct the Osaka Japan Temple.

== Recent problems ==
Two events that created challenges to Latter-day Saint missionary work in Japan were the death of Emperor Hirohito in 1989 and the Tokyo subway attack in 1995 by the religious group Aum Shinrikyō. The death of the emperor made Japanese citizens reevaluate the role of the emperor in the state and in their lives. Even though the period after WWII had been characterized by a "de-deification" of the emperor, after the death of Emperor Hirohito, his death rituals were widely publicized. This reignited an interest in old Japanese symbols, rites, and rituals. Due to deeply rooted religious and cultural belief systems that have lasted for centuries, converting to another religion was associated with becoming non-Japanese. The second event that created challenges for LDS missionaries in Japan was the Tokyo subway sarin attack by Aum Shinrikyō. This attack, which killed twelve and injured more than five thousand people, greatly affected the Japanese people. It caused fear of and a resentment to Japanese New Religions and the Japanese people had a hard time distinguishing between proselytizing LDS missionaries and New Religions.

=== Cultural obstacles ===
Japan is culturally and historically a non-Christian nation. This poses problems in LDS missionary work, because the Japanese are culturally not familiar with the western notion of God. However, despite the Japanese unfamiliarity with Christian or Western religiosity, the Japanese are a religious people. Many Japanese people state to be a part of one or more religion, mostly Shinto and Buddhism and these religions affect their world view deeply. Thus, the cultural differences in ethics and morality challenge missionary work.

Another cultural difference is the impact of Confucian ethics. Western culture puts emphasis on the individual, while Japanese culture values the group over the individual. The Japanese culture values harmony over individual ambition and aggressiveness. Large decisions are often made together. For example, a Japanese person may be more willing to be baptized if their family joined them in their decision. If not, they will likely not choose to be baptized, in order to avoid isolation from their family. Mormonism emphasizes individual agency and the individual's relationship with Jesus Christ, values which make Mormon baptism in Japan less likely.

Several scholars have pointed out that little study has been made of the internal factors that have limited the success of the LDS missions in Japan. Specifically, the distinctiveness of LDS culture, as well as its specific American characteristics, may have limited to what extent the Japanese have accepted Mormonism.

== Statistics and other information ==
As of year-end 2024, the LDS Church reported 129,622 members, 7 missions, 230 congregations, and 4 temples in Japan with one additional temple announced. There were also 22 stakes, 11 districts, 143 wards, and 88 branches at that time.

While Japan has 63 family history centers, the website FamilySearch, through which LDS members do genealogical research and perform ordinances, is not generally available in Japan.

=== Stakes and Districts ===
As of May 2025, Japan had the following stakes and districts:

Stake/District	Organized	Mission	Temple District
Aomori Japan District	26 Apr 1987	Japan Sendai	Sapporo Japan
Chiba Japan Stake	25 Mar 1979	Japan Tokyo North	Tokyo Japan
Fukuoka Japan Stake	20 Apr 1979	Japan Fukuoka	Fukuoka Japan
Hiroshima Japan Stake	31 May 1981	Japan Fukuoka	Fukuoka Japan
Hokkaido Japan North Stake	13 Aug 1978	Japan Sapporo	Sapporo Japan
Hokkaido Japan South Stake	29 Jun 1980	Japan Sapporo	Sapporo Japan
Kagoshima Japan District	17 Jun 1973	Japan Fukuoka	Fukuoka Japan
Kanagawa Japan Stake	27 Oct 1974	Japan Tokyo South	Tokyo Japan
Kanazawa Japan Stake	5 Mar 2000	Japan Nagoya	Tokyo Japan
Kiryu Japan Stake	10 Aug 1980	Japan Tokyo North	Tokyo Japan
Kobe Japan Stake	19 Mar 1980	Japan Kobe	Tokyo Japan
Koriyama Japan District	5 Mar 1985	Japan Sendai	Tokyo Japan
Kumamoto Japan Stake	18 May 1997	Japan Fukuoka	Fukuoka Japan
Kyoto Japan Stake	31 May 1992	Japan Kobe	Tokyo Japan
Matsudo Japan Stake	13 Sep 1992	Japan Tokyo North	Tokyo Japan
Morioka Japan District	9 Jul 1978	Japan Sendai	Sapporo Japan
Nagano Japan District	6 Apr 1984	Japan Nagoya	Tokyo Japan
Nagoya Japan East Stake	8 Nov 1998	Japan Nagoya	Tokyo Japan
Nagoya Japan Stake	10 May 1978	Japan Nagoya	Tokyo Japan
Niigata Japan District	21 Feb 1971	Japan Tokyo North	Tokyo Japan
Okayama Japan Stake	20 Mar 1983	Japan Kobe	Fukuoka Japan
Okinawa Japan Military District	1 May 1952	Japan Fukuoka	Okinawa Japan
Okinawa Japan Stake	23 Oct 1980	Japan Fukuoka	Okinawa Japan
Osaka Japan Stake	12 Sep 1972	Japan Kobe	Tokyo Japan
Sendai Japan Stake	2 Nov 1980	Japan Sendai	Tokyo Japan
Shikoku Japan District	1 Sep 1968	Japan Kobe	Fukuoka Japan
Shizuoka Japan Stake	21 Apr 1981	Japan Nagoya	Tokyo Japan
Tokyo Japan South Stake (English)	1 Jun 2003	Japan Tokyo South	Tokyo Japan
Tokyo Japan Stake	15 Mar 1970	Japan Tokyo South	Tokyo Japan
Tokyo Japan West Stake	26 Oct 1980	Japan Tokyo South	Tokyo Japan
Yamaguchi Japan District	1 Dec 1970	Japan Fukuoka	Fukuoka Japan

=== Missions ===
Over the years, border shifts, mission dissolutions, additions, and consolidations have affected all missions in Japan. From 1984 to 1995 there were ten missions in Japan; as of July 1, 2019, there were six.

Mission	Organized	Notes
Japan Fukuoka Mission	18 March 1970	
Japan Kobe Mission	1 September 1968	
Japan Nagoya Mission	1 August 1973	
Japan Sapporo Mission	16 March 1970	expanded July 2019 from consolidation of Sapporo Mission with northern portions of Sendai Mission
Japan Sendai Mission	1 July 1974	originally created in 1974, merged with neighboring missions in 2019. Recreated from neighboring missions in 2024
Japan Tokyo North Mission	12 August 1901	re-created July 2019 from consolidation of northern portions of Tokyo Mission and southern portions of Sendai Missions
Japan Tokyo South Mission	1 July 1978	re-created July 2013

=== Temples ===
On October 27, 1980, the Tokyo Japan Temple (formerly the Tokyo Temple) (東京神殿, Tōkyō Shinden) was dedicated. This was the first LDS temple in Asia and the first in a non-Christian country. Church president, Spencer W. Kimball, described it as "the most significant and important event in the history of Asia".

The Tokyo Temple was followed by the Fukuoka Japan Temple (福岡神殿, Fukuoka Shinden), dedicated on June 11, 2000, and the Sapporo Japan Temple (札幌神殿, Sapporo Shinden), dedicated on August 21, 2016. On April 7, 2019, the church announced a temple would be built in Okinawa City, Okinawa Prefecture. A groundbreaking, to signify the beginning of construction of the Okinawa Japan Temple, took place on December 5, 2020. The temple was dedicated in late 2023.

Temples in Japan

= Operating
= Under construction
= Announced
= Temporarily Closed

18. Tokyo Japan Temple; Official website; News & images	
Location: Announced: Groundbreaking: Dedicated: Rededicated: Size: Style:	Tokyo, Japan; 9 August 1975 by Spencer W. Kimball; 10 April 1978; 27 October 1980 by Spencer W. Kimball; 3 July 2022 by Henry B. Eyring; 53,997 sq ft (5,016.5 m^{2}) on a 1.22-acre (0.49 ha) site Modern, one spire - designed by Emil B. Fetzer
88. Fukuoka Japan Temple; Official website; News & images	
Location: Announced: Groundbreaking: Dedicated: Size: Style:	Fukuoka, Japan; 7 May 1998 by Gordon B. Hinckley; 20 March 1999 by L. Lionel Kendrick; 11 June 2000 by Gordon B. Hinckley; 10,700 sq ft (990 m^{2}) on a 1.25-acre (0.51 ha) site Classic modern, single-spire design - designed by Kanji Moriya and Church A&E Services
151. Sapporo Japan Temple; Official website; News & images	
Location: Announced: Groundbreaking: Dedicated: Size: Notes:	Sapporo, Japan; 3 October 2009 by Thomas S. Monson; 22 October 2011 by Gary E. Stevenson; 21 August 2016 by Russell M. Nelson; 48,480 sq ft (4,504 m^{2}) on a 9.8-acre (4.0 ha) site Ground was broken on 22 October 2011 by Gary E. Stevenson. Michael T. Ringwood and Koichi Aoyagi of the Seventy were also present.
186. Okinawa Japan Temple (Temporarily closed); Official website; News & images	
Location: Announced: Groundbreaking: Dedicated: Size: Notes:	Okinawa, Japan; 7 April 2019 by Russell M. Nelson; 5 December 2020 by Takashi Wada; 12 November 2023 by Gary E. Stevenson; 12,437 sq ft (1,155.4 m^{2}) on a 0.55-acre (0.22 ha) site - designed by McNicholas Architects | MGLM reopens 15 Dec 2026
336. Osaka Japan Temple (Site announced); Official website; News & images	
Location: Announced: Size:	Hirakata, Japan; 1 October 2023 by Russell M. Nelson; 34,320 sq ft (3,188 m^{2}) on a 10-acre (4.0 ha) site

== See also ==
- Bernard P. Brockbank
- Yuki Saito
- Yukihiro Matsumoto
- Kent Derricott
- Kent Gilbert
- Christianity in Japan

== Bibliography ==
- Adler, Jacob; Kamins, Robert M. (1984), "The Political Debut of Walter Murray Gibson" (PDF), The Hawaiian Journal of History, 18
- Andrade, Ernest (1996), Unconquerable Rebel : Robert W. Wilcox and Hawaiian Politics, 1880–1903, Niwot, Colorado: University Press of Colorado, ISBN 0-87081-417-6
- Britsch, Ralph Lanier (1968), Early Latter-Day Saint Missions to South and East Asia (Thesis), Claremont Graduate School and University Center, OCLC 39674131
- Britsch, Ralph Lanier (1992), "Asia, the Church in", in Ludlow, Daniel H (ed.), Encyclopedia of Mormonism, New York: Macmillan Publishing, pp. 75–81, ISBN 0-02-879602-0, OCLC 24502140
- Britsch, R. Lanier (1975), "The Closing of the Early Japan Mission", BYU Studies Quarterly, 15 (2): 171–190
- Brady, Frederick R. (1983), "Two Meiji Scholars Introduce the Mormons to Japan", BYU Studies Quarterly, 23 (2): 167–178
- "BYU Entertainers Leave for Expo '70 In Japan", Deseret News, p. B5, March 16, 1970
- "Country information: Japan", Church News Online Almanac, LDS Church News, January 29, 2010, archived from the original on 2023-08-02
- "Facts and Statistics-Japan", Newsroom, The Church of Jesus Christ of Latter-day Saints
- Gibson, Walter Murray (1881), Sanitary Instructions of Hawaiians: in the English and Hawaiian Languages (2 ed.), Honolulu: P.C. Advertiser Co.
- Grant, Heber J. (2002), "The Life and Ministry of Heber J. Grant", Teachings of Presidents of the Church: Heber J. Grant, LDS Church, LCCN 2004268057, OCLC 54500103
- "Groundbreaking Held For Sapporo Japan Temple", MormonNewsroom.org (News Release), LDS Church, October 22, 2011
- Hinckley, Gordon B. (March 1964), "The Church in the Orient", Improvement Era, 67 (3): 166–193
- "History of the Church in Japan", Mormon Newsroom, The Church of Jesus Christ of Latter-day Saints, 30 June 2016
- Hoffman, John P. (2007), Japanese Saints: Mormons in the land of the rising sun, Lanham, MD: Lexington Books, ISBN 978-0-7391-1689-0
- Josephson, Jason Ananda (2012), "The Invention of Religion in Japan", The University of Chicago Press Books, University of Chicago Press
- "LDS Display Draws Throngs at Expo '70", Deseret News, pp. B1, B2, March 16, 1970
- "Meetinghouse Locator", The Church of Jesus Christ of Latter-day Saints, archived from the original on 23 March 2018
- Mori, Komae; Harris, David W. (2005), The Other Side of the Rising Sun: Tatsui Sato and the growth of the Church of Jesus Christ of Latter-day Saints in Japan, Orem, UT: Granite Publishing and Distribution, ISBN 1-59936-004-7
- "Mormon Pavilion", The Desert Sun, no. 176, California Digital Newspaper Collection, 27 February 1970
- Neilson, Reid L.; Gessel, Van C., eds. (2006), Taking the Gospel to the Japanese 1901 to 2001, Provo, UT: Brigham Young University, ISBN 0-8425-2595-5
- "New mission presidents by area for 2013", LDS Church News, March 5, 2013, archived from the original on 2019-04-02
- "President Thomas S. Monson: 'Welcome to Conference'", Deseret News, October 3, 2009, archived from the original on October 8, 2009
- Renouard, Chelynne (29 March 2013), History of the Missionary Training Center, locations around the world, Deseret News, archived from the original on April 5, 2013
- Shill, Aaron (2012), "A classic dilemma: The translation of the Book of Mormon into Japanese", Deseret News, Deseret News Publishing Company
- Takagi, Shinji (2000), "Tomizo and Tokujiro: The First Japanese Mormons", BYU Studies Quarterly, 39 (2): 73–106
- Taylor, Scott (October 4, 2009), "Brigham City among five new locales for LDS temples", Deseret News, archived from the original on October 6, 2009
- Taylor, Scott (March 15, 2011), "LDS Church in Japan: Moving missionaries, making donations", Deseret News, Salt Lake City, Utah, archived from the original on March 18, 2011
- "This week in Church history", Church News, October 22, 2005, archived from the original on 2023-08-02
- Toshiko, Yanagida (2005), "Memoirs of the Relief Society in Japan, 1951–1991", BYU Studies Quarterly, 44 (2): 145–154
- "Upsurge reported in new chapels in Orient", LDS Church News, p. 12, April 18, 1964
- Walker, Ronald W. (1986), "Strangers in a Strange Land: Heber J. Grant and the Opening of the Japanese Mission", Journal of Mormon History, 13 (1): 20–43
- Wilkinson, Greg (2016). "Is the LDS Church a Japanese New Religion?". In Goodman, Michael A.; Properzi, Mauro (eds.). The Worldwide Church: Mormonism as a Global Religion. Provo, Utah: Brigham Young University Religious Studies Center. ISBN 9780842529730.
- Yukiko, Konno (1993), "Fujiya Nara: – ensign", ChurchofJesusChrist.org
