= Otokichi Ozaki =

Japanese poet (1904–1983)

Otokichi "Muin" Ozaki (尾崎音吉 (無音)) (November 1, 1904 – December 3, 1983) was a Japanese tanka poet who lived in Hawaii.

== Biography ==
Ozaki was born to Tomoya and Shobu Ozaki in Kochi prefecture, Japan on November 1, 1904. He moved to Hawaii when he was 12, joining his parents who were already living there in Kauleau on the Big Island. He attended Hilo High school. He got a job at the Hawaii Mainichi, a local Japanese language newspaper in 1920. In 1923 he was hired as a teacher by the Hilo Japanese language school. An avid poet, Ozaki was one of the founding members of the Gin-u shisha tanka poetry club in Hilo when it was established in 1923. Ozaki also was a consular agent for the Japanese Consulate General.

After the bombing of Pearl Harbor on December 7, 1941, Ozaki was arrested by the FBI and incarcerated in the mainland United States. For the next three years he was held in internment camps in Kilauea, Sand Island, Angel Island, Fort Sill, Camp Livingston, and Santa Fe. In May 1944, he reunited with his wife, Hideko, and his children, Earl, Carl, Alice, and Lily, in the Jerome War Relocation Center in Arkansas. They were later moved to the Tule Lake camp in California, and lived there until the end of the war. During this time, Ozaki wrote his poems in small letters on rice paper so that he could easily take them with him as he moved from camp to camp.

When Ozaki returned to Honolulu, where he worked at the Hawaii Times newspaper and joined the local tanka poetry society, the Cho-on Shisha. During his time there, he edited two poetry anthologies, one of which was by Yasutaro Soga. He also did extensive work for a charity in Okinawa, for which he earned the Order of the Sacred Treasure.

Ozaki died on December 3, 1983.

== See also ==
- Tokiji Takei
