= Okinawa Japan Temple =

Temple in Okinawa, Japan

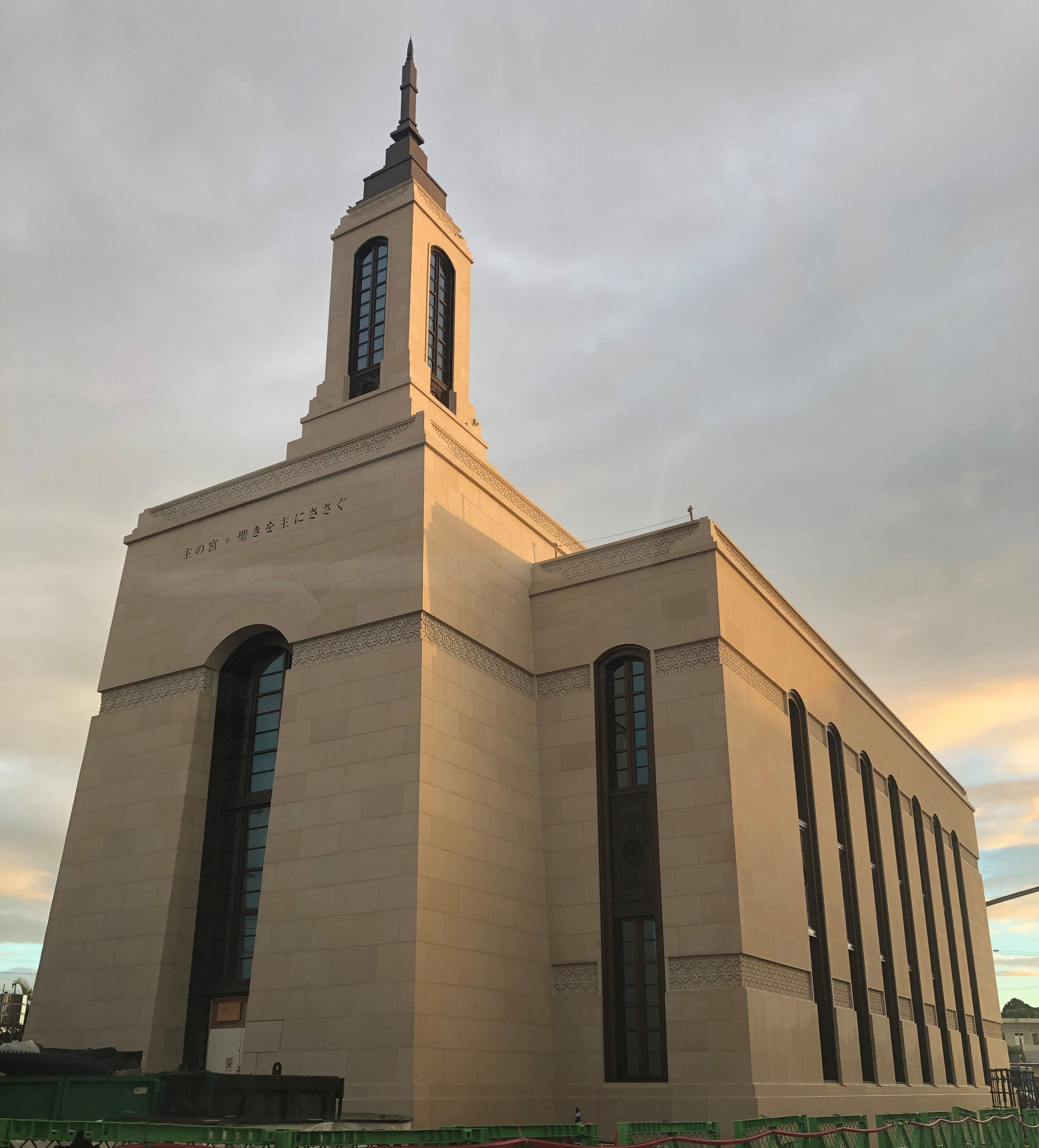
- Interactive map of Okinawa Japan Temple
- Number: 186
- Dedication: 12 November 2023, by Gary E. Stevenson
- Site: 0.55 acres (0.22 ha)
- Floor area: 12,437 ft^{2} (1,155.4 m^{2})
- Height: 105 ft (32 m)
- Official website • News & images

Church chronology
| ← Bangkok Thailand Temple | Okinawa Japan Temple | → Lima Peru Los Olivos Temple |

Additional information
- Announced: 7 April 2019, by Russell M. Nelson
- Groundbreaking: 5 December 2020, by Takashi Wada
- Open house: 23 September-8 October 2023
- Current president: Tsukasa Nagamine
- Designed by: McNicholas Architects | MGLM
- Location: Okinawa, Japan
- Coordinates: 26.3582°N 127.8016°E
- Baptistries: 1
- Ordinance rooms: 1
- Sealing rooms: 1

The Okinawa Japan Temple is a temple of the Church of Jesus Christ of Latter-day Saints in Okinawa, Japan. The intent to build the temple was announced on April 7, 2019, by church president Russell M. Nelson during the church's general conference. The temple is the first to be built on the island chain of Okinawa, and the fourth in the country of Japan. A groundbreaking ceremony, to signify the beginning of construction, was held on December 5, 2020, conducted by Takashi Wada, a church general authority.

== History ==
The intent to construct the temple was announced by church president Russell M. Nelson on April 7, 2019, concurrently with 7 other temples.

A groundbreaking, to signify the beginning of construction, was held on December 5, 2020, with Takashi Wada, president of the church's Asia North Area, presiding. The temple is a two-story 12,437 square foot building. A temple patron arrival center was added to an adjacent existing meetinghouse. The temple was dedicated on November 12, 2023, by Gary E. Stevenson.

The temple is the church's first to be built in Okinawa and the fourth in Japan, following the Tokyo (1980), Fukuoka (2000), and Sapporo (2016) temples.

According to the church, there are more than 130,000 Latter-day Saints spread throughout more than 260 congregations in Japan. The church has been in Japan since 1901. The temple serves native Japanese church members living on the islands, along with military personnel and their families assigned to Japan from other countries, such as the United States.

== Temple presidents ==
The church's temples are directed by a temple president and matron, each serving for a term of three years. The president and matron oversee the administration of temple operations and provide guidance and training for both temple patrons and staff. Since its dedication in 2023, the first president of the Okinawa Japan Temple is Hiroshi Kinjo, with Takako A. Kinjo as matron.

== Admittance ==
On August 8, 2023, the church announced that a public open house would be held from September 23–October 7, 2023 (excluding Sundays). The temple was dedicated by Gary E. Stevenson on November 12, 2023. Like all the church's temples, it is not used for Sunday worship services. To members of the church, temples are regarded as sacred houses of the Lord. Once dedicated, only church members with a current temple recommend can enter for worship.

== See also ==
Temples in Japan

= Operating
= Under construction
= Announced
= Temporarily Closed

- The Church of Jesus Christ of Latter-day Saints in Japan
- List of temples of The Church of Jesus Christ of Latter-day Saints

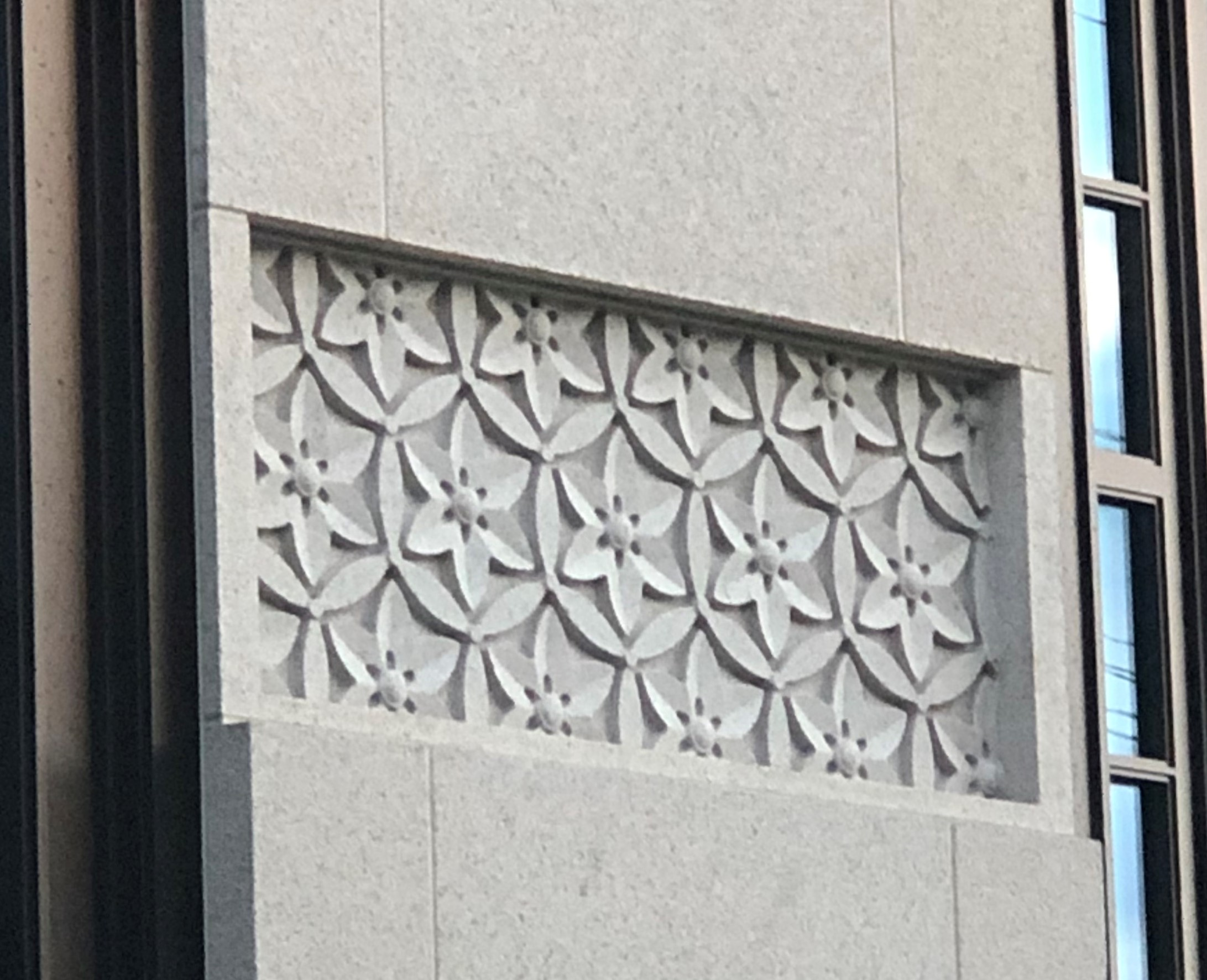
Side detail
