= Tomizo Katsunuma =

Japanese officer

Tomizo Katsunuma (勝沼富造) (November 16, 1863 – September 11, 1950) was a Japanese veterinarian and immigration inspector. He was also one of the first Japanese members of the Church of Jesus Christ of Latter-day Saints. He wrote under the penname Bashoan Shujin (馬笑庵主人).

== Early life and education ==
Katsunuma was born on November 16, 1863, in what is now Miharu, Fukushima. He was the third son of a samurai. He studied at the newly established middle school in Miharu, then studied English at a foreign language school in Sendai. He then went to school for a few years in Tokyo, but had to return home due to lack of funding. When he returned to Miharu, he worked as an English teacher in nearby villages. During this time Katsunuma earned a scholarship to become a veterinarian, and returned to Tokyo to study at what is now the University of Tokyo, Komaba Campus. After graduating in 1888, he became a researcher at the university.

== Career ==
After graduation Katsunuma heard that his brother was going to the United States to learn about the electrical industry there. Katsunuma decided to go with him, and ended up staying. He joined a group called the Patriotic League in San Francisco, which set him up with a job in Nampa, Idaho. He later relocated to Logan, Utah, where he enrolled in the Brigham Young College and studied theology and veterinary medicine. Katsunuma not only became an American citizen while living in Utah, but also converted to Mormonism. He was baptized on August 8, 1895.

Katsunuma was then asked by some friends from the Patriotic League to help recruit Japanese people to work on plantations in Hawaii. They would go there as Japanese government-sponsored immigrants called Kanyaku Imin. Katsunuma returned to Japan in 1898 and recruited laborers in Fukushima prefecture, charming them with his Tohoku dialect. He then moved to Honolulu with his wife, Mine, on July 26, 1898. He became an inspector for the Immigration Service, and served in that capacity until the Immigration Act of 1924 banned Japanese immigration.

While living in Hawaii, Katsunuma was a director of the Japanese Benevolent Association and a member of the Rotary Club of Honolulu. He became close friends with Yasutaro Soga, and worked to make the Yamato Shinbun (later renamed the Nippu Jiji) a daily newspaper. He also supported strikers during the 1909 Japanese strike, and called for improved working conditions. Katsunuma also worked closely with the Japanese Consulate and the growing Mormon mission.

Katsunuma died on September 11, 1950.

== Bibliography ==
- Katsunuma, Tomizo (1924). Kansho no shiborikasu.
