= Fred Kinzaburo Makino =

Territory of Hawaiʻi activist and newspaper publisher

Fred Kinzaburo Makino (フレッド 金三郎 牧野) (August 27, 1877 – February 17, 1953) was a Territory of Hawaiʻi newspaper publisher and community activist. He was the founder and first editor of the Hawaii Hochi, a Japanese-language newspaper for Japanese laborers. He advocated for workers rights, and led a strike in 1909. Makino also advocated against the regulation of Japanese-language schools.

== Early life ==
Makino was born in Yokohama on August 27, 1877. He was the third son of a British trader named Joseph Higgenbotham and a Japanese woman named Kin Makino. Higgenbotham died of typhoid fever when Makino was young.

After Makino was involved in an incident in Yoshiwara, he was sent to Hawaii in 1899 to help his brother, Jo Makino, who owned a small store in Naalehu on the Big Island. Makino quickly moved on to working as a bookkeeper for the Kona Sugar Company until 1901, when he moved to Oahu and opened a drug store in Honolulu. In 1903, after marrying his wife, Michie Okamura, he started an informal law practice for Japanese immigrants above his store. At the time, Japanese immigrants were not allowed to become lawyers, so he was able to fill a need within the community for legal assistance in Japanese.

== 1909 sugar strike ==
During the 1909 strike, one of the first large sugar plantation strikes in Hawaii, Makino founded the Zokyu Kisei Kai (Higher Wage Association) with Motoyuki Negoro and Yasutaro Soga, the editor of the Nippu Jiji. During the strike, they and two other strike leaders were jailed together for ten months and fined $300, though they only served four months. After he was released from prison, Makino returned to his drugstore to find that the Hawaii Sugar Plantation Association had stolen his account books while looking for union-related documents. He sued the HSPA with the assistance of lawyer Joseph B. Lightfoot, and settled out of court after the matter had become an international incident.

== The Hawaii Hochi ==
On December 7, 1912 Makino started the Hawaii Hochi as a Japanese-language newspaper for laborers. This was in response to Soga's changing attitude toward protests and resistance against the white plantation owners. The two men–and the two newspapers–would often clash about local issues. Throughout his career, Makino and the Hawaii Hochi would support Japanese and Filipino workers during the Oahu sugar strike of 1920, advocate for American citizenship for Japanese soldiers who fought in World War I, and speak out against the territorial government's attempts to regulate Japanese-language schools. Because he disagreed with many Japanese American community leaders, like Takie Okumura and the Japanese Consulate General, Makino was seen as a controversial figure.

In 1942, Makino temporarily renamed the Hawaii Hochi as the Hawaii Herald in order appear more American. This did not stop the newly-instated military government from temporarily shutting down the newspaper. Makino was interrogated by the FBI, but ultimately was not sent to the mainland and interned like his brother Seiichi Tsuchiya and other Japanese community leaders.

== Death and legacy ==
In 1949 Makino had a heart attack and grew steadily weaker until he died on February 17, 1953. When he became ill after the heart attack, he drew back from editing the Hochi, which in turn stopped advocating against social injustices.

The Hawaii Hochi is still being published in Japanese, and the Hawaii Herald is published in English.
