= Motoyuki Negoro =

Japanese journalist and strike leader

Motoyuki Negoro (根来源之) (June 14, 1875 – April 18, 1939) was a journalist and strike leader in Hawaii.

== Early life ==
Negoro was born in 1875 in Wakayama Prefecture, Japan. After attending school for a couple years in his hometown, he decided to go to America and study law. He earned a law degree from the University of California, Berkeley in 1903, one of the first awarded by the school.

== Hawaii ==
After graduation, Negoro moved to Hawaii, where he wrote for the Hawai Shimpo. Though he had a law degree, he was not allowed to practice because he was a resident alien, not a citizen. Instead, he was a clerk and interpreter at the Atkinson and Quarles law firm.

In 1908, Negoro, Yokichi Tasaka, Yasutaro Soga, and Fred Kinzaburo Makino, formed the Higher Wage Association (Zokyu Kisei Kai), and protested the low wages that Japanese plantation workers were paid. During the same year, Negoro began writing for the Nippu Jiji, which was published by Soga. He wrote articles that fanned the flames of the 1909 Sugar Strike, and established himself as one of the leaders. Negoro, Soga, and Makino were arrested during the strike and sentenced to ten months in jail and a $300 fine. They were pardoned and released after four months, on July 4, 1910.

After the strike broke, Negoro returned to Japan and worked in Makino's brother's trading company. In November 1914, Negoro came back to Hawaii and began writing for the Hawaii Hochi, Makino's newspaper and Nippu Jiji's competitor. In 1917, he returned to Japan for good. He died in Tokyo on April 18, 1939.

== Selected bibliography ==
- Negoro, Motoyuki (1908). The Anti-trust Legislation Under the Constitution. University of California.
- Negoro, Motoyuki (1915). Meiji 41 2nen hawai hojin katsuyakushi : Ichimei daihiko kaikoshi 明治四十一, 二年布哇邦人活躍史 : 一名・大罷工回顧史.
