= Kanazawa (disambiguation) =

Kanazawa is a major city in Ishikawa Prefecture, Japan. The term Kanazawa may also refer to:

- Kanazawa Castle
- Kanazawa College of Art
- Kanazawa Samuraiz basketball team
- Kanazawa Soccer Stadium
- Kanazawa Station
- Kanazawa (surname)
- Kanazawa University
- Kanazawa-ku, Yokohama
- NHK Kanazawa Broadcasting Station
- TV Kanazawa, a television station in Ishikawa Prefecture, Japan
- Zweigen Kanazawa

== See also ==
- Jinze
