= Clissold =

Clissold is a surname. Notable people with the surname include:

- Edward L. Clissold (died 1985), LDS leader
- Stephen Clissold (1825–1898), English cricketer
- Thomas Clissold, expedition cook
- Tim Clissold, financial author
