= Tokiji Takei =

Japanese poet and essayist

Tokiji "Sojin" Takei (竹井 時次 (蘇人))(April 6, 1903 – July 23, 1991) was a Japanese poet and essayist who lived in Hawaii. He was a prolific writer who is best known for his poetry written while he was incarcerated in a series of internment camps.

== Biography ==
Takei was born on April 6, 1903, in Asakura, Fukuoka, Japan. After graduating from high school in 1922, he moved to Maui to be with his parents, who already lived there. In 1924 he got his first job as a Japanese language school teacher in Kahului. He was hired by the Paia Japanese language school in 1930, then became the principal of Keahua's Japanese school. In his free time he wrote tanka and kanshi under the pen name Sojin Takei.

After the bombing of Pearl Harbor on December 7, 1941, Takei was arrested by the FBI and incarcerated in the mainland United States. For the next three years he was held in internment camps in Haiku, Maui; Sand Island, Angel Island, Lordsburg, and Santa Fe. In December 1944, he reunited with his wife, Yoshiko, and his children, Yoshimitsu and Junko, in the Crystal City Internment Camp in Texas. They lived there until the end of the war, and returned to Honolulu in December 1945.

Takei wrote poetry and essays, and was a member of poetry clubs throughout his time in camp. In Crystal City, he formed a tanka club with Motokazu Mori and compiled the camp's only poetry anthology, Nagareboshi.

After the war, Takei wrote for the Hawaii Hochi. He joined the Choon shisha, a poetry club in Honolulu, but later moved to another club in Manoa. He later moved to San Francisco, where he continued to write poetry until his death on July 23, 1991.

== Selected bibliography ==
- Takei, Sojin, ed. (1945). 流れ星. Crystal City, Texas: Tekisasu Shisha.
- Takei, Sojin (1946). 監禁 歌集 荒野. Honolulu, Hawaii: Hakuundō.

== See also ==
- Otokichi Ozaki
- Yasutaro Soga
