= Sei Soga =

Japanese activist and community leader in Hawaii

Sei Tanizawa Soga (相賀誠, Soga Sei; September 30, 1882 – August 8, 1970) was a Japanese activist and community leader in Hawaii. Her penname was Shigano Urako.

== Early life ==
Soga was born Sei Tanizawa on September 30, 1882 in Fukui prefecture, Japan. She was one of four children born to Ryuzo Tanizawa and his wife, Yasu. The family moved to Otsu in 1887. Soga's mother and brother died when she was eleven years old, so she took on the responsibility of managing a household at a young age. She graduated from high school in 1898. During high school she also helped in her father's campaign to be elected to the Diet. Once he was voted in, she went to Tokyo with him when the Diet was in session.

== Hawaii ==
Soga married Yasutaro Soga on January 9, 1911. After arriving in Honolulu later that year, Soga joined several social organizations including the Japanese Women's Society, the Women's Christian Temperance Union, and the Pan-Pacific Women's Organization. As part of the Japanese Women's Society, Soga served as head of the committee that supervised the organization's kindergarten for Japanese children born in Hawaii. Soga's husband was a prominent social figure, so she frequently entertained esteemed visitors like Hideki Yukawa and Shoji Hamada.

During World War II, when Yasutaro was incarcerated on the continent for four years, Soga volunteered with the American Red Cross and helped Shigeo, Yasutaro's son from his first marriage, manage the Hawaii Times.

Soga was well-known for her outspoken personality and commitment to Japanese traditions. While she assimilated into American society, she maintained her Japanese New Years' traditions, acted as a nakōdo for young couples, and had Shigeo and his wife live with her after they married. She and Yasutaro were also members of a local noh chanting group and a tanka poetry club. Soga wrote under the penname Shigano Urako (志賀野浦子).

Soga became an American citizen in 1954. She was awarded the Order of the Sacred Treasure in 1968 for her leadership in Hawaii's Japanese community. She died in Honolulu on August 8, 1970.
