= Sapporo Japan Temple =

Temple of The Church of Jesus Christ of Latter-day Saints

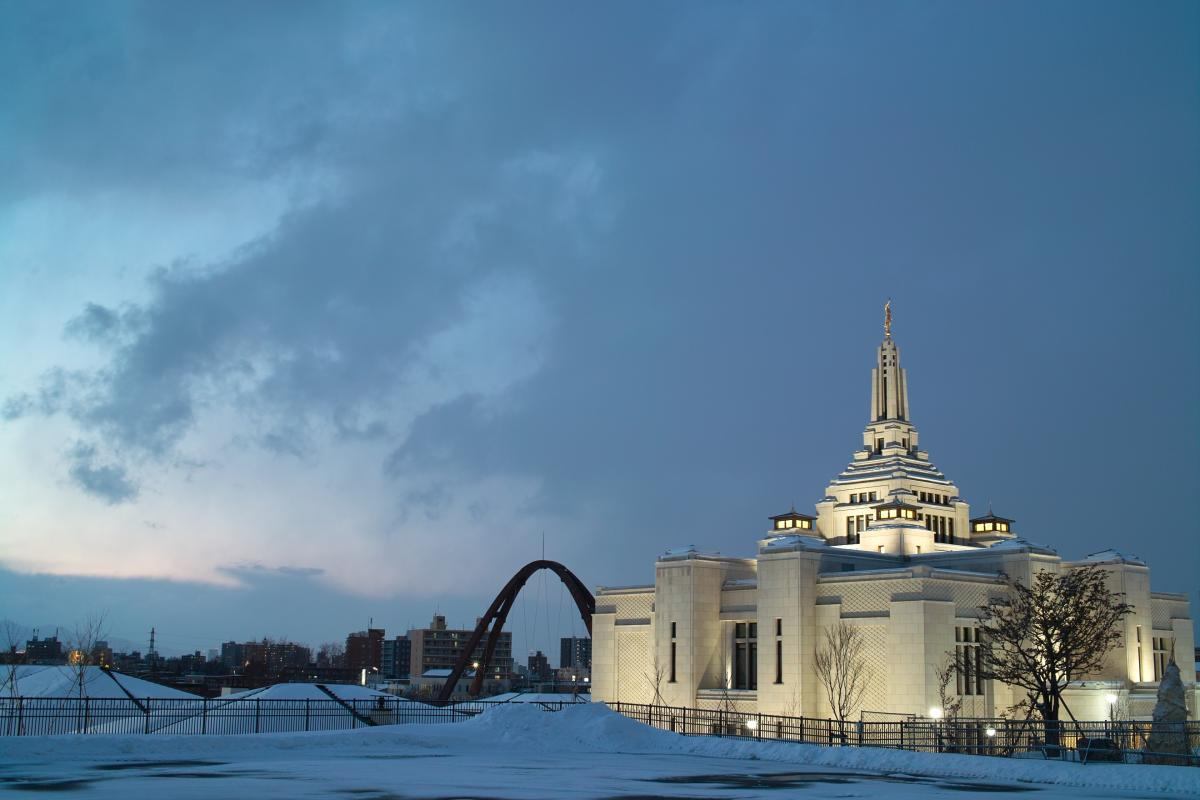
- Temple in winter 2016
- Interactive map of Sapporo Japan Temple
- Number: 151
- Dedication: 21 August 2016, by Russell M. Nelson
- Site: 9.8 acres (4.0 ha)
- Floor area: 48,480 ft^{2} (4,504 m^{2})
- Height: 127 ft (39 m)
- Official website • News & images

Church chronology
← Provo City Center Temple	Sapporo Japan Temple	→ Philadelphia Pennsylvania Temple

Additional information
- Announced: 3 October 2009, by Thomas S. Monson
- Groundbreaking: 22 October 2011, by Gary E. Stevenson
- Open house: 8 July 2016 – 23 July 2016
- Current president: Motoi Tsujimoto
- Location: Sapporo, Japan
- Coordinates: 43°1′28.7076″N 141°26′41.082″E
- Baptistries: 1
- Ordinance rooms: 2 (two-stage progressive)
- Sealing rooms: 3
- Notes: Ground was broken on 22 October 2011 by Gary E. Stevenson. Michael T. Ringwood and Koichi Aoyagi of the Seventy were also present.

The Sapporo Japan Temple (札幌神殿, Sapporo Shinden) is the 151st operating temple of the Church of Jesus Christ of Latter-day Saints and the third in Japan. Located in Sapporo, Hokkaido, the temple serves over 8,000 members residing on the island of Hokkaido and in Aomori Prefecture. The intent to construct the temple was announced by church president Thomas S. Monson on October 3, 2009, during general conference, concurrently with the Brigham City Utah, Concepción Chile, Fort Lauderdale Florida and Fortaleza Brazil temples. Ground was broken on 22 October 2011 by Gary E. Stevenson of the Seventy presiding. Michael T. Ringwood and Koichi Aoyagi, also of the Seventy also attended. After construction was completed, a public open house was held from July 8–23, 2016, excluding Sundays. The temple was dedicated by Russell M. Nelson on August 21, 2016.

== History ==
The church first established a missionary presence in Sapporo in 1905. The mission closed in 1924, leaving a small number of members, many of whom could not be located after World War II. Missionary efforts resumed in 1948 with the reopening of the mission, leading to renewed church growth in Hokkaidō. As of 2025, the church reports having more than 130,000 members in Japan.

The temple was announced by church president Thomas S. Monson on October 3, 2009, during general conference. It is the church's third in Japan, following those in Tokyo (dedicated in 1980) and Fukuoka (dedicated in 2000), and the eighth in Asia.

The temple site was announced on May 2, 2010, as a 9.8-acre parcel of land located in the Atsubetsu Ward of Sapporo, Hokkaidō. The property, formerly occupied by the Shin Sapporo Golf Center, is situated near Hokusei Gakuen University and adjacent to the Atsubetsu River. The site provides convenient access via the Hokkaidō Expressway and Ooyachi Subway Station.

A groundbreaking ceremony was held on October 22, 2011, and was presided over by Gary E. Stevenson, then president of the church's Asia North Area. Despite inclement weather, the event was attended by church members, local leaders, and guests, including former Prime Minister Yukio Hatoyama, who acknowledged the church's humanitarian contributions following the 2011 Tōhoku earthquake and tsunami.

Construction progressed on a planned three-story building encompassing approximately 48,480 square feet of floor space. The structure's exterior has granite quarried and carved in China, with a sea-wave motif.

After construction was completed, a public open house was held from July 8 through July 23, 2016, with over 13,000 visitors during that time. A cultural celebration took place on August 20, 2016, with 150 Latter-day Saint youth presenting musical and dance performances honoring both Japanese culture and the church's heritage in the country. The event was attended by community leaders and media representatives, and provided an introduction to Latter-day Saint beliefs, temple functions, and symbolic architecture.

The temple was dedicated on August 21, 2016, in three sessions by Russell M. Nelson, then serving as president of Quorum of the Twelve Apostles. The dedication was broadcast to congregations across Japan.

Since its dedication, the Sapporo Japan Temple has served Latter-day Saints in northern Japan and parts of northeastern Asia. Prior to its completion, many members traveled long distances to attend temples in Tokyo or Fukuoka.

In 2020, like all the church's others, the Sapporo Japan Temple was temporarily closed in response to the COVID-19 pandemic.

== Design and architecture ==
The building's design blends traditional church temple architecture with influences from Japanese architectural styles and art. It reflects both the cultural heritage of northern Japan and the spiritual purpose of Latter-day Saint temples.

=== Site ===
The 48,480-square-foot temple is located on a 9.8-acre site in the Atsubetsu Ward of Sapporo, adjacent to the Atsubetsu River and near Hokusei Gakuen University. The landscape includes Japanese-style gardens with native plants and trees, large landscaping stones, and a pond with a waterfall spanned by a pedestrian bridge—locally referred to as the “Rainbow Bridge” due to its colorful decorated circles and soaring arch. The site also includes an arrival center, patron housing, and other support buildings, such as missionary residences and offices for the Japan Sapporo Mission.

=== Exterior ===
The three-story structure's exterior has granite quarried and carved in China and has a sea-wave (seigaiha) motif, reflecting both the maritime setting of Hokkaidō and traditional Japanese aesthetics. The central tower was modeled after the Japanese National Diet Building in Tokyo and includes a stepped tower flanked by four smaller pagoda-like corner spires. The central tower features three rows of five windows, with the top row being the smallest, and upturned eaves typical of Japanese temple and shrine architecture.

A statue of the angel Moroni is on top of the central spire, which is accompanied by four smaller lantern-like spires. Art glass on the exterior displays frosted, geometric designs, including interlocking circular motifs resembling lilac flowers, which are associated with the local region. The inscription "Holiness to the Lord, The House of the Lord" is written in Japanese on the temple's front, consistent with all the church's temples.

Traditional Japanese decorative patterns are also used, including the shippo (seven jewels) and asanoha (hemp leaf) motifs on windows and other architectural elements.

=== Interior ===
The interior design uses traditional Japanese architectural elements such as latticework, wooden transoms, and coffered ceilings. Though the temple uses fixed walls, the woodwork evokes the look of traditional sliding shoji doors. A distinctive example is the sliding opaque lattice-style door between the ordinance rooms, replacing the curtain typically used in other temples.

Japanese influences are also seen in the furnishings, including the chapel woodwork, altars, and chairs, many of which replicate lattice-style motifs. The stained-glass windows also reflect similar patterns. The temple contains two ordinance rooms, three sealing rooms, and a baptistry, each with design elements reflecting traditional Japanese aesthetics.

Materials used throughout the interior were sourced globally but designed to evoke Japanese tradition. Flooring and base stones include marble from Israel (carved in China) arranged in patterns inspired by tatami mats, and Egyptian marble (carved in Italy) is used in the celestial and sealing rooms. Millwork is crafted from cherry wood and Japanese white birch, while hardware and light fixtures were produced in Japan using polished bronze.

=== Symbolism ===
Symbolism is used in the temple's design, consistent with Latter-day Saint traditions. The sea-wave motif represents the journey of life and spiritual renewal, while lilac flower patterns—seen in art glass and landscaping—symbolize purity and are native to the region.

Cultural symbolism is further reflected in the inclusion of a zen garden beneath the grand staircase, inspired by gardens at Ryōan-ji Temple in Kyoto. A genkan-style entryway, where patrons remove their shoes before entering, mirrors the custom in Japanese homes and is unique among Latter-day Saint temples.

Ordinance rooms are divided by shoji-style sliding doors rather than curtains, blending Japanese design with Latter-day Saint liturgical functions. A Japanese stone lantern on the temple grounds features traditional structural elements, such as a four-sided opening and upturned roof corners, rendered in a minimalist style consistent with church architecture.

Additional symbolism includes the lilac flower motif combined with the circle and square—a common temple symbol representing heaven and earth—illustrating the fusion of Japanese cultural forms with church beliefs and architectural expression.

== Temple presidents ==
The church's temples are directed by a temple president and matron, each typically serving for a term of three years. The president and matron oversee the administration of temple operations and provide guidance and training for both temple patrons and staff.

Serving from 2016 to 2019, Bin Kikuchi was the first president, with Hiroko Kanesaki Kikuchi serving as temple matron. As of 2025, Motoi Tsujimoto is the president, with Emiko Sugawara Tsujimoto, serving as matron.

== Admittance ==
On May 23, 2016, the church announced the public open house that was held from July 8 through July 23, 2016, excluding Sundays. During the open house, members of the public were invited to tour the temple and receive explanations about its purposes. The temple was subsequently dedicated by Russell M. Nelson, president of the Quorum of the Twelve Apostles, on August 21, 2016.

Like all the church's temples, it is not used for Sunday worship services. To members of the church, temples are regarded as sacred houses of the Lord, where members make covenants to serve Jesus Christ and other people. Once dedicated, only church members with a current temple recommend can enter for worship.

== See also ==
- Comparison of temples of The Church of Jesus Christ of Latter-day Saints
- List of temples of The Church of Jesus Christ of Latter-day Saints
- List of temples of The Church of Jesus Christ of Latter-day Saints by geographic region
- Temple architecture (Latter-day Saints)
- The Church of Jesus Christ of Latter-day Saints in Japan

Temples in Japan

= Operating
= Under construction
= Announced
= Temporarily Closed
