= Tokyo Japan Temple =

LDS Temple in Tokyo, Japan

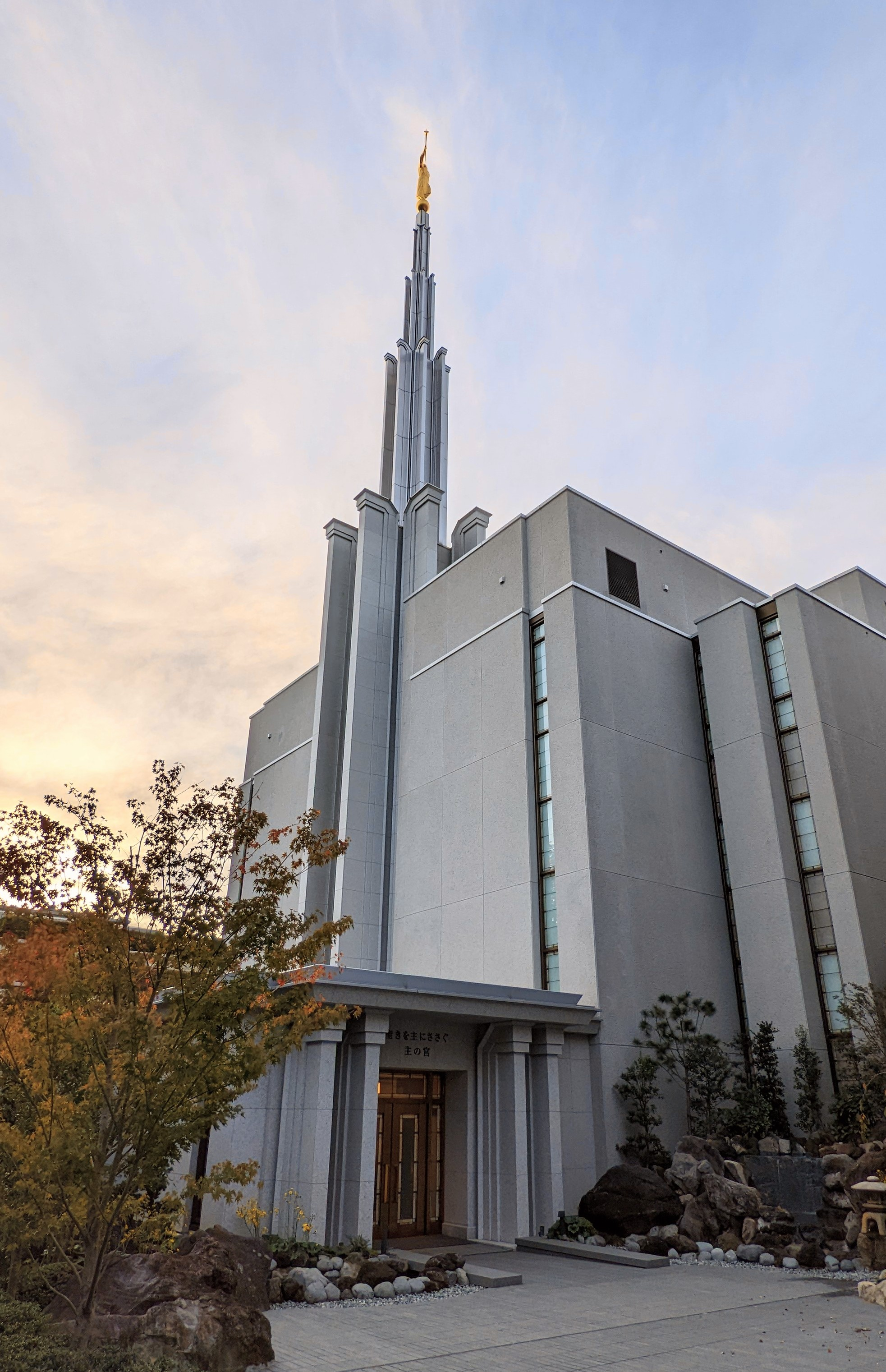
- Interactive map of Tokyo Japan Temple
- Number: 18
- Dedication: 27 October 1980, by Spencer W. Kimball
- Site: 1.22 acres (0.49 ha)
- Floor area: 53,997 ft^{2} (5,016.5 m^{2})
- Height: 178 ft (54 m)
- Official website • News & images

Church chronology
← São Paulo Brazil Temple	Tokyo Japan Temple	→ Seattle Washington Temple

Additional information
- Announced: 9 August 1975, by Spencer W. Kimball
- Groundbreaking: 10 April 1978
- Open house: 15 September – 18 October 1980; 3–18 June 2022 (following renovation)
- Rededicated: 3 July 2022, by Henry B. Eyring
- Current president: Masamichi Kudo
- Designed by: Emil B. Fetzer
- Location: Tokyo, Japan
- Coordinates: 35°39′10.21680″N 139°43′28.34039″E
- Exterior finish: 289 panels of precast stone which resembles light gray granite
- Design: Modern, one spire
- Baptistries: 1
- Ordinance rooms: 2 (stationary)
- Sealing rooms: 5
- Clothing rental: Yes
- Visitors' center: Yes

The Tokyo Japan Temple (formerly the Tokyo Temple) (東京神殿, Tōkyō Shinden) is the 20th constructed and 18th operating temple of the Church of Jesus Christ of Latter-day Saints (LDS Church). Located in Minato, Tokyo, Japan, and dedicated in 1980, it was the first temple built in Asia. Its compact style provided a model for later buildings in urban areas, such as the Hong Kong China and Manhattan New York temples.

The temple's design was inspired by Japanese architecture and culture. Following the announcement of the Tokyo Japan temple on August 9, 1975, groundbreaking took place on October 27, 1980; however, a traditional ceremony was not held since the mission home had already been constructed on the site.

== History ==
=== Church growth ===
A century prior to the construction of the Tokyo Japan Temple, Hirobumi Ito became the first Japanese individual to meet a member of the LDS Church, when he was in the United States on a mission from the government of Meiji Japan to study the financial system. In December 1871, the Meiji government dispatched the Iwakura Mission, a delegation of 100 influential figures, to tour the U.S. and Europe for a year and a half. During their travels, the mission became stranded in Utah due to heavy snowfall and spent time in Salt Lake City, the church's headquarters, where they visited various church businesses, schools, museums, and theaters, becoming the first participation in the church's meetings by Japanese individuals.

The LDS Church first sent missionaries to Japan in August 1901. Hijime Nakazawa was the first person baptized into the church in March 1902. Missionary activities were suspended from 1924 to 1947 due to difficulties faced by church members in practicing their faith during that period. After missionary work resume in 1948, the church experienced gradual and steady growth. In 1949, Matthew Cowley, of the church's Quorum of the Twelve Apostles, dedicated a mission home in Tokyo, during which he stated that Japan would one day have temples.

By 1965, the LDS Church had grown to 8,892 members in Japan. Church members in Tokyo traveled to visit the nearest temple, in Hawaii, with some individuals selling their possessions to fund their travels. This shows the dedication of Japanese members to participate in temple worship despite the geographical challenges.

=== The first temple in Japan ===
On August 9, 1975, the LDS Church announced plans to construct a temple in Tokyo, the first in Japan and Asia, and the 18th worldwide. The temple was constructed on the site of the former mission home in downtown Tokyo, which had to be demolished to accommodate the new structure. In 1976, Conan Grames, a former full-time missionary in Japan, returned to the country as an attorney and was later asked by church leaders to assist with legal matters surrounding the temple's construction.

After construction was completed, a public open house was held September 15 through October 18, 1980, with approximately 150,000 visitors attending. Church president Spencer W. Kimball dedicated the temple on October 27, 1980.

In the following years, an annex building was constructed to provide housing for temple missionaries and presidents, accommodations for out-of-town patrons, meeting facilities for a Tokyo ward, as well as dorm rooms and classrooms for the local Missionary Training Center. The annex was completed in July 1986 and included a small parking lot.

On December 10, 2004, an angel Moroni statue was added to the spire of the temple. The trumpet in the hand of statue Moroni's hand fell as a magnitude 5.9 earthquake struck Tokyo on July 23, 2005. No major damage was caused to the temple.

=== Renovation ===
The temple was closed for renovation on September 29, 2017, undergoing nearly five years of extensive upgrades. The renovation project included mechanical and seismic enhancements, improvements to the floor plan and temple grounds, and refurnishing which incorporated traditional Japanese design elements.

Additionally, the original annex was replaced with a new four-story subsidiary building featuring two basement levels for parking. This new facility includes patron housing, a FamilySearch Center, a distribution center, a reception area, chapels, a multipurpose room, and large classrooms, enhancing the capacity to serve the community. The annex was dedicated by Takashi Wada, president of the church's Asia North Area, on January 10, 2021.

==== Open house ====
Prior to the temple's rededication after renovation, a public open house was held from June 3 through June 18, 2022, excluding Sundays. A total of 19,000 people toured the interior of the temple, including influential people from various sectors such as government, commerce, education and religion.

==== Rededication ====
The renovation was originally anticipated to be completed in 2020. After delays due to the COVID-19 pandemic, the temple was rededicated by Henry B. Eyring, second counselor in the church's First Presidency on July 3, 2022.

As of 2024, three additional temples have been built in Japan (Fukuoka, Okinawa, and Sapporo) to serve more than 130,000 church members, with a fourth under construction in Osaka.

== Design and architecture ==
=== Site ===
The temple is situated on a remodeled 53,779-square-foot plot in a residential area of Tokyo, directly across from Arisugawa-no-miya Memorial Park. It is a five-minute walk from Hiroo Subway Station and is surrounded by schools and embassies. The temple's design reflects elements of Japanese culture, including Japanese maples and bamboo landscaping. Two shallow ponds and a waterfall enhance the serene atmosphere of the temple grounds. Adjacent to the temple is a four-story annex building that includes a visitors' center, an arrival center, and a FamilySearch Center.

=== Exterior ===
The exterior of the temple is reinforced concrete covered with 289 pre-made panels of stone, which look like light gray granite. The walls have been treated with a fresh coat of sealant. The temple is 70.5 feet tall at the main walls, with a 91.2-foot spire, and then the 16.7-foot statue of the angel Moroni. Art glass windows are included in the building. The main windows feature earthy-toned glass with carved, frosted center panels, while the side windows showcase simpler frosted designs.

=== Interior ===
The interior of the temple is compact, encompassing a total floor area of 52,590 square feet (4,886 m^{2}). It includes a parking garage in the basement and an apartment on one of the upper floors for the temple president. The temple contains two instruction rooms, five sealing rooms, and one baptistry. Interior design elements reflect Japanese culture, featuring Shibui-style furniture, traditional Shoji lantern-inspired fixtures, carpets with kimono patterns, art glass, fabrics, and historical Japanese art. The ordinance rooms include ornate crystal elements, and flooring materials vary, using stone, ceramic tile, and stone mosaics. Ceilings are primarily finished with painted gypsum board or stepped designs, complemented by trim in stained or painted wood. The temple features three distinct scenes: cherry blossoms, chrysanthemums, and pine trees.

=== Symbols ===
The temple's design uses symbolic elements that reflect Japanese art and culture, deepening the connection for worshippers. Symbolism is significant to church members, with examples including Shibui-style furniture that evokes a sense of reverence. The light fixtures, inspired by traditional Shoji lanterns, symbolize warmth and hospitality, contributing to a tranquil atmosphere.

The temple's visitors' center in the annex has interactive displays, paintings, sculptures, and high-definition photographs, providing members and non-members with a comprehensive understanding of the significance of temples, their unique role in church history, and the teachings of Jesus Christ.

== Temple presidents ==
The church's temples are directed by a temple president and matron, each serving for a term of three years. The president and matron oversee the administration of temple operations and provide guidance and training for both temple patrons and staff. As of 2024, Hideki Aoki is the president, with Setsuko Aoki as matron. They were originally appointed in 2017 just prior to the temple's closure for renovation, and began active service again after its dedication in 2022.

== Admittance ==
Following renovations completed in 2022, a public open house was held from June 3 to June 18, 2022. The temple was rededicated by Henry B. Eyring on July 3, 2022. Like all the church's temples, it is not used for Sunday worship services. To members of the church, temples are regarded as sacred houses of the Lord. Once dedicated, only church members with a current temple recommend can enter for worship.

== See also ==
- Comparison of temples of The Church of Jesus Christ of Latter-day Saints
- List of temples of The Church of Jesus Christ of Latter-day Saints
- List of temples of The Church of Jesus Christ of Latter-day Saints by geographic region
- Temple architecture (Latter-day Saints)
- Yoshihiko Kikuchi, a previous temple president

Temples in Japan

= Operating
= Under construction
= Announced
= Temporarily Closed
