= Kanazawa (surname) =

Kanazawa (written: 金沢 or 金澤) is a Japanese surname. Notable people with the surname include:

- Bunko Kanazawa (born 1979), Japanese actress
- Hiromasa Kanazawa (born 1983), Japanese football player
- Hiroshi Kanazawa, Japanese animator
- Hirokazu Kanazawa (1931–2019), Japanese karate instructor
- Jo Kanazawa (born 1976), Japanese football player
- Ryo Kanazawa (born 1988), Japanese football player
- Satoshi Kanazawa (born 1962), British psychologist
- Shimeji Kanazawa (1915–2014), Japanese-American social worker
- Shin Kanazawa (born 1983), Japanese football player
- Takafumi Kanazawa (born 1981), Japanese football player
- Takehito Kanazawa (born 1979), Japanese baseball player
- Takeshi Kanazawa (born 1984), Japanese baseball player
- Yvonne Kanazawa (born 1974), Japanese athlete
