= Shimeji Ryusaki Kanazawa =

- Born: December 29, 1915; Kamuela, Hawaiʻi
- Died: April 7, 2014 (aged 98)
- Education: Honorary Doctor of Humane Letters, UH Manoa
- Awards: George Washington Honor Medal, American Red Cross, UH Manoa Serving Heart Award

Shimeji "Shim" Ryusaki Kanazawa (December 29, 1915 – April 7, 2014) worked as a liaison to the Japanese community for the Swedish Consulate General after the Japanese Consulate General in Hawaiʻi shut down during World War II. She was called the "Florence Nightingale of Hawaii."

== Early life ==
Kanazawa was the first of eleven children born to Torazo and Saki Ryusaki. She grew up on her family's farm in Kamuela, Hawaiʻi. In addition to growing vegetables, the farm also raised pigs and chickens, and made products such as tofu and okolehao, or Hawaiʻian moonshine. After graduating from Hilo High School, Kanazawa worked as a stenographer for the Department of Public Instruction, and was then promoted to the Vocational Division of the Department in Honolulu. Afterwards, she became Secretary and Acting Principal at Kohala Elementary and High School.

== World War II ==
After the onset of World War II, the Japanese Consulate in Hawaii was closed and its duties were taken over by the Swedish Consulate. Gustaf Olson, the Vice Consul of Sweden, hired Kanazawa as an Executive Vice Secretary to mediate between the military government and the Japanese community in Hawaiʻi. Kanazawa not only performed official duties such as inspecting ships with Japanese prisoners of war to ensure humane treatment in accordance with international law, but performed many unofficial duties such as assisting wives of interned husbands in finding jobs, purchasing food and clothing for families in need, and accompanying families to internment camps to visit their sons and fathers. Many nicknamed her the "Florence Nightingale of Hawaiʻi" due to her actions. After the end of the war, she was awarded the American Red Cross for her humanitarian services.

== Post-war ==
After the war, Kanazawa met Kinji Kanazawa, who would shortly become her husband. After the two married they moved to Boston, where Kinji enrolled in the law program at Boston College and Kanazawa enrolled in the Chamberlain School of Retailing. Afterwards, the couple and their two children moved back to Hawaiʻi. In addition to raising her family, Kanazawa continued her work in helping the less fortunate and vulnerable. She served on many boards and commissions, including the Commission on Children and Youth which established the foundations of Hawaiʻi's Family Court, the Commission on Aging, the Planned Giving for Campaign 2000, the Faith in Action National Advisory Committee, the Hawaiʻi Summit 2011 Project, and the White House Conference on Aging. She founded and chaired Project Dana, a volunteer organization that provides free care for the elderly.
