= Hawaii Hochi =

Japanese-language newspaper in Hawaii, US

- Type: Semi-daily (six days a week) newspaper
- Owner: Shizuoka Shimbun
- Founder: Fred Kinzaburo Makino
- Publisher: Hawaii Hochi Ltd.
- Editor: Noriyoshi Kanaizumi
- Founded: 1912; 114 years ago
- Ceased publication: December 8, 2023
- Language: Japanese, English
- Headquarters: 917 Kokea Street, Honolulu, Hawaii 96817-4528; United States
- Circulation: 3,000
- Website: thehawaiihochi.com

The Hawaii Hochi (Japanese: ハワイ報知) was a six-day-a-week Japanese-language newspaper published and sold in Hawaiʻi from 1912 to 2023. An English-language edition was also published under the name Hawaii Herald, which relaunched in July 2024 as an online newspaper called The San Times.

== History ==
The Japanese edition of the newspaper was founded in 1912 to serve the Japanese immigrant community in Hawaiʻi. Founder Frederick Kinzaburo Makino had recently been released from a ten-month prison sentence for his role in organizing a 1909 labor strike among sugarcane plantation workers. Disappointed by existing newspapers' coverage of continuing labor disputes, Makino established the Hochi to present a "non-party and independent" perspective on the issues then facing Japanese Americans in Hawaiʻi. After some initial financial struggles, the Hochi became one of the primary sources for news related to political issues important to the island's Japanese community, publicly supporting legislation to extend Asian American citizenship rights and ease restrictions on Japanese language schools, as well as another strike in 1920. The paper was one of only a few to discuss racial inequality in the islands during the highly publicized Massie Trial of 1932.

An English section of the Hawaii Hochi, called "the Bee" for its sting, was introduced in 1925 in order to appeal to Nisei who were not fluent in Japanese. During World War II, the paper was renamed the Hawaii Herald in response to anti-Japanese sentiment. Unlike other prominent Japanese-language newspaper editors, like the Nippu Jiji's Yasutaro Soga, Makino managed to avoid incarceration, and in 1952 the Hochi returned to its original title. Makino died in 1953, and in 1962 the paper was purchased by Japanese newspaperman Konosuke Oishi. In 1969, Oishi created an English-only sister paper under the name Hawaii Herald. The Herald was discontinued after four years, but was brought back in 1980 and continued to run alongside the Hochi for 43 years until it was announced that its final issue would be published on December 1, 2023. The Hawaii Herald was relaunched in July 2024 as an online newspaper called The San Times. The new name is a reference to the word "Sansei."

At its peak in the early 1990s, the Hawaii Hochi had a circulation of 9,000. The number had dwindled to around 3,000 in 2009, but the paper continued delivery by mail. It was the only active Japanese-language semi-daily in the islands up until its final issue was published on December 7, 2023.

== See also ==
- Japanese language education in the United States
- Oahu sugar strike of 1920
- Japanese Wikipedia article contains a bilingual chronology of the company and its publications.
