= NHK Kanazawa Broadcasting Station =

Public broadcaster in Kanazawa, Japan

NHK Kanazawa (JOJK or JOJB)
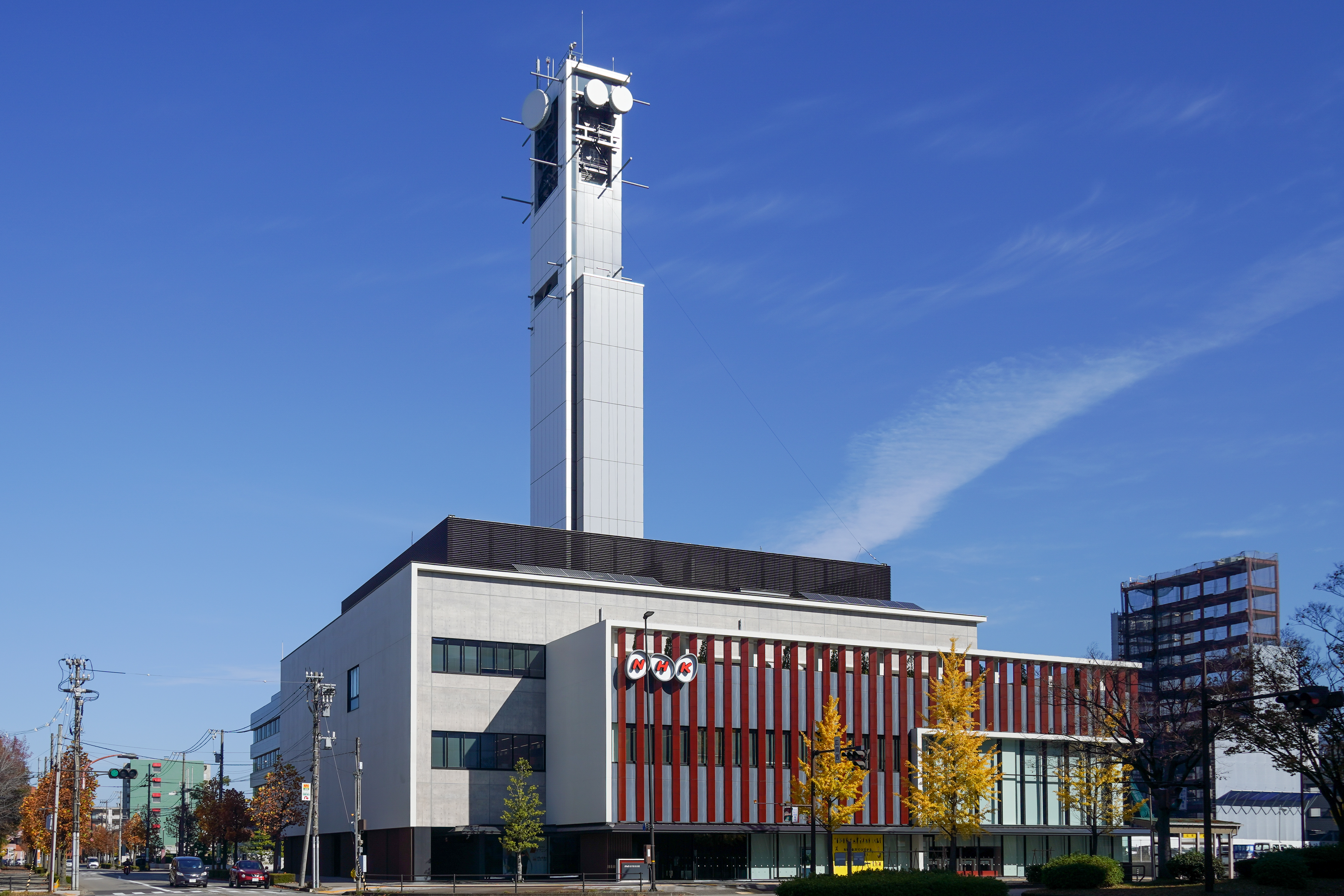
- West side view of NHK Kanazawa Broadcasting Station
- Kanazawa; Japan

History
- First air date: March 15, 1930

The NHK Kanazawa Broadcasting Station (NHK金沢放送局, NHK Kanazawa Hōsō Kyoku) is a unit of the NHK that oversees terrestrial broadcasting in Ishikawa Prefecture. Radio 1, FM and GTV use the JOJK calls; Radio 2 and ETV use JOJB.

== History ==
On September 17, 1928, NHK selected a site of approximately 10,000 square meters in Nanoichi for the facilities, which began broadcasting on December 1 of the same year. At the time, it operated as the NHK's Kanazawa branch of the Tokai subsidiary. An additional site in Tonomachi had its facilities completed on May 20, 1929. Later that year, on November 12, the call sign JOJK was approved for the station, and broadcasts began on April 15, 1930. The Nonoichi station was inaugurated in tandem.

On May 16, 1934, the station became independent in its own right, ceasing to be a dependency of the Tokai branch. During the war, it set up a branch in Niigata, under a five-year jurisdiction period for the Hokuriku and Shin'etsu regions. Radio control during the height of the war in 1944 led to an increase in power to 500W.

After the war, on August 21, 1947, NHK Radio 2 started broadcasting in Kanazawa, while on July 1, 1948, the callsigns JOJK and JOJB were assigned as part of a corporate decision. Both stations increased their output to 10kW on December 30, 1952. The Nanao station started on May 10, 1956.

Television broadcasts (JOJK-TV) began on December 23, 1957, with output of 1kW, the first Japanese television station overall on the Sea of Japan side of Honshu. Television output increased to 3kW on March 1, 1961. The new Kanazawa Broadcasting Hall opened on February 28, 1961, relocating its broadcasts there.

NHK Educational Television (JOJB-TV) started broadcasting to Ishikawa Prefecture on April 1, 1962, with an output of 3kW. On July 22, 1962, NHK General Television started airing color programming from the national network, while NHK Educational followed on April 1, 1964. Later that year, on July 1, FM test broadcasts started with an output of 1kW. The former Nonoichi station lost its staff on March 1, 1966.

The radio stations changed frequencies on April 1, 1968 (Radio 1, 1220 kc; Radio 2, 1370 kc), while the local Broadcasting Hall's expansion was completed on June 30. On March 1, 1969, NHK-FM started regular nationwide broadcasting. The film unit completed its conversion to colour on August 1, 1971, by the time colour television had become commonplace. Cameras were converted on February 1, 1972, completing the transition. The AM frequencies changed on November 23, 1978; on December 4, 1980, the station started employing portable minicams for its news coverage. On March 1, 1985, stereo television broadcasts began.

On November 9, 2018, the station moved to the New Broadcasting Hall in Hirooka. On May 29, 2023, station's local news was added to NHK+.

Following the effects of the Noto Peninsula earthquake on January 1, 2024, an estimated 700 families in the Wajima area had no access to radio or television broadcasts. On January 9, the former NHK BS Premium started carrying programming for the affected areas as a temporary measure. From 4 am on January 12, a large-scale relay of NHK General TV began, with news and emergency information. Radio and television signals were re-established in Wajima on January 24 after power was restored in the area. Considering the lack of cable service restoration in the affected areas as of March 26, it was decided that the satellite relay would be extended until after April. On June 30, emergency satellite broadcasts on channel 103 ended.
