= Yoshihiko Kikuchi =

Japanese Mormon leader

Yoshihiko Kikuchi 菊地良彦

First Quorum of the Seventy
- 1 October 1977 – 1 October 2011
- Called by: Spencer W. Kimball
- End reason: Granted general authority emeritus status

Emeritus General Authority
- 1 October 2011
- Called by: Thomas S. Monson

Personal details
- Born: 25 July 1941 (age 85)

Yoshihiko Kikuchi (菊地良彦, Kikuchi Yoshihiko; born 25 July 1941 in Japan) has been a general authority of the Church of Jesus Christ of Latter-day Saints (LDS Church) since 1977, and was the first native Asian to be called to that role.

Kikuchi was born on the island of Hokkaido. His father served in the military during the Second World War and was killed by an American torpedo while at sea. Kikuchi was baptized a member of the LDS Church when he was taught as a teenager by church missionaries from America in the 1950s.

== Biography ==
As a young man, Kikuchi served as a full-time missionary in the Northern Far East Mission for two and a half years, and a labor missionary for an additional year. He graduated in 1968 from Tokyo Asia University with a degree in Business Psychology and Management. After completing his education, he worked as a regional manager for Rena-Ware Distributors Company for the entire Japan area and eventually operated his own import export company.

During this time, Kikuchi was also continuing to serve in the LDS Church, including as president of one of the church's branches in Tokyo. When the Tokyo Stake, the first formed in Asia was organized, Kikuchi was called as first counselor in the stake presidency. He was later called as president of the Tokyo Stake. In 1977, Kikuchi was called into full-time church service as a general authority. He became a seventy and member of the First Quorum of the Seventy at the church's October 1977 general conference.

As a general authority, Kikuchi served as an assistant executive director in the temple department, as president of the Asia North Area, and as a counselor in the presidencies of the North America Northeast, North America Northwest, North America Central, North America East, Utah North area, as well as executive administrator in the Asia North Area.

From 1987 to 1989, Kikuchi served as president of the church's Hawaii Honolulu Mission. In 1987, Kikuchi was a keynote speaker at the first major African-American family history conference sponsored by the LDS Church. From 1994 to 1997, he served as president of the Tokyo Japan Temple.

On October 1, 2011, Kikuchi was released from the First Quorum of the Seventy and designated as an emeritus general authority.

Kikuchi is married to the former Toshiko Koshiya of Hokkaido, Japan. They are the parents of four children.
