= Fukuoka Japan Temple =

Latter Day Saint temple in Fukuoka, Japan

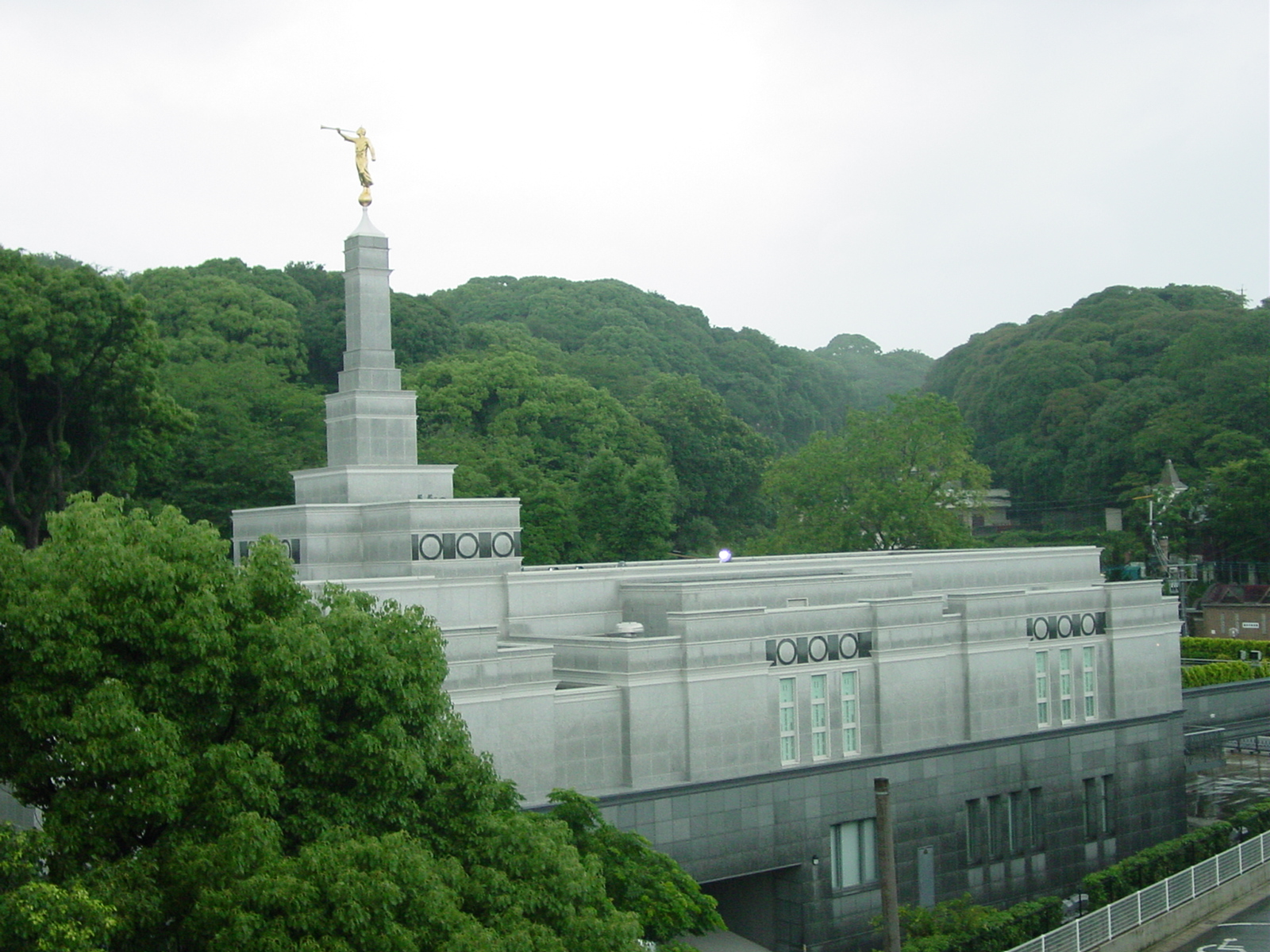
- Interactive map of Fukuoka Japan Temple
- Number: 88
- Dedication: 11 June 2000, by Gordon B. Hinckley
- Site: 1.25 acres (0.51 ha)
- Floor area: 10,700 ft^{2} (990 m^{2})
- Height: 71 ft (22 m)
- Official website • News & images

Church chronology
← San José Costa Rica Temple	Fukuoka Japan Temple	→ Adelaide Australia Temple

Additional information
- Announced: 7 May 1998, by Gordon B. Hinckley
- Groundbreaking: 20 March 1999, by L. Lionel Kendrick
- Open house: 1–3 June 2000
- Current president: Seiichiro Utagawa
- Designed by: Kanji Moriya and Church A&E Services
- Location: Fukuoka, Japan
- Coordinates: 33°34′21.42479″N 130°23′30.13440″E
- Exterior finish: Two tones of polished granite, Empress White and Majestic Grey, quarried in China
- Design: Classic modern, single-spire design
- Baptistries: 1
- Ordinance rooms: 2 (two-stage progressive)
- Sealing rooms: 2

The Fukuoka Japan Temple (福岡神殿, Fukuoka Shinden) is a temple of the Church of Jesus Christ of Latter-day Saints located in Fukuoka, Japan. It was announced on May 7, 1998, and later dedicated on June 11, 2000, by church president Gordon B. Hinckley. It became the church's 88th operating temple, the second in Japan (after Tokyo), and the first in southern Japan. The temple serves more than 7,700 members across the Kyushu, Okinawa, Yamaguchi, Hiroshima, and Shikoku regions.

== History ==
Church president Gordon B. Hinckley announced plans for a temple in Fukuoka on May 7, 1998. The groundbreaking and site dedication occurred on March 20, 1999, presided over by L. Lionel Kendrick, a general authority and president of the church's Asia North Area, with more than 500 church members in attendance.

The temple was constructed on land that been a center of church activity for a long time. In earlier decades, the site included a mission home and a former restaurant converted into a meetinghouse. Eugene M. Kitamura, a Fukuoka native, recalled that the area was once remote and accessible only by an unpaved road, and that church members had to travel as far as Hawaii to attend temple ordinances before the temple in Tokyo was completed in 1980.

During construction, the gold-leafed angel Moroni statue was placed on top of the spire on November 8, 1999. After construction was completed, a public open house was held from June 1 to 3, 2000, with about 4,800 visitors, including U.S. ambassador Tom Foley.

The temple was dedicated on June 11, 2000, by Hinckley, with four sessions held and 3,280 church members attending. He was accompanied by Jeffrey R. Holland, of the Quorum of the Twelve Apostles, and L. Lionel Kendrick of the Seventy Hinckley—who had overseen church affairs in Asia since the 1960s—was visibly emotional, remarking that it might be his final visit to Fukuoka.

The Fukuoka Japan Temple was the first of four temples dedicated by Hinckley during an Asia-Pacific tour that year, followed by the Adelaide Australia, Melbourne Australia, and Suva Fiji temples.

In the years following its dedication, the temple district experienced notable growth and modernization. In March 2018, the temple underwent an exterior lighting renovation, replacing mercury lamps with energy-efficient LED floodlights that enhanced brightness while reducing power use. Observers described the upgraded illumination as creating “a solemn and beautiful presence” on the hillside, its spire and Moroni statue a distinctive feature of Fukuoka’s nighttime skyline.

In 2020, like all the church's others, the Fukuoka Japan Temple was closed for a time in response to the COVID-19 pandemic.

== Design and architecture ==
The Fukuoka Japan Temple occupies 1.25 acres (0.5 ha) on a hillside overlooking the city. The structure is about 10,700 sq ft (994 m²) and is approximately 80 ft (25 m) high.

The building's exterior of polished Empress White and Majestic Grey granite from China contrasts upper and lower levels. The upper story includes the temple, while the lower level—faced with darker granite—contains the mission home, mission offices, temple president’s apartment, and parking garage.

Designed by Kozo Tashiro in a classic modern single-spire style, it resembles the Snowflake Arizona Temple. It has two progressive instruction rooms, two sealing rooms, and a baptistry, where the initiatory, endowment, sealing, and proxy baptism ordinances are performed.

Surrounded by wooded hills, the grounds feature landscaped walkways leading toward the front entrance. Nearby cultural landmarks include the Fukuoka City Art Museum, Science Museum, and Botanical Garden.

== Temple leadership and admittance ==
The church's temples are directed by a temple president and matron, each typically serving for a term of three years. The president and matron oversee the administration of temple operations and provide guidance and training for both temple patrons and staff. As of 2024, Seiichiro Utagawa is the president, with Mayumi I. Utagawa serving as matron.

Like all the church's temples, it is not used for Sunday worship services. To members of the church, temples are regarded as sacred houses of the Lord. Once dedicated, only church members with a current temple recommend can enter for worship.

== See also ==
- Comparison of temples of The Church of Jesus Christ of Latter-day Saints
- List of temples of The Church of Jesus Christ of Latter-day Saints
- List of temples of The Church of Jesus Christ of Latter-day Saints by geographic region
- Temple architecture (LDS Church)
- The Church of Jesus Christ of Latter-day Saints in Japan

Temples in Japan

= Operating
= Under construction
= Announced
= Temporarily Closed

== Additional reading ==
- Okata, Takuji (March 27, 1999), "Japan's second temple, in Fukuoka, celebrates groundbreaking", Church News
- Hill, Greg (June 17, 2000), "Church members rejoice over temple in southern Japan", Church News
- "'We have been on a long journey — but it was a great occasion'", Church News, July 1, 2000
- Hill, Greg (November 4, 2000), "Fukuoka: Japan's southern center", Church News
