= Edward L. Clissold =

Edward L. Clissold (died 1984) was a leader of the Church of Jesus Christ of Latter-day Saints (LDS Church) in both Hawaii and Japan.

Clissold was a resident of Hawaii by the early 1930s. From 1931 to 1932 he served as president of the Lions Club of Honolulu. From 1936 to 1938 Clissold served as president of the LDS Church's Hawaiian Temple.

Clissold was part of the United States military occupation forces in Japan after World War II. While there he ran an advertisement seeking out members of the LDS Church who had been baptized prior to the missionaries leaving the country in 1924. He was able to find some, including Fujiya Nara, and reestablish the church there. Prior to this, from 1943 to 1944, Clissold had been acting president of the LDS Church's Central Pacific Mission, a mission in Hawaii that was aimed at teaching primarily Japanese people. During this same time period Clissold served as president of the Hawaiian Temple, for a second time.

Clissold later served as president of the LDS Church's Hawaii Mission and the Japanese Mission from 1948 to 1949. He then served as president of the Oahu Stake when it included all of that island, starting in 1951. As president of the Oahu Stake he was closely involved with the development of the plan for the Polynesian Cultural Center (PCC). He also served as president of the PCC.

In 1955, Clissold was one of the incorporators of the Laie Community Association along with Woodruff J. Deem, Clinton Kanahele, V. Kehau Kawahigashi and George K. Kekauoha. Clissold was the first recipient of an honorary degree from the Church College of Hawaii (now Brigham Young University-Hawaii).

From 1963 to 1965, Clissold served as president of the Hawaiian Temple for a third time.
