= Michael T. Ringwood =

Authority on the Latter Day Saints

Presidency of the Seventy
- August 1, 2024 – present
- Called by: Russell M. Nelson

First Quorum of the Seventy
- April 4, 2009 – present
- Called by: Thomas S. Monson

Personal details
- Born: Michael Tally Ringwood; February 14, 1958 (age 68); Provo, Utah, United States

Michael Tally Ringwood (born February 14, 1958) has been a general authority of the Church of Jesus Christ of Latter-day Saints (LDS Church) since 2009.

Ringwood was born in Provo, Utah, to Sharon Lee and Howard Lee Ringwood. At the time, Howard was a football player for Brigham Young University (BYU).

Ringwood was raised in Salt Lake City and then went to BYU on a leadership scholarship. After a few semesters at BYU, Ringwood left to serve as a missionary for the LDS Church in South Korea. After his mission, Ringwood returned to BYU where he earned a bachelor's degree in accounting.

Prior to becoming a general authority, Ringwood was a businessman who spent fourteen years as a vice president with Huntsman Chemical Corporation, living in Houston, Virginia Beach, and Australia. In 2000, he left Huntsman Chemical and returned to Salt Lake City where he served as president of Bear Creek Foods, president of Lofthouse Foods, and the chief operating officer of Close To My Heart, a scrapbooking company.

== LDS Church service ==
In the LDS Church, Ringwood has been a bishop, president of the church's Korea Seoul West Mission (2004–07), and president of a University of Utah married student stake (2008–09).

In April 2009, Ringwood became a member of the First Quorum of the Seventy, a full-time ecclesiastical position. He first spoke at the LDS Church's general conference in 2009. In 2011, he was assigned as a counselor in the presidency of the church's Asia North Area and served as the area president from 2012 to 2015. In 2019, he was assigned to serve as the executive director of the Priesthood and Family Department, in which capacity he also serves on the Church Board of Education and as an adviser to the church's magazines. On August 1, 2024, Ringwood became a member of the Presidency of the Seventy and was also assigned to be a member of the executive committee of the Church Board of Education.

== Personal life ==
Ringwood and Rosalie Nelson, a daughter of Russell M. Nelson and Dantzel Nelson, were married in December 1982. Russell M. Nelson was the 17th president of the LDS Church. The Ringwoods are the parents of five children.
