= Keiho Soga =

American writer

Yasutaro (Keiho) Soga (相賀安太郎 渓芳, March 18, 1873 Tokyo - March 7, 1957) was a Hawaiian Issei journalist, poet and activist. He was a community leader among Hawaii's Japanese residents, serving as chief editor of the Nippu Jiji, then the largest Japanese-language newspaper in Hawaii and the mainland United States, and organizing efforts to foster positive Japan-U.S. relations and address discriminatory legislation, labor rights and other issues facing Japanese Americans. An accomplished news writer and tanka poet before the war, during his time in camp Soga authored one of the earliest memoirs of the wartime detention of Japanese Americans, Tessaku Seikatsu or Life Behind Barbed Wire.

== Life ==
Born Yasutaro Soga to a relatively wealthy family in Tokyo, he lost both parents while still a teenager. After studying for but not completing degrees in several subjects, Soga moved to Yokohama and took work as a retailer and exporter before relocating to Waianae, Hawai'i in 1896. He worked for plantation stores in Waianae, Waipahu and Moloka'i, and then moved to Honolulu in 1899, where he took a job as a reporter for the Hawaii Shimpo. In 1905, after leaving the Shimpo over a dispute with its editors, he became editor of the Yamato Shimbun, which he renamed the Nippu Jiji in November of the following year.

In 1908, Soga, Fred Kinzaburo Makino, Motoyuki Negoro, and Yoichi Tasaka formed the Higher Wage Association (Zokyu Kisei Kai). Together, they protested the low wages that Japanese plantation workers were making relative to other ethnic groups. In 1909, Soga used the Nippu Jiji to champion the cause of Japanese plantation workers then striking for higher wages. He became one of the leaders of the territory-wide strike and was later arrested and convicted of conspiracy with the other founders of the Higher Wage Association. His wife, Kozue Sugino, fell ill while Soga was in prison, and died soon after his release. He married Sei Tanizawa in 1911.

Soga was arrested within hours of the attack on Pearl Harbor on December 7, 1941, and, like many other Issei community leaders, spent the entire war confined in a series of detention centers run by the Army and the Justice Department. He spent the first several months of the war at the Army-run Sand Island Internment Camp, located at the entrance to Honolulu Harbor, before being transferred to the mainland. He arrived in San Francisco in August 1942 and was held at Fort McDowell for a month, after which he was again transferred to the Army internment camp at Lordsburg, New Mexico. In June 1943 he was moved to the DOJ camp at Santa Fe, where he would remain until October 1945. Soga returned to Hawai'i in November 1945 and published a memoir of his experiences in camp, first as a series of articles in the Hawaii Times (the Nippu Jiji's new title) and then as a book in 1948.

He continued to write poetry and publish articles for the Hawaii Times in the years after the war. In 1952, after the Walter-McCarren Act removed race-based restrictions on citizenship, Soga became a naturalized U.S. citizen. He published an autobiography, Gojunen no Hawaii Kaiko or Fifty Years of Hawaii Memories, in 1953. He died March 7, 1957.

== Awards ==
- 1985 American Book Award for Poets Behind Barbed Wire

== Works ==
- Keiho Soga; George Hoshida; Jiro Nakano; Kay Nakano (1983). Jiro Nakano; Kay Nakano (eds.). Poets behind barbed wire: Tanka poems. Translated by Jiro Nakano; Kay Nakano. Illustrator George Hoshida. Bamboo Ridge Press. ISBN 978-0-910043-05-2.

=== Memoir ===
- Keiho Soga (2007). Life behind barbed wire: the World War II internment memoirs of a Hawaiʻi Issei. Translated by Kihei Hirai. University of Hawaii Press. ISBN 978-0-8248-2033-6. "Keiho Soga."

=== Anthologies ===
- Steven Gould Axelrod; Camille Roman; Thomas J. Travisano, eds. (2005). The new anthology of American poetry. Vol. 1. Rutgers University Press. ISBN 978-0-8135-3164-9.
- Juliana Chang, ed. (1996). Quiet fire: a historical anthology of Asian American poetry, 1892-1970. The Asian American Writers' Workshop. ISBN 978-1-889876-02-3.
- Eric Edward Chock; Darrell H. Y. Lum, eds. (1986). The best of Bamboo ridge: the Hawaii writers' quarterly. Bamboo Ridge Press. ISBN 978-0-910043-08-3.

== See also ==
- Tokiji Takei
