= Consulate General of Japan, Honolulu =

Diplomatic facility

Coordinates: 21.3191°N 157.8542°W

Consulate-General of Japan, Honolulu 在ホノルル日本国総領事館
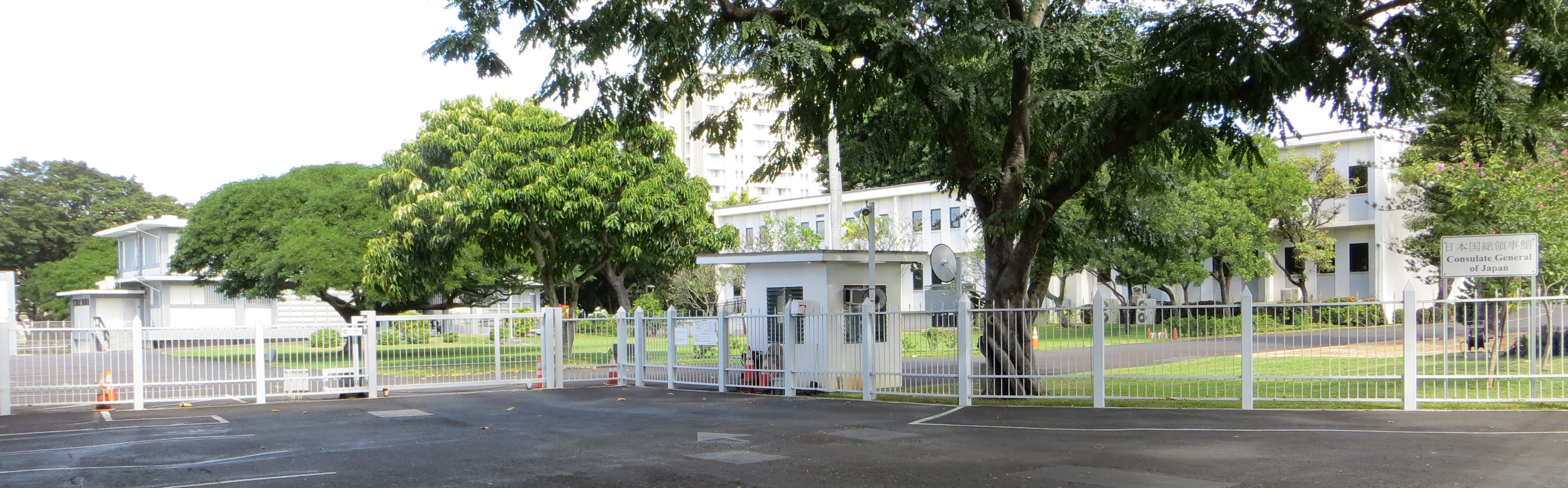
- Location: Honolulu, Hawaii, United States
- Address: 1742 Nuuanu Avenue

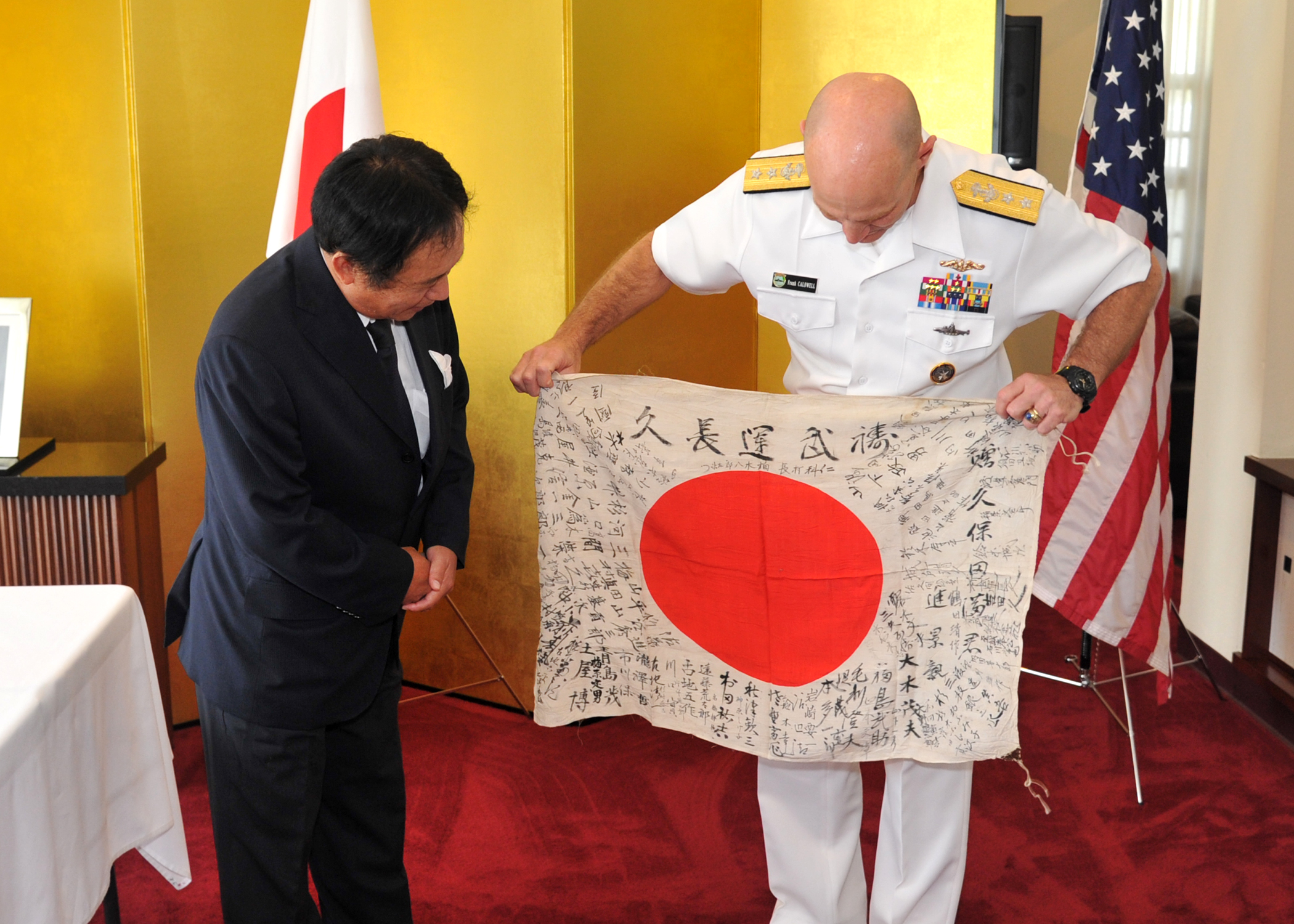
July 26, 2013) Rear Adm. James F. Caldwell, right, commander of Submarine Force U.S. Pacific Fleet, returns a hinomaru yosegaki, or a good luck flag, to Consul General of Japan Toyoei Shigeeda during a ceremony at the Consulate-General of Japan in Honolulu. Caldwell's uncle received the flag during World War II and Caldwell returned it to the Consul General in the hopes that it will eventually be returned to the family members of the former Japanese soldier. (U.S. Navy photo by Mass Communication Specialist 2nd Class David Kolmel/Released) 130729-N-TX154-207

Japanese Consulate-General, Honolulu (在ホノルル日本国総領事館, Zai Honoruru Nippon-koku Sōryōjikan) is Japan's diplomatic facility in the City and County of Honolulu, Hawaii, United States. The facility is located at 1742 Nuuanu Avenue. The facility's jurisdiction includes Hawaii and American Samoa.

As of January 2024 the Consul General is Yoshinori Kodama.

== History ==
In 1885 Japan's first consular facility, Consular Office of Japan, opened within the Royal Hawaiian Hotel; as of 2008 the facility now houses the Hawaii State Art Museum. The Japanese government upgraded the facility to a consulate-general on November 17 of that year. On February 14, 1886, Taro Ando, a gannenmono who had become Japan's first consul general in the Kingdom of Hawaii, purchased land from Judge M.A. Austin; Ando opened the Japanese consulate on the parcel at the intersection of Nuuanu Street and Kuakini Street; the facility included the residence and the business office.

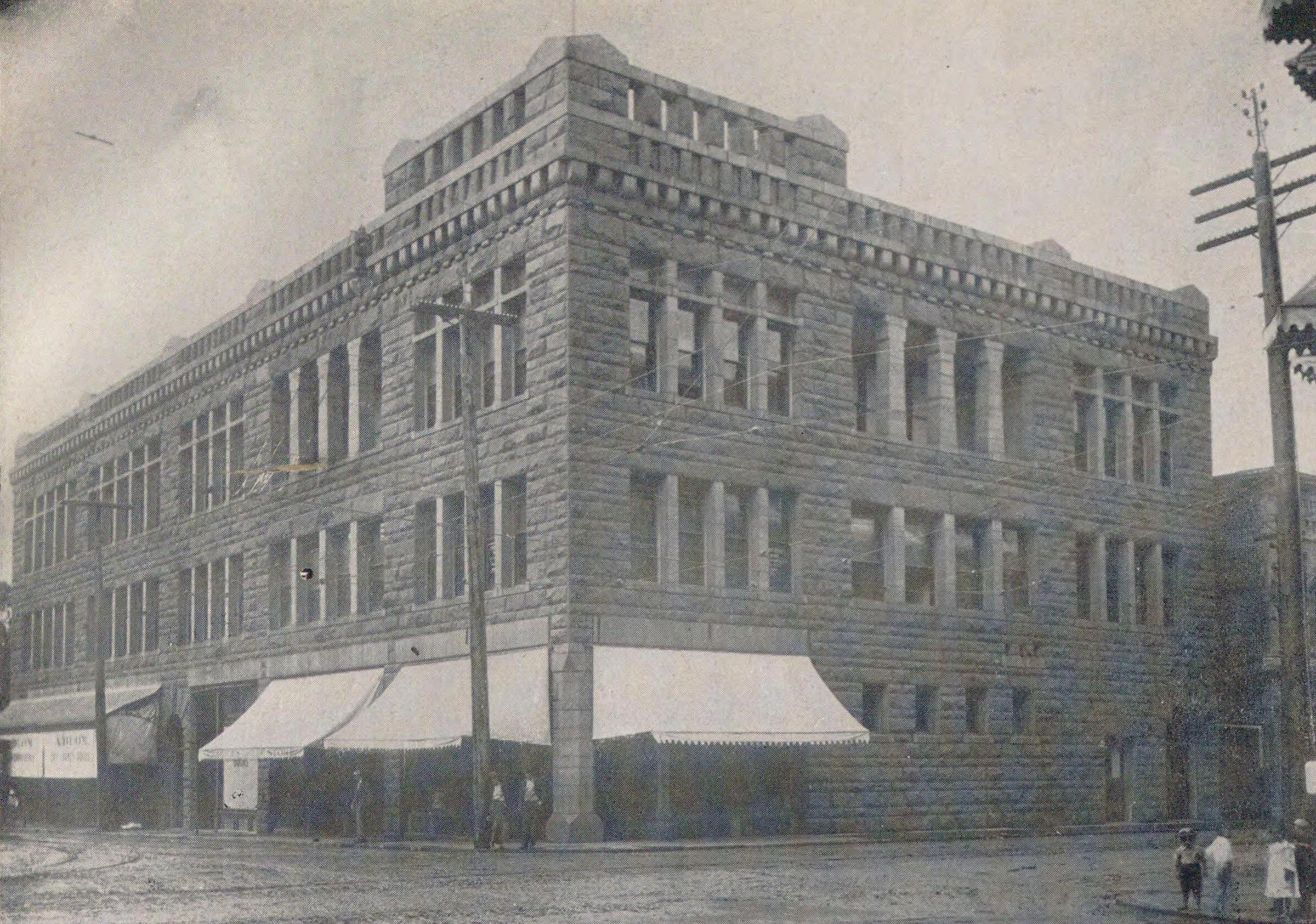
The consulate at Beretania Street and Fort Street in 1911.

In 1908 the consulate purchased a building at the intersection of Beretania Street and Fort Street. The three-story stone office building became the consulate-general facility while the original building at the intersection of Nuuanu Street and Kuakini Street became the residence of the consul general. The consulate sold the building in 1913, and as of 2008 the building houses classrooms for Hawaii Pacific University. The consulate bought a property neighboring the Beretania and Fort building from Mrs. Judd. The 13,400-square-foot (1,240 m^{2}) grounds included a new consul general residence and office space. Around 1920 the two-story wood main building, located in a well-to-do neighborhood, had a gold imperial chrysanthemum crest in the front.

When the United States joined World War II, the government placed the consulate staff under house arrest; Swedish Vice Consul, Gustaf Olsen, occupied Japanese consulate and provided services for Japanese residents in March 1942; many of the Japanese served by the Honolulu consulate found their primary income members placed under internment. The normal operation of the consulate was re-established after the signing of the San Francisco Peace Treaty became effective on April 28, 1952. Since then the consulate served business and tourist traffic from its home country.

== See also ==
- Diplomatic missions of Japan
