= Nippu Jiji =

Japanese-English newspaper in Honolulu

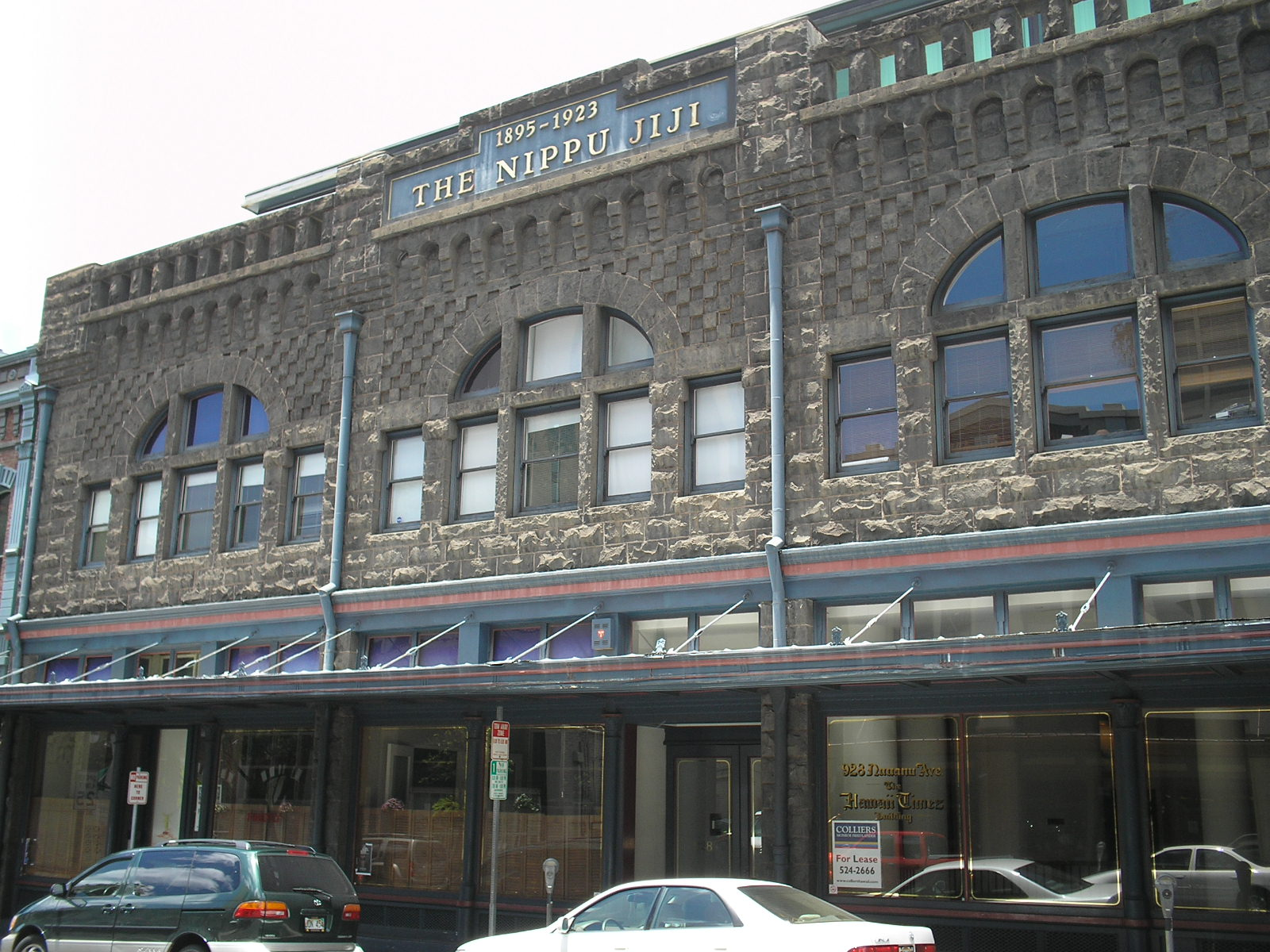
- The Nippu Jiji Building in downtown Honolulu
- Type: Daily newspaper
- Founder: Shintaro Anno
- Founded: 1895
- Ceased publication: 1985
- Language: Japanese/English
- City: Honolulu, Hawaii
- Country: United States
- OCLC number: 11531532
- Free online archives: hojishinbun.hoover.org

The Nippu Jiji (日布時事, nippu jiji), later published as the Hawaii Times, was a Japanese-English language newspaper based in Honolulu, Hawai'i. Established as the Yamato Shimbun by Shintaro Anno in 1895, the paper began as a six-page semi-weekly printed on a lithograph machine, and changed hands four times before being taken over by Yasutaro "Keiho" Soga in 1905. Soga changed the name of the paper to the Nippu Jiji, Japanese for "newspaper for telling timely news," on November 3, 1906, and under his direction the paper was expanded to a twelve-page daily printed on a rotary press with a circulation of 15,000.

The paper gained prominence through its support of the territory-wide strikes of sugarcane plantation workers in 1909 and 1920, publishing sympathetic editorial columns and featuring extensive reports on the often slave-like living and working conditions of the, in many cases indentured, laborers. Also active in covering legislative attempts to curb the practice of Japanese language education in the islands (and the subsequent lawsuit against the territorial government), the Nippu Jiji became a key source of information for Japanese Americans in Hawaii before World War II and continued to wield a significant influence through the war years and after. The paper ceased operations in 1985.

== Early history ==
In its early years, the Nippu Jiji was a paper directed at Hawaii's Japanese plantation workers. These laborers and, later, their families, made up the bulk of its subscription, and so the paper's content was largely catered to their interests and concerns. In 1909, exploitative conditions on the plantations was at the top of the list, and under Yasutaro Soga's direction the Nippu Jiji became active in disseminating information related to the newly formed labor movement. The paper published in-depth accounts of the conditions in the fields and company housing, pushing the issue further into the public eye and pulling plantation owners and haole politicians into the debate. The strike failed, although it was the first to unite workers from multiple plantations and the island-wide work stoppage ultimately cost plantation owners $2,000,000 and forced them to make some concessions. Soga was convicted of conspiracy to incite violence for his role in organizing the strike, and sentenced to ten months in Oahu Prison. Some ten years later, the Nippu Jiji similarly supported a second, also unsuccessful, strike.

In 1919, the Nippu Jiji became the first Japanese language newspaper in Hawaii to introduce an English section, an attempt to reach out to American-born Nisei and, in Soga's words, "promote better understanding between the Japanese and the Americans." It was also a move to counteract widespread distrust of Japanese Americans, heightened by Japan's military successes in Russia and China, as well as the fact that the immigrant Issei and their children had by then become the islands' largest ethnic group. In 1921, Lawrence M. Judd (then a territorial senator) introduced an American Legion backed bill to require all foreign language publications to provide full translations of their content. Part of a larger movement to "Americanize" Hawaii's large and multi-ethnic immigrant population, the bill would have forced publishers to either expand at a tremendous cost increase or shrink their foreign language section to make room for the translations, and Soga editorialized against it. (The bill was later changed to require translations only from newspapers whose publishers had previously been convicted of violence, intimidation or promoting distrust between groups of people. Soga's 1909 conspiracy conviction, and the law itself once passed, were largely ignored.)

Soon after, the Nippu Jiji became involved in a political controversy regarding the 163 Japanese language schools then operating in Hawaii. The territorial legislature began imposing restrictions on instructor certifications, textbook content, and the amount of time students were allowed to spend at Japanese school in 1920 (after several unsuccessful attempts to pass more restrictive laws in 1918 and 1919). The Federal Commission of Education declared in 1920 that the 20,000 students attending these schools were being "retarded in accepting American customs, manners, ideals, principles, and standards." In April 1923, the territorial legislature enacted the Clark Bill, establishing a per-student tax on the language schools and forcing schools unable to afford the tax to close. Some teachers and parents elected to push back and sued to repeal the restrictions; the Nippu Jiji, drifting away from the leftist stance it took during the sugar strikes, printed articles opposing litigation and urging the community instead to work with the politicians who had drafted the laws.

== World War II and later years ==
Martial law was declared in Hawaii a few hours after the December 7, 1941 attack on Pearl Harbor, and Governor Joseph Poindexter conceded his authority to Commanding General Walter Short. Five days later the Nippu Jiji, along with every other Japanese-language newspaper, was forced to close. Yasutaro Soga and others at the paper were interned. However, the military government soon discovered that without the Japanese newspapers they had no way of communicating with the many Issei who could not read English, and on January 9, 1942, the Nippu Jiji and its main pre-war rival, the Hawaii Hochi, were ordered to reopen and operate under Short's directives. Military supervising staff were assigned by the censorship office, and took over administration of the newspaper and much of the English writing. Existing staff members translated the English articles into Japanese, which were then sent on to FBI or Army linguists for approval before going into print. As part of the military government's policy of pushing for the assimilation and Americanization of the Islands' Japanese American population, both papers were forced to change their names to English titles, and on November 2, 1942, the Nippu Jiji became the Hawaii Times (and would continue to publish under this name until its closure).

With the Hawaii Herald (formerly the Hawaii Hochi) as its only competition during the war, the Times maintained its place in the community as an influential and widely read newspaper, and continued to reach a large audience for years after the war. The paper closed in 1985, and nearly 30,000 photos and documents left behind were claimed by University of Hawaiʻi at Mānoa Professor Dennis M. Ogawa and the Hawaii Times Photo Archives Foundation. The collection is currently being processed for public access.

== See also ==
- Hawaii Hochi
- Japanese in Hawaii
- Oahu Sugar Strike of 1920
- Japanese language education in the United States
