= Masayuki Tokioka =

Japanese businessman and philanthropist (1897–1998)

Masayuki Tokioka (Japanese: 時岡 政幸, May 22, 1897 – August 2, 1998) was a Japanese businessman and philanthropist in Hawaii. He founded the Island Insurance company and City Bank. He helped to build the San Francisco Peace Pagoda, and served on the boards of many non-profit organizations.

== Early life and education ==
Tokioka was born in Okayama, Japan on May 22, 1897. His mother raised him in Japan while his father worked in Hawaii. Tokioka moved to Hawaii in 1909 and attended Kaahumanu Elementary School, where he learned English. Though his parents lived nearby in Waikiki, he boarded at Takie Okumura's "Okumura Home", which was attached to the Makiki Christian Church. He returned home on weekends to help with his father's business.

As he grew older he attended McKinley High School, and graduated in 1921. He then attended the University of Hawaii. In 1925 he earned an MBA from Harvard University, making him the first person of Japanese ancestry to earn one from that institution. He then returned to Hawaii, where he married Harue Fujiyoshi. They had three children.

== Career ==
In 1929 Tokioka helped to found the National Mortgage and Finance Company. He helped many immigrants who were turned away by other institutions because of their race or because they were considered "high risk". Tokioka and Wade Warren Thayer opened Island Insurance in 1940. He later became involved in many other businesses such as the Newfair Dairy, International Savings & Loan Association, and National Securities and Investments Inc.

Tokioka was a member of the Honolulu Japanese Chamber of Commerce for many years and served as the president in 1953. He was also the president of the Honolulu Lions Club. He served on the board of the Crown Prince Akihito Scholarship Foundation and the Kuakini Medical Center. He helped to build the San Francisco Peace Pagoda in 1968, and the Japanese Cultural Center of Hawaii in 1987. During the 1970s he worked to raise funds to build a center for immigration history at the Bishop Museum.

Throughout his life he was given several awards including an Award of Merit in 1961 by the San Francisco Chamber of Commerce, and an honorary doctorate from the University of Hawaii in 1982.

Tokioka died on August 2, 1998. The Island Insurance Company created the Masayuki Tokioka Excellence in School Leadership scholarship in his honor. It is awarded to a public school principal every year.

== See also ==
- Lawrence Takeo Kagawa
