= Japanese in Hawaii =

Kepanī ケパニ
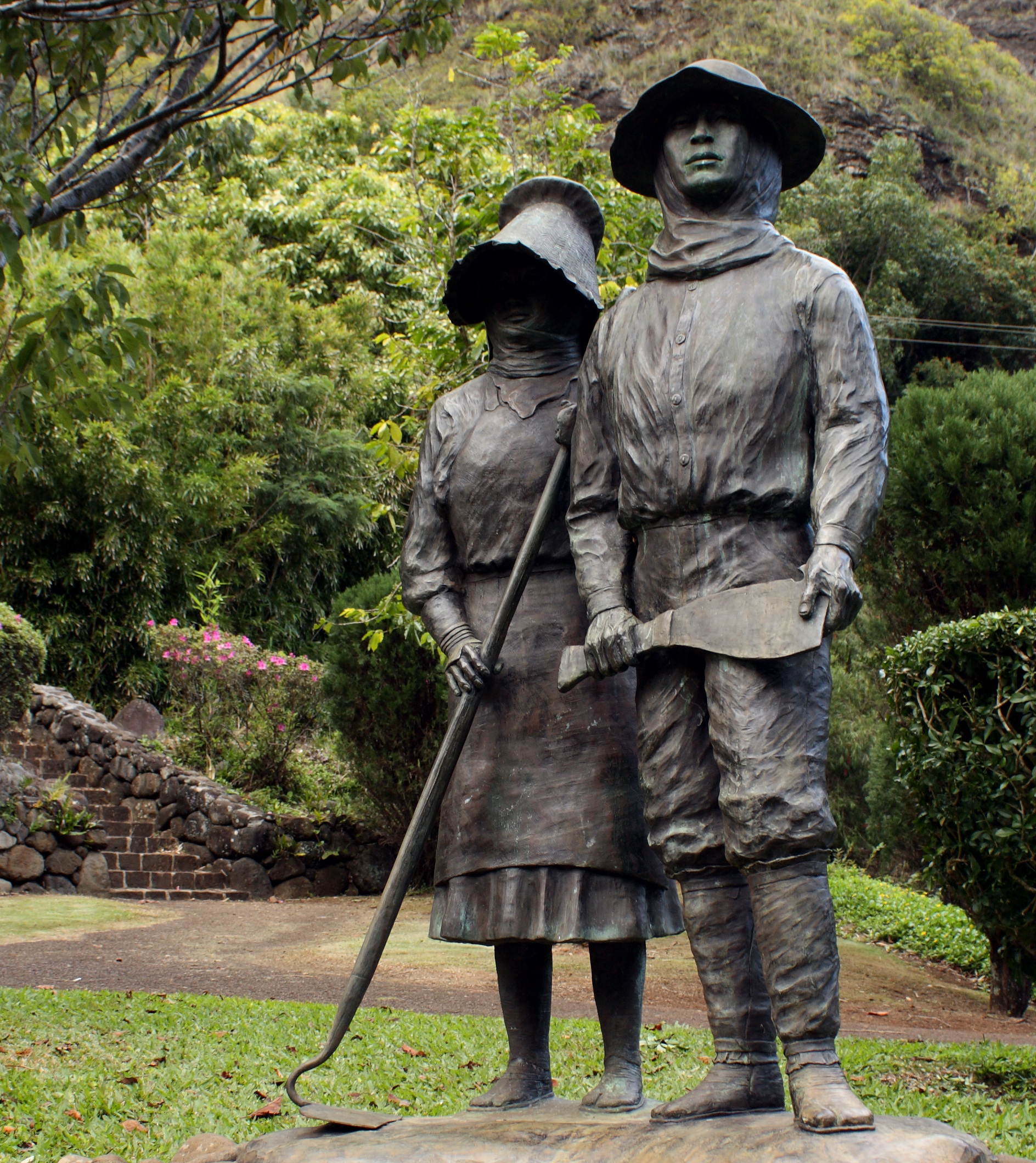
- Bronze statue of Japanese sugarcane workers erected in 1985 on the centennial anniversary of the first Japanese immigration to Hawaii in 1885.

Total population
- 312,668 (2020)

Languages
- English; Japanese; Okinawan; Hawaiian; Hawaiian Pidgin

Religion
- Buddhism; Christianity; Shintoism; Irreligion

Related ethnic groups
- Japanese American; Japanese people; Okinawans in Hawaii; Ryukyuan people

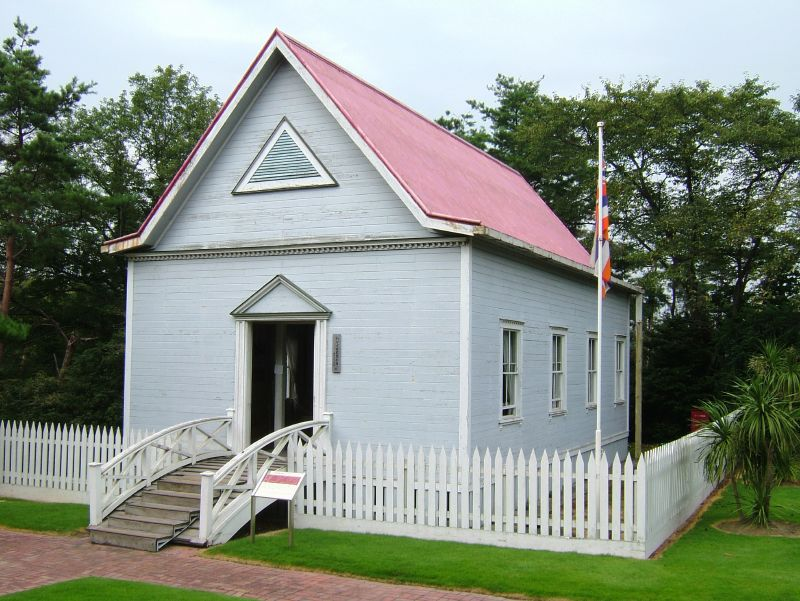
Japanese Immigrant's Assembly Hall in Hilo, built in 1889, today located in Meiji Mura museum, Japan

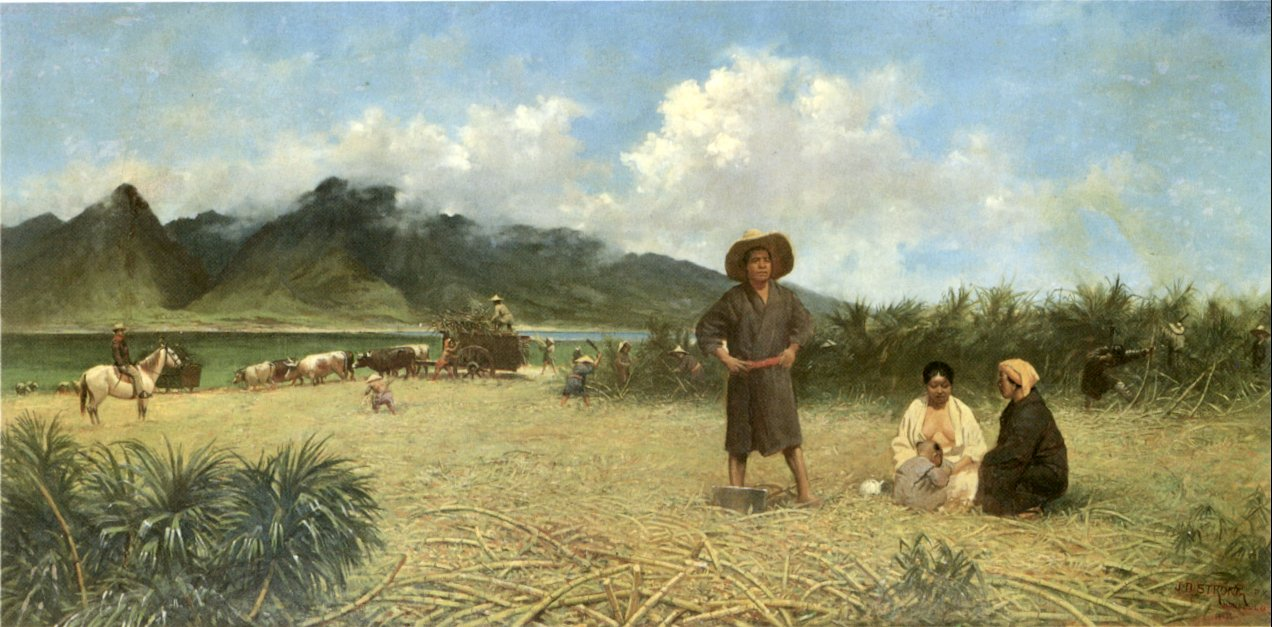
"Japanese Laborers on Spreckelsville Plantation", oil on canvas painting by Joseph Dwight Strong, 1885, private collection

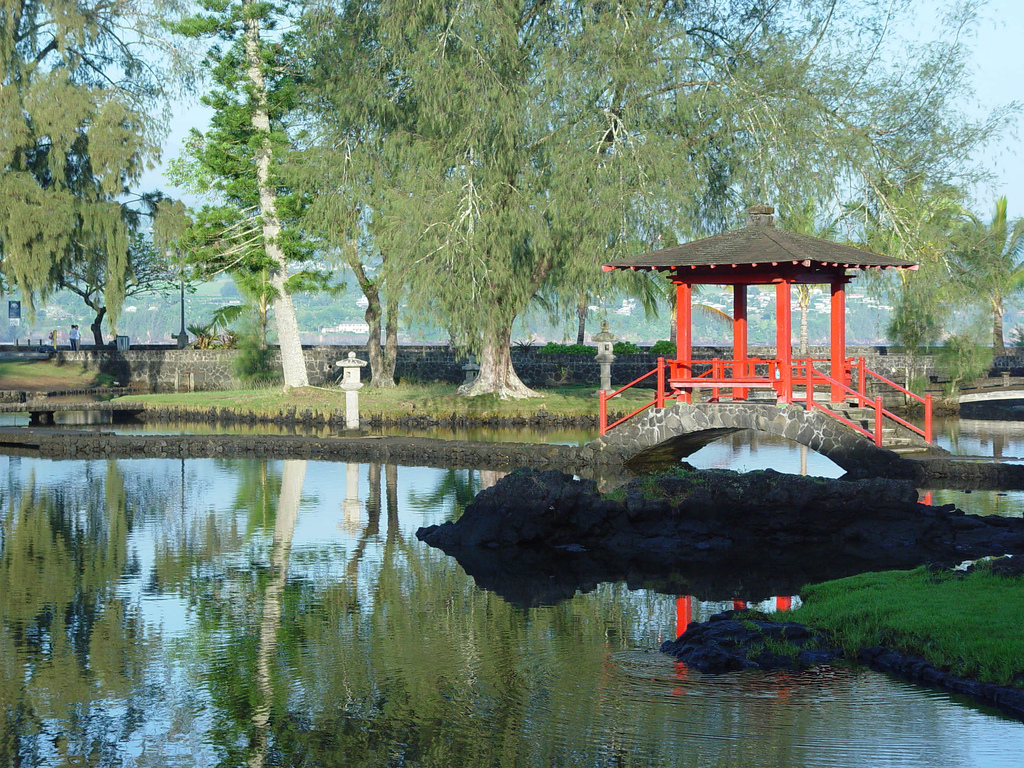
Liliuokalani Park and Gardens, built in the early 1900s

The Japanese in Hawaii (simply Japanese Hawaiians or "Local Japanese", rarely in Hawaiian: Kepanī) are the second largest ethnic group in Hawaii. At their height in 1920, they constituted 43% of Hawaii's population. They now number about 21.5% of the islands' population, according to the 2020 U.S. census: the figure includes mixed-race and mixed-ethnicity individuals.

== History ==
=== Final voyage of the Inawaka-maru ===
The earliest known Japanese people in the Kingdom of Hawaii were the survivors of the ill-fated ship Inawaka-maru, who arrived on May 5, 1806. They had been adrift aboard their disabled ship for more than 70 days.

The Inawaka-maru, a small cargo ship built in 1798 in Osaka, was owned by Mansuke Motoya. The Inawaka-maru started its final voyage from Hiroshima to Edo (modern Tokyo) on November 7, 1805. The ship had been chartered by the Kikkawa clan to deliver mats, horse feed, and two passengers, Kikkawa officials. Her crew consisted of Captain Niinaya Ginzo, Master Ichiko Sadagoro, Sailors Hirahara Zenmatsu, Akazaki Matsujiro, Yumori Kasoji, and Wasazo, a total of eight aboard. The Inawaka-maru had to turn back, and restarted her journey on November 27. She arrived in Edo on December 21, started back to her home port stopping in Kanagawa, Uraga, and Shimoda, and left on her final leg – from Shimoda across the Enshū Sea – on January 6, 1806.

The Inawaka-maru was caught by a snowstorm that turned to rain and winds battered the ship eastward into the Pacific Ocean. On January 7, the crew cut down the mast because of the strong winds. Four days later, two rocky islands were sighted but no attempt was made toward them. These would be the last land before the Hawaiian Islands. On January 20, the water stores were empty, but the men collected rainwater to survive. On February 28, the rice provisions ran out. A few weeks later on March 15, a flying fish landed in the ship and the men fished to sustain themselves. On March 20, the Tabour, an American ship Captained by Cornelius Sole, rescued the men of the Inawaka-maru. He found them begging for food by gesturing to their stomachs, mouths and bowing, found the galley empty, and understood their ordeal. He had the possessions of the survivors brought aboard his ship and salvaged parts and items aboard Inawaka-maru. Captain Sole had the survivors fed, over a span of five days, small portions to a progression to three normal meals a day, the remedy for starvation. On May 5, 1806, the Tabour docked in Oahu, Hawaii. Captain Sole left the eight Japanese in the care of King Kamehameha I. Captain Sole also left the anchor of the Inawaka-maru, 40 axes, and other items as payment for the Kingdom's hospitality.

The King delegated the responsibility for the Japanese to Kalanimoku who had 50 men construct a house on May 6 for the Japanese. It took four days to build, and a cook and two guards assigned to the house, which attracted crowds to these men of a different ethnicity. On August 17, the Japanese left Hawaii aboard the Perseverance to Macau on October 17. From there they took a Chinese ship to Jakarta on December 25. In Jakarta, they fell ill and five died there or on the voyage to Nagasaki where they arrived on June 17, 1807, where another died. At the time of the Sakoku it was illegal to leave Japan and the remaining two survivors were jailed and interrogated. One committed suicide and the remaining survivor Hirahara Zenmatsu eventually made it home November 29, 1807, but was summoned by Asano Narikata, The Daimyō of Hiroshima, to recount his odyssey of an experience titled Iban Hyoryu Kikokuroku Zenmatsu (夷蛮漂流歸國録善松). Hirahara Zenmatsu died six months later.

=== Gannenmono ===
In 1866, Eugene Miller Van Reed, a Dutch American, went to Japan as a representative of the Hawaiian Kingdom. He failed to establish a formal Hawaii-Japan relationship, but continued to stay there as a merchant and obtained a permission of Japanese emigration from the Edo Shogunate. As he started recruiting, the new Meiji Government that came into power in 1867, the first year of the Meiji period, nullified all the Edo Shogunate's treaties. (One of the reasons of the new government's rejection is said to be the rumor that Van Reed was engaged in slave trade. For example, Korekiyo Takahashi, whose study in the U.S. was arranged by Van Reed, ended up being sold by the host family as a slave, but managed to get back to Japan and eventually became the 20th Prime Minister.) However, Van Reed proceeded without the new government's permission to send 153 Japanese to Hawaii to work on the sugar plantations. They sailed from Yokohama to Honolulu from May 17 to June 19, 1868, on the Scioto. This first official group of Japanese immigrants were called the Gannenmono (Japanese: 元年者), meaning the "people of the first year (of the Meiji period)", and the 150th anniversary of their arrival was celebrated in Hawaii in 2018.

There were 142 men and six women in this initial group, and so many of them married Hawaiians after they arrived in Hawaii. They worked on sugar plantations on Oahu, Maui, Kauai, and Lanai. Two or three months after arriving, many complained of contract violations since the working conditions and pay did not match with what they were promised. At least four of the six women and 50 men returned to Japan in 1870. Seven had died before their contracts ended. Among the Gannenmono were several people who would become legends among the Japanese Americans in Hawaii: Tomitarō Makino from Miyagi, the leader of the group; the youngest Ichigorō Ishimura, 13 years old; Sentarō Ishii, a samurai from Okayama, who was 102 years old when he died in Maui; Tokujirō "Toko" Satō from Tokyo, who lived in Waipio Valley with his Hawaiian wife, Clara; and Tarō Andō, who would become Japan's first consul general to the Kingdom of Hawaii.

=== Subsequent immigration ===
Between 1869 and 1885, Japan barred emigration to Hawaii in fear that Japanese laborers would be degrading to the reputation of the Japanese race.

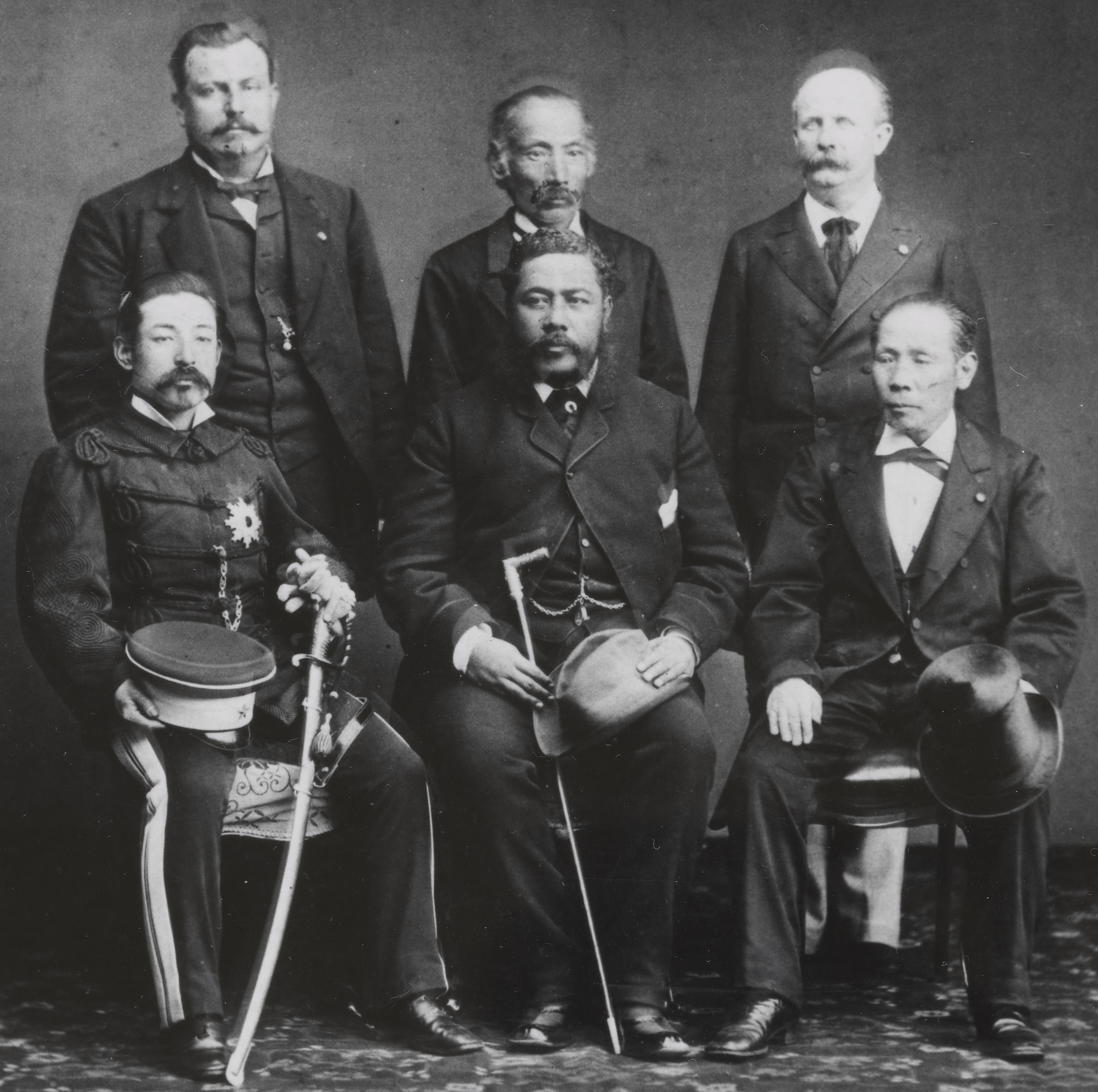
King Kalākaua sitting center flanked by Prince Higashifushimi Yoshiaki (left) and Japanese Minister of Finance Sano Tsunetani (right) taken during the Hawaiian royal visit in 1881; behind them L-R: Col. Charles Hastings Judd, Japanese Fin. Min. Printing Bureau Director Tokuno Ryosuke, and William N. Armstrong.

In 1881, King David Kalākaua visited Japan to strengthen relations between the two nations. Kalākaua offered not to request extraterritoriality of Japan, an act that departed from the norm of western nations. On March 10, Kalakaua met Emperor Meiji to propose a marriage between Princess Victoria Kaiulani and Prince Higashifushimi Yorihito. A few days later, the proposal was denied, but the ban on immigration was eventually lifted in 1885. The first Japanese immigrants after the lifting of the ban arrived in Hawaii on February 8, 1885, as contract laborers for the sugarcane and pineapple plantations. Many more Japanese immigrants came to Hawaii in the following years. Most of these migrants came from southern Japan (Hiroshima, Yamaguchi, Kumamoto, etc.) due to crop failures in the region.

=== Okinawan immigration ===
In 1900, the first group of Okinawan laborers arrived in Hawaii after Japan lifted its emigration ban on Okinawa Prefecture. These laborers were helped by Kyuzo Toyama, who is considered to be the "father of Okinawan emigration". Kyuzo Toyama himself led the second group of Okinawans, who arrived in 1903. By 1920, nearly 20,000 Okinawans and their descendants lived in Hawaii. Today, Okinawans in Hawaii form a distinct community from the Japanese in Hawaii due to cultural and linguistic differences.

=== Annexation of Hawaii by the United States ===
The political environment shifted with the onset of a new era known as the Hawaiian Revolutions. In 1887, the settlers ended absolute rule by the king by forcing him to accept the Bayonet Constitution and agreeing to constitutional government with a powerful parliament. The new constitution gave voting rights only for Hawaiians, Americans, and Europeans, and thus denied rights for Japanese and other Asians. The Japanese commissioner worked to pressure the Kingdom to restore the rights of Japanese by amending the constitution. In 1893, the Hawaiian Monarchy was overthrown, Tokyo responded by appointing Captain Tōgō Heihachirō to command the Japanese naval activities in Hawaii. The Naniwa was sent immediately to Hawaii to rendezvous with the Kongō which had been on a training mission.

Captain Tōgō had previously been a guest of Kalākaua, and returned to Hawaii to denounce the overthrow of Queen Lydia Liliʻuokalani, sister and successor to the late king and conduct “gunboat diplomacy”. Tōgō refused to salute the Provisional Government by not flying the flag of the Republic. He refused to recognize the new regime, encouraged the British ship HMS Garnet to do the same and protested the overthrow. The Japanese commissioner eventually stopped Tōgō from continuing his protest, believing it would undo his work at restoring rights to Japanese. Katō Kanji wrote in hindsight that he had regretted they had not protested harder and should have recruited the British in the protest.

The continued presence of the Japanese Navy and Japan's opposition to the overthrow led to a concern that Japan might use military force to restore Liliʻuokalani to her throne as a Japanese puppet. Anti-Japanese sentiment heightened.

After April 30, 1900, all children born in Hawaii were American citizens at birth. (8 U.S.C. § 1405) Most of the Japanese children had dual citizenship after their parents registered them. The Japanese settlers set up the first Japanese schools in the United States. By 1920, 98% of all Japanese children in Hawaii attended Japanese schools. Statistics for 1934 showed 183 schools taught a total of 41,192 students. Today, Japanese schools in Hawaii operate as supplementary education (usually on Friday nights or Saturday mornings) which is on top of the compulsory education required by the state.

Today, where Nikkei are about one-fifth of the whole population, Japanese is a major language, spoken and studied by many of the state's residents across ethnicities. It is taught in private Japanese-language schools as early as the second grade. The Hawaii media market has a few locally produced Japanese-language newspapers and magazines; however, these are on the verge of dying out, due to a lack of interest on the part of the local (Hawaii-born) Japanese population. Stores that cater to the tourist industry often have Japanese-speaking personnel. To show their allegiance to the U.S., many Nisei and Sansei intentionally avoided learning Japanese.

=== Japanese tourism in Hawaii ===
Hawaii was an attractive dream destination to Japanese people for over a century, but the tourism boom began in 1964. As Japan opened for travel abroad, huge numbers of Japanese citizens began visiting Hawaii. Due to the large percentage of people of Japanese descent living there, it provides familiar comfort while retaining the image of a foreign paradise. The concept of amae describes the feeling of safety and dependence on others present in the Japanese tourists' image of Hawaii. In addition to the familiarity of sharing Japanese heritage, as a courtesy to the large number of Japanese tourists, Japanese subtexts are provided on place signs, public transportation, and civic facilities.

Visitors from Japan make up such a large portion of tourists in Hawaii that at its highest point, Japanese tourists constituted up to one third of the total visitors. Japanese tourists also tend to spend more than other tourists, such as those from the mainland United States. They are often returning visitors, and the Japanese concept of omiyage presents a social expectation to purchase and bring back gifts from traveling. Overall, Japanese tourists are an important segment of Hawaii's tourism industry, which makes up 21% of the state's economy.

== Education ==
The teaching of the Japanese language in Hawaiian public schools began formally in February 1960, at the elementary school level. This was made possible due to funding from the United States government under the 1958 National Defense Act.

In 1962, there were 83 educational institutions in Hawaii which taught Japanese. There is a supplementary Japanese school with recognition from the Japanese Ministry of Education, Culture, Sports, Science and Technology (MEXT), The Hawaii Japanese School – Rainbow Gakuen (ハワイレインボー学園 Hawai Rainbō Gakuen) in Honolulu. This school caters to families with Japanese citizenship. It was first established in 1974.

== Notable people ==
- Sanji Abe
- Bumpei Akaji
- Bernard Akana
- Earl I. Anzai
- Alan Arakawa
- George Ariyoshi
- Robert Kiyosaki
- Jean Ariyoshi
- Karen Awana
- Tadao Beppu
- Keiko Bonk
- Tom Brower
- Clarissa Chun
- Destin Daniel Cretton
- Kawika Crowley
- Nelson Doi
- Robert Fukuda
- Beth Fukumoto
- Carol Fukunaga
- Katsu Goto
- Colleen Hanabusa
- Troy Hashimoto
- Yu Hayami
- Guy Kawasaki
- Harvey Saburo Hayashi
- Juggie Heen
- Ryan Higa
- Mazie Hirono
- Linda Ichiyama
- Dan Ige
- David Ige
- Les Ihara Jr.
- Carrie Ann Inaba
- Kaniela Ing
- Egan Inoue
- Enson Inoue
- Daniel Inouye
- Ken Ito
- Kim Coco Iwamoto
- Randy Iwase
- Jon Karamatsu
- Derek Kawakami
- Richard Kawakami
- Michelle Kidani
- Jean King
- Chinyei Kinjo
- Ann Kobayashi
- Bertrand Kobayashi
- Sanzaburo Kobayashi
- Russell S. Kokubun
- Sam Saturo Kong
- Roland Kotani
- Ron Kouchi
- Clyde Kusatsu
- Sanoe Lake
- Fred Kinzaburo Makino
- Barbara Marumoto
- Herbert Matayoshi
- Spark Matsunaga
- Patsy Mink
- John Mizuno
- Iga Mori
- Ishiko Mori
- Motokazu Mori
- Hermina Morita
- Tetsuo Najita
- Keo Nakama
- Mark Nakashima
- Clarence Nishihara
- Scott Nishimoto
- Steere Noda
- Takashi Ohno
- Richard Onishi
- Ellison Onizuka
- Blake Oshiro
- Marcus Oshiro
- Paul Osumi
- Evelyn Rawski
- Pat Saiki
- Scott Saiki
- Thomas Sakakihara
- Shunzo Sakamaki
- Norman Sakamoto
- James Shigeta
- Maile Shimabukuro
- Louis Smolka
- Mark Takai
- Dwight Takamine
- Yoshito Takamine
- Gregg Takayama
- Roy Takumi
- Brian Taniguchi
- Larry Tanimoto
- Akebono Tarō
- Charmaine Tavares
- Chris Toshiro Todd
- James Tokioka
- Jill Tokuda
- Clift Tsuji
- Wilfred Tsukiyama
- Shan Tsutsui
- Shane Victorino
- Lynne Waihee
- Glenn Wakai
- Ryan Yamane
- Stephen K. Yamashiro
- Kyle Yamashita
- Nadao Yoshinaga
- Keone Young

== See also ==
- Byodo-In Temple (non-denominational)
- Honpa Hongwanji Mission of Hawaii (Jodo Shinshu)
- Daifukuji Soto Zen Mission (Zen Buddhism)
- Hawaii Shingon Mission (Shingon Buddhism)
- Jodo Mission of Hawaii (Jodo Shu)
- Japanese American internment
- Nisei Japanese American
- Issei Japanese American
- Ryukyuans (including Okinawans)
- Chinese immigration to Hawaii
- Korean immigration to Hawaii
- Filipinos in Hawaii
- Asian immigration to Hawaii
- Puerto Rican immigration to Hawaii
- Okinawans in Hawaii
