= Hawaii United Okinawa Association =

Cultural organization

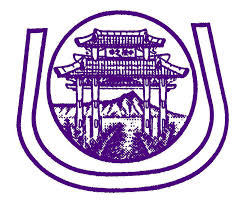
- Logo of the Hawaii United Okinawa Association
- Abbreviation: HUOA
- Formation: 1951
- Location: Hawaii, United States
- Coordinates: 21.4204045°N 158.0059136°W
- Members: 40,000+
- Website: https://huoa.org/

The Hawaii United Okinawa Association (HUOA, Japanese: ハワイ沖縄連合会, Hawai Okinawa Rengō-kai) is a cultural organization for the Okinawan community of Hawaii.

== History ==
The HUOA was founded in 1951 under the name "United Okinawan Association of Hawaii" and was renamed to its current title in 1995.

As a result of World War II, Okinawa was severely damaged, with much of its infrastructure and a third of its population perishing. To help with Okinawa's post-war recovery, the HUOA sent clothing, livestock and other essentials to the island, including 550 pigs. When the United States military occupied Okinawa, the HUOA was recognized as the official representative of the Hawaii Okinawans. This allowed it to host official visitors from Okinawa and to participate in numerous government-sponsored programs.

== Membership and activities ==
The HUOA's membership count is 40,000, a similar number to the total amount of Hawaii residents of Okinawan ancestry (45,000-50,000). The organization comprises over 50 member clubs, each representing a town in Okinawa.

The HUOA holds the Okinawan Festival annually since 1982. The Okinawan Festival is considered to be the largest ethnic festival in Hawaii, featuring Okinawan music, dances and other cultural practices. The 38th festival was cancelled because of the coronavirus pandemic, but was later hosted virtually in early September. In addition to festivals, the HUOA hosts parades and other cultural events. Individual clubs also plan activities for its members.

== See also ==
- Japanese Cultural Center of Hawaii
- Nisei Veterans Memorial Center
- Okinawans in Hawaii
- Ryukyuan diaspora
- Japanese in Hawaii
