= Pali Momi Medical Center =

Coordinates: 21.3833°N 157.9383°W

Geography
- Location: Aiea, Oahu, Hawaii, United States

Organization
- Care system: Community
- Type: Non-profit
- Network: Hawaii Pacific Health

Services
- Emergency department: Yes
- Beds: 126

History
- Founded: 1989

Links
- Website: Official website
- Lists: Hospitals in Hawaii

Pali Momi Medical Center is a nonprofit hospital located in Aiea, West Oʻahu. It has 118 beds, and has a full range of services, including an interventional cardiac catheterization lab, CT scan and MRI services, and the state's first Retina Center. Pali Momi's emergency services division employs a team triage method, and is the only hospital in Hawaii to do so. It also has a simulation lab to further train their staff.

Pali Momi was founded in 1989 as the Kapiolani Medical Center at Pali Momi. It is an affiliate of Hawaiʻi Pacific Health. In 2010, the hospital rebranded itself as the Pali Momi Medical Center.

== See also ==
- Kapiolani Medical Center for Women and Children
- Straub Clinic & Hospital
- Wilcox Memorial Hospital
