= Lawrence Takeo Kagawa =

Lawrence Takeo (L.T.) Kagawa (香川ローレンス武雄, October 19, 1903–July 31, 1973) was a Japanese American businessman.

== Biography ==
Kagawa was born in Lahaina, Maui in 1903. He studied in Japan for three years. He began working for an insurance company in Honolulu in the 1930s. At the time, minorities paid higher premiums and had access to fewer types of insurance than white people. Kagawa worked to offer insurance at the same rate to everyone, and started the Occidental Underwriters of Hawaii in 1933. He also worked with Kazuaki Tanaka, Shigeru Horita, and Eiichi Kishida to start a department store in Honolulu in 1940. However, the department store was closed in 1942 after it was seized by the American government. All four men were incarcerated for the duration of World War II. Kagawa was moved between several camps, including Angel Island, Camp McCoy, Camp Forrest, Camp Livingston, and Jerome Relocation Center, where he was reunited with his family. The family then relocated to Des Moines in November 1943.

After the war, the family returned to Hawaii. Kagawa registered his company to operate in Japan, where he sold life insurance to Americans living there. He also founded Central Pacific Bank alongside Koichi Iida. In 1972 he was awarded the Order of the Rising Sun, Third Class. Kagawa died on July 31, 1973, at Kuakini Hospital.

== See also ==
- Masayuki Tokioka
