= Asian immigration to Hawaii =

Total population
- 531,000

Languages
- English, Hawaiian Pidgin, Chinese, Tagalog, Korean, Japanese, Ilokano, Hindi, Vietnamese, Thai, other Languages of Asia

Religion
- Protestantism, Catholicism, Buddhism, Hinduism, Islam, Sikhism, Irreligion, Others

Related ethnic groups
- Asian Americans

Most early Asian settlers to the United States, particularly the Japanese, went to Hawaii. Most of these early immigrants moved to the islands as laborers to work on the pineapple, coconut, and sugarcane plantations. These early migrants have tended to stay, although a handful returned to their home countries. Most people in Hawaii of Asian ancestry/origin are Filipino, Japanese, or Chinese. There has also been recent immigration to Hawaii from more ethnic Asian groups, including Thai, Indian, Indonesian, and Vietnamese.

== Chinese ==
The Chinese were the first Asian people to ever inhabit Hawaii. The earliest Chinese arrived in the Hawaiian Islands in 1778, the same year as English explorer James Cook. Today, some Chinese born on the islands can claim to be seventh generation. Although the Chinese are only the fifth most populous ethnic group in Hawaii, it is estimated that a third of Hawaii's entire population has some Chinese ancestry. This is due to historically high rates of intermarriage among the early immigrant Chinese men with native Hawaiian women and immigrant women of other ethnicities, such as Portuguese.

== Japanese ==
The majority of early Japanese immigrants were male, but unlike the Chinese men, Japanese men largely avoided intermarriage with women of other ethnic groups by importing Japanese women to Hawaii as picture brides. The high endogamy, immigration, and fertility rates of the Japanese quickly allowed them to form the plurality of Hawaii's population starting from the late 1800s. After the breakout of World War II, more than 110,000 Japanese Americans in the mainland U.S., who mostly lived on the West Coast, were forced into internment camps. However, in Hawai'i, where 150,000-plus Japanese Americans composed over one-third of the population, only 1,200 to 1,800 were interned. The Japanese remained the most populous ethnic group of Hawaii until 2010, when they were overtaken by Filipinos.

== Filipinos ==
Filipinos, like most other Southeast Asian immigrants to Hawaii, worked on the sugar plantations. In 2010, Filipinos surpassed Japanese as the largest ethnic group. At the time of the 2000 census, they were the third largest ethnic group in the islands.

85% of Filipinos in Hawaii trace their ancestry to the Ilocos Region of northern Luzon.

== Korean ==
Koreans mainly came to the islands to work on the pineapple and sugar plantations, but a few, including the family of Mary Paik Lee, came to the mainland (usually California) after experiencing extreme discrimination.

== Indians ==
People of Indian origin did not come to Hawaii in sizable numbers, and those who did not stay for long. Many early Indian immigrants stopped in Hawaii only to make enough money to sail on to the mainland anywhere from the mid to late 1800s to the 1900s.

A notable Indian in Hawaii was Dalip Singh Saund, who on September 13, 1910, arrived in Honolulu from his home village in Punjab, India at the age of 14. He labored in the sugarcane fields for about two months to earn enough money to continue on to California. On November 18, 1910, he arrived on Angel Island. At one point, Saund was the nation's largest celery grower.

== Okinawans ==
When Japan annexed Okinawa (formerly known as the Ryukyu Kingdom), the Okinawan economy started to decline. As a result, there was a growing demand for the Japanese government to allow Okinawans to migrate elsewhere. The first of these Okinawans came to Hawaii in 1899 under the supervision of Kyuzo Toyama, who is known as the "father of Okinawan emigration".

Okinawans in Hawaii tend to view themselves as a distinct group from the Japanese in Hawaii. The Center for Okinawan Studies at the University of Hawaiʻi (Mānoa) estimates that the Okinawan community numbers anywhere between 45,000 and 50,000 people, or 3% of Hawaii's population.

== Living Conditions of Asian Immigrants ==
The massive influx of Asian American immigrants shifted the demographic dynamic of Hawaii to a majority Asian community. Asian immigrants of all kinds, including Native Hawaiians, often came over as laborers and were subject to harsh working conditions in sugar plantations - 10 hour workdays, relentless lunas, and squalid working conditions.

Importantly, the proliferation of sugar plantations in Hawaii were owned and operated by white Americans, bringing over ideologies of white supremacy and colonialism with them. This laid the groundwork for the racial hierarchy where both Native Hawaiians and Asian immigrants were treated as disposable cheap labor. Racially discriminatory wage control and fines were instituted by the white plantation owners in order to maintain control over the ever-diversifying ethnic demographic of Hawaii.

Despite these challenges the Asian laborers faced, many of the farm laborers banded together through strikes and multi-ethnic unions. Japanese, Filipino, Spanish, Portuguese, and Chinese workers had made the Hawaii Laborers' Association - a multi-ethnic union that fought for workers' rights while also fostering a multi-ethnic camaraderie.

== Settler Colonialism ==
Settler colonialism refers to the idea that, instead of typical colonialism where an external nation is extracting wealth from an area, settler colonialism is where the colonizers actually migrate to the land of the colonized. These settlers then ultimately become the majority population and slowly push out the indigenous populations from control of their own land.

An often overlooked aspect of this increased Asian immigration to Hawaii as cheap plantation laborers is the social, economic, and political effect of the shifting demographic on Native Hawaiians. Settler colonialism in Hawaii is a unique case compared to others historically because of the Asian ancestry (Polynesian) of the indigenous Hawaiians. As such, there was a two-fold effect of settler colonialism on the indigenous population: on top of the white plantation owners acting as colonists, the Asian settlers also acted as colonists via their surging immigration counts pushing the indigenous Hawaiians to the fringe socially, economically, and politically.

White plantation owners would lump the Asian immigrants and indigenous Hawaiians together in terms of their racially discriminatory policies, while Asian immigrants implicitly participated in the marginalization of Native Hawaiians. Ultimately, these native Hawaiian populations became a minority in their own land, as they lost the rights to their land and lost political influence to the large plantation companies and large immigrant population.

== See also ==
- Indian American - the same ethnic group, but this also includes other areas of the United States.
- Filipino American - the same ethnic group, but this also includes other areas of the United States.
- Japanese American - the same ethnic group, but this also includes other areas of the United States.
- Korean American - the same ethnic group, but this also includes other areas of the United States.
- Chinese American - the same ethnic group, but this also includes other areas of the United States.
- Ryukyuan American (Okinawan American) - the same ethnic group, but this also includes other areas of the United States.
- Asian American - the immigration of all the people of the continent of Asia to the United States.
- Asian Canadian - the immigration of all the people of the continent of Asia to Canada.
- Asian Pacific American - a category that applies both to Pacific Islander American, and Asian Americans.
- Asian Latin American - the immigration of all the people of the continent of Asia to Central America, South America, and Mexico.
- Indians in Fiji - the importation of Indians to the Fiji Islands to labor on its sugar plantations.
- Filipino immigration to Mexico - the immigration of Filipinos to the country of Mexico.
- Chinese immigration to Puerto Rico - the immigration of the Chinese to the present day U.S. territory of Puerto Rico.

== Bibliography ==
- Fry, Kathie. "Chinese Immigration to Hawaii" (reprint). Hawaii for Visitors.
- Chang, Roberta; Wayne Patterson (2003). The Koreans in Hawaiʻi: A Pictorial History 1903-2003. University of Hawaii Press. ISBN 0-8248-2664-7.
- McKeown, Adam (2001). Chinese Migrant Networks and Cultural Change: Peru, Chicago, Hawaii, 1900-1936. University of Chicago Press. ISBN 978-0-226-56024-3.
- Gutierrez, Ben (2011). "Filipinos Now Second-Largest Racial Group in Hawaii" (reprint). Hawaii News Now.
- Samra Family. "From Punjab, India to Angel Island" (reprint). Angel Island Immigration Station Foundation.
- Takaki, Ronald T and Rebecca Stefoff. Raising Cane: The World of Plantation Hawaii (Asian American Experience) (1993)
- Tamura, Eileen H. "Using the Past to Inform the Future: An Historiography of Hawaii's Asian and Pacific Islander Americans", Amerasia Journal, (2000), 26#1, pp 55–85
