= Iida =

Iida or IIDA may refer to:

- Iida, Nagano, Japan
- Iida (surname)
- International Interior Design Association, a professional networking and educational association committed to interior design
