= Nanori =

Kanji character readings used in Japanese names

Nanori (Japanese: 名乗り; "to say or give one's own name") are the often non-standard kanji character readings (pronunciations) found almost exclusively in Japanese names.

In the Japanese language, many Japanese names are constructed from common characters with standard pronunciations. However, names may also contain rare characters which only occur as parts of names, or use non-standard readings of common characters. Often, the readings used are so esoteric that they cannot even be found in dictionaries. For example, the character 希, meaning "hope" or "rare", has standard pronunciations ki (キ), ke (ケ), and mare (まれ). However, as a female name, it can be pronounced Nozomi.

In compounds, nanori readings can be used in conjunction with other readings, such as in the name Iida (飯田). Here, 飯, a character meaning 'meal', is normally read as either meshi (めし) or han (ハン), but in the context of this name the special nanori reading ii (いい) is used instead. The second character 田 is read using its standard kun'yomi reading, da (だ). Often (as in the previous example), the nanori reading is related to the general meaning of the kanji, as it is frequently an old-fashioned way to read the character that has since fallen into disuse.

== See also ==
- On'yomi, readings of kanji based on Chinese pronunciation
- Kun'yomi, readings of kanji based on Japanese pronunciation
