= Nisei Veterans Memorial Center =

Memorial and community center in Maui, Hawaii

Coordinates: 20.901321°N 156.482685°W

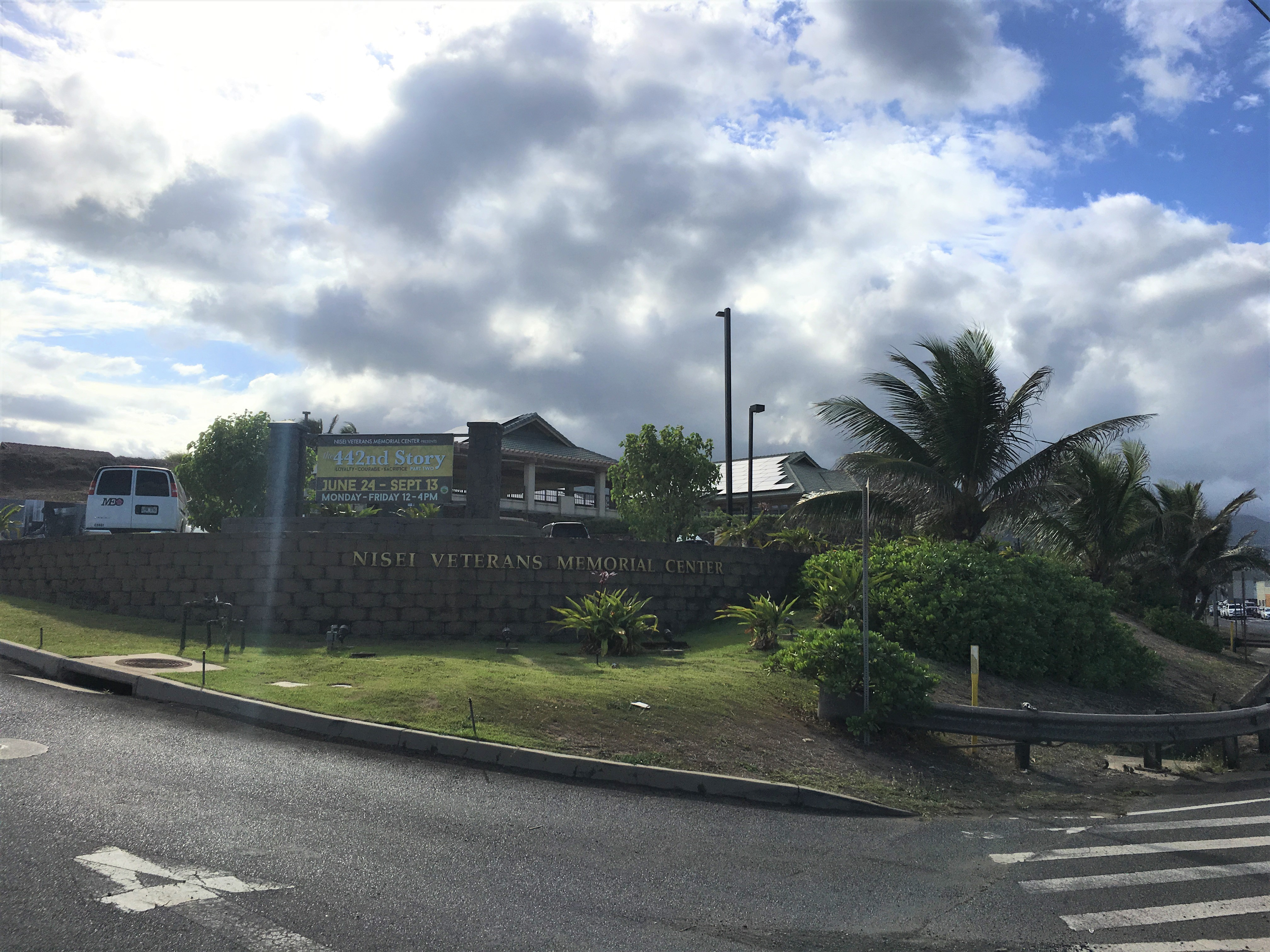
Nisei Veterans Memorial Center, September 2019

The Nisei Veterans Memorial Center (Japanese: 二世退役軍人記念センター, Nisei Taiekigunjin Kinen Sentā) is a non-profit organization, memorial, and community center, dedicated to Japanese American nisei veterans. It is located on Kahului, Hawaii and features educational exhibits, a preschool, and an adult daycare. The main building was built in 2006.

== History ==
The organization was incorporated in 1991. During 2003, the Maui Sons and Daughters of Nisei veterans completed plans and research into the construction of the center, which would consist of a preschool, a senior day-care center, and a research center/archive.

== Wings ==
=== Kansha Preschool ===
The center includes a pre-school, and they enroll up to 16 children. Children interact daily with the elderly at the adult-day care center that they share a facility with.

=== Adult day-care center ===
The Nisei Veterans Memorial Center includes the Oceanview branch of the Maui Adult Day Care Centers.

=== Education center ===
The education center began construction on 29 June 2009. It opened in 2013, and contains a classroom, a pavilion, and an archive containing "oral histories from the veterans ... photographs, documents, and personal scrapbooks". It will consist of two floors of 2,100 square feet (200 m^{2}).

== See also ==
- Japanese Cultural Center of Hawaii
- Hawaii United Okinawa Association
- Japanese in Hawaii
