= Motokazu =

- Gender: Male

Origin
- Origin: Japanese
- Meaning: Different meanings depending on the kanji used

Motokazu (written: 元一) is a masculine Japanese given name. The name is derived from a combination of kanji characters, typically moto (元), meaning "origin" or "source," and kazu (和), meaning "harmony" or "peace".

Historically, the surname's distribution was influenced by migration patterns during the Edo period, resulting in its presence across various regions of Japan.

Notable people with the name include:

== People ==
- Motokazu Mori (毛利 元一; 1890–1958), Japanese surgeon and poet
- Motoichi Kumagai (熊谷 元一; 1909–2010), Japanese photographer and illustrator, sometimes referred to as Motokazu Kumagai
