= Tokioka =

Tokioka (Japanese: 時岡) is a Japanese surname. It may refer to:

- Hiromasa Tokioka (born 1974), a former Japanese football player
- James Tokioka, an American politician and a Democratic member of the Hawaii House of Representatives since January 2007
- Masayuki Tokioka (1897–1998), a Japanese businessman
- Takasi Tokioka (1913–2001), a Japanese zoologist specialist of marine animals
