= Koichi Iida =

Japanese american businessman from Hawaiʻi

Koichi Iida (飯田 鴻一) (May 20, 1888 – November 8, 1973) was a Japanese American businessman from Hawaiʻi. He is best known for founding Central Pacific Bank.

== Early life and education ==
Iida was born on May 20, 1888, in Osaka, son of Matsukichi Iida, who moved to Honolulu in 1895.

In 1906 Koichi Iida graduated from Osaka Commercial School. He then moved to Los Angeles, where he studied English. Five years later he moved to Hawaiʻi and joined his father in running the business. Matsukichi returned to Japan in 1931, leaving the business to Koichi.

== Career ==
Iida was a founding member of the Honolulu Japanese Traders Union, and was elected president in 1928. When the Union merged with the Honolulu Japanese Chamber of Commerce, he became its president in 1940. In the meantime his business continued to grow until he was incarcerated in several internment camps on the continent during World war II. He was incarcerated for the duration of the war, and returned to Hawaiʻi in 1945. After he returned he worked with Daizo Sumida and Shuichi Fukunaga to revive the Chamber. He was elected president again in 1948. Iida was also the first president of Central Pacific Bank, which he founded alongside Lawrence Takeo Kagawa and several others in 1954. When Ala Moana Shopping Center opened in 1959, Iida store was one of the first 50 stores in the mall, operating in that location until 2005.

Iida was awarded the Order of the Sacred Treasure, 5th class, in 1965. In 1970, he retired from his position as Board Member of Central Pacific Bank. He died on November 8, 1973.
