= Iga Mori =

Japanese physician

Iga Mori (毛利伊賀) (February 11, 1864 – May 12, 1951) was a Japanese physician who practiced in Hawaii. He was an active community leader who helped to found the Kuakini Medical Center.

== Early life and education ==
Mori was born on February 11, 1864, in Ishikawa prefecture, Japan. He was born Igajiro Oguri, and was renamed Iga Mori when he was adopted into the Mori clan in Kanazawa. He studied at the Naval Medical School in Tokyo, then went abroad to study at Cooper Medical College, graduating in 1891.

== Career ==
After graduation, Mori was recruited by the Hawaiian Kingdom to care for Japanese workers at a sugar plantation in Olaa, near Hilo. He did this until 1894, when he was called back to Japan to serve in the Sino-Japanese War. His service earned him the Order of the Sacred Treasure, sixth class. After the war, he returned to Hawaii and helped to found a hospital with Sanzaburo Kobayashi and Matsujiro Misawa. Some of his patients included Queen Liliuokalani and Count Munemitsu Mutsu.

In 1898, Mori briefly traveled to Scotland to study pathology and bacteriology at the University of Glasgow.

After the Chinatown fire in 1900, Mori worked as a member of the Japanese Benevolent Society to start a charity hospital, which later became Kuakini Medical Center. Mori held leadership positions in community organizations such as the Japanese Benevolent Society, the United Japanese Society, the Higher Wage Association, and the Institute of Pacific Relations. He was also on the Board of Directors for Mid-Pacific Institute. Mori created a collection of Asian books at the Hawaii State Public Library.

During World War II, Mori was arrested by the FBI after the attack on Pearl Harbor. Unlike his son, Motokazu Mori, and his daughter in law, Ishiko Mori, he was quickly released and was not incarcerated on the mainland. He retired when the war started, but continued treating minor problems and giving vaccinations.

Mori died on May 12, 1951.
