= Furuya =

Furuya (written: ふるや, 古谷 or 古屋) is a Japanese surname. Notable people with the surname include:

- Keiji Furuya (古屋 圭司, born 1952), Japanese politician
- Kenichi Furuya (古屋 健一, 1912–1988), Japanese ice hockey player
- Kumaji Furuya (古屋 熊次, 1899-1977), Japanese businessman in Hawaii
- Masajiro Furuya (古屋 政次郎, 1862–1938), Japanese American banker, merchant and businessman
- Megumi Furuya (古谷 仁, born 1981), Japanese actress, singer and gravure idol
- Minoru Furuya (古谷 実, born 1972), Japanese manga artist
- Mitsutoshi Furuya (古谷 三敏, 1936–2021), Japanese manga artist
- Naohiro Furuya (古谷 直広, born 1963), Japanese racing driver
- Noriko Furuya (古屋 範子, born 1956), Japanese politician
- Sari Furuya (古谷 沙理, born 1990), Japanese biathlete
- Seiichi Furuya (古屋 誠一, born 1950), Japanese photographer
- Takuya Furuya (古谷 拓哉, born 1981), Japanese baseball player
- Tsunehira Furuya (古谷 経衡, born 1982), Japanese critic
- Tōru Furuya (古谷 徹, born 1953), Japanese narrator and voice actor
- Usamaru Furuya (古屋 兎丸, born 1968), Japanese manga artist

== See also ==
- 13815 Furuya, an outer main-belt asteroid
