= Sanzaburo Kobayashi =

Japanese surgeon (1863–1926)

Sanzaburo Kobayashi (also romanized as Sansaburo) (小林 参三郎) (1863 – 1926) was a Japanese surgeon. He founded hospitals in Hawaii and Japan, and also founded the Seizasha Dojo.

== Biography ==
Kobayashi was born in 1863 in Harima, Japan to a family of pharmacists. In 1883, he began to study medicine under Matsumoto Jun. Once he was licensed to practice in Japan, he decided to study abroad. He studied at the Cooper Medical College, then practiced medicine in San Francisco. He also traveled to England and Germany, where he later learned bacteriology.

Kobayashi moved to Hawaii in 1892. At first, he lived in Wailuku and became well known for doing brain surgeries. He, fellow Cooper graduate Iga Mori, and Matsujiro Misawa opened a small hospital in central Honolulu in 1896. The hospital later expanded and moved to Liliha, a neighborhood in Honolulu, in 1899. It was called the Japanese Hospital, but is not to be confused with the Japanese Charity Hospital that was formed by the Japanese Benevolent Society and later became the Kuakini Medical Center.

In 1901 Kobayashi fell gravely ill, and called for someone to give him his last rites. Yemyo Imamura came and prayed for him. When Kobayashi got better, he was so influenced by Imamura that he converted to Shingon Buddhism. He became a member of the Young Men's Buddhist Association, and published articles in their magazine, the Dōhō.

After his conversion, Kobayashi's healing philosophy mixed Buddhism and medicine. He moved back to Japan in 1908 and started a Buddhist hospital in Kyoto. He and his wife Nobuko also started the Seizasha Dojo. They suggested that conditions like neurasthenia could be treated by sitting quietly in the seiza position following Torajiro Okada's "Okada-shiki seiza" (Okada-style seiza) method. They claimed that doing so would calm and purify the patient's thoughts.

Kobayashi died in 1926.

== Selected bibliography ==
- Kobayashi, Sanzaburo (1922). 生命の神秘 : 生きる力と医術の合致. Tokyo: 杜翁全集刊行会.
- Kobayashi, Sanzaburo (1924). 自然の名医 : 医術に応用された静座. Tokyo: 春秋社.
