= Kumaji Furuya =

Japanese businessman

Kumaji Furuya (古屋熊次)(February 22, 1889 – November 4, 1977) was a Japanese businessman who worked in Hawaii. He started the Fuji Furniture store in Aala, and created Hawaii's first Japanese-language radio program. His penname was Suikei(翠溪).

== Early life ==
Furuya was born on February 22, 1889, in Yamanashi Prefecture, Japan, and moved to the territory of Hawaii in 1907. He originally planned to move to the United States, but the 1907 Gentleman's Agreement banned him from moving there, so he stayed in Hawaii. Furuya worked in sugar plantations and stores all across the islands for five years. In 1914, he opened up a store of his own, the Fuji furniture store. He also joined the Japanese Merchants Association (Chuo Rengo) in 1918. He later helped with a merger between the Japanese Merchants Association and two other organizations to become the Honolulu Japanese Chamber of Commerce (HJCC) in 1939. He served as the Vice President of the HJCC and the United Japanese Society for two years.

He married Jun Kitagawa in 1921.

Furuya was also an avid haiku poet. He followed the style of Seisensui Ogiwara, and even gave him a tour of the Big Island in 1937, when the esteemed poet visited Hawaii. Furuya was a member of a couple of haiku clubs, and had poems published in Ogiwara's literary journal, Sōun.

In 1929, Furuya started a radio program in order to boost radio sales at his store. It was entirely in Japanese, and played on KGU, which only broadcast in English at the time. He was the announcer and producer of the program, and steadily gained more supporters and sponsors. Japanese-language programming steadily grew until 1941, when it had grown to fill 40 hours per week.

== Incarceration ==
Furuya was arrested by the FBI on December 7, 1941, after the bombing of Pearl Harbor. He was interned in the Sand Island Internment Camp until February 20, 1942, when he was sent to the mainland with other Japanese-American internees. He was incarcerated at five different internment camps across the United States, until he was finally incarcerated at the Department of Justice's Santa Fe camp.

== Post-war ==
On November 13, 1945, Furuya was released and returned to Hawaii. In 1951, he was elected the president of the Honolulu Japanese Chamber of Commerce.

In 1968, Furuya was awarded an Order of the Sacred Treasure, 5th class.

He died on November 4, 1977.

== Selected bibliography ==
- Furuya, Suikei (2016). Haisho Tenten 配所転々 [An Internment Odyssey]. Honolulu, Hawai'i: Japanese Cultural Center of Hawaii. ISBN 978-0-9761493-3-0. OCLC 952195734.
- —— (1968). Imin no rakugaki 移民の落書き. Hawaii Times.
