= Crystal City Internment Camp =

- U.S. National Register of Historic Places
- U.S. Historic district
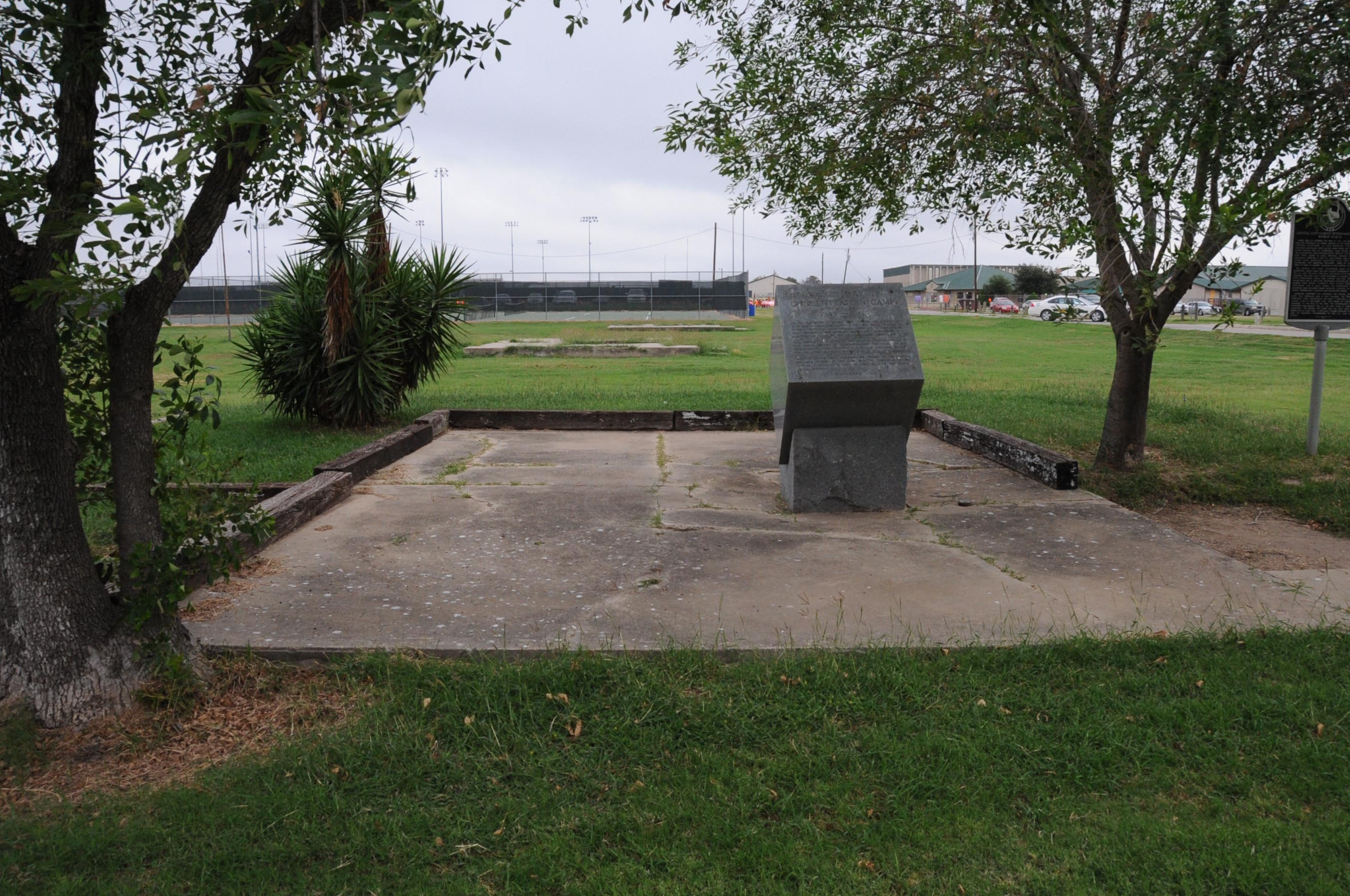
- Camp memorial

- Location within Texas Location within the United States
- Location: Roughly bounded by Airport Drive, Popeye Lane, North 7th & North 12th Avenues, Crystal City, Texas
- Coordinates: 28°41′27″N 99°49′22″W
- Built: 1943
- NRHP reference No.: 14000474
- Added to NRHP: August 1, 2014

Crystal City Internment Camp, located near Crystal City, Texas, was a place of confinement for people of Japanese, German, and Italian descent during World War II, and has been variously described as a detention facility or a concentration camp. The camp, which was originally designed to hold 3,500 people, opened in December 1943 and was officially closed on February 11, 1948.

Officially known as the Crystal City Alien Enemy Detention Facility (more commonly referred to as U.S. Family Internment Camp, Crystal City, Texas), the camp was operated by the Immigration and Naturalization Service (INS) under the Department of Justice and was originally designed to hold Japanese families, but later held German families, as well, including many who were deported from Latin American countries to the U.S. A significant number of those incarcerated were native-born American citizens. Over 127,000 United States citizens were imprisoned during World War II. The Crystal City Internment Camp was one of the primary confinement facilities in the United States for families during World War II.

The detention camps were described at the time as an "internal security" measure, but are now considered to have been "unjust and motivated by racism rather than real military necessity", as reported by the Commission on Wartime Relocation and Internment of Civilians.

The camp held 3,374 detainees on December 29, 1944. This was the maximum it ever held.

== Establishment of camp ==
Crystal City, named after the town it neighbors and located 110 miles (180 km) south of San Antonio, was one of the largest camps in Texas. Before the war, Crystal City had been a migrant labor camp, built by the Farm Security Administration (FSA) to house an influx of migrant workers who came to farm the area's most profitable crop, spinach.

At the start of World War II, thousands of Japanese and German residents of the U.S., including both U.S. citizens and resident aliens, were arrested and separated from their families during their initial detention. The FSA camp was turned over to the INS to allow these so-called "enemy aliens" to be reunited with their wives and children, and the first group of 35 German families arrived on December 12, 1942.

Women and children from Camp Seagoville, which was opened to house Latin American Japanese and became overcrowded with the addition of domestic Japanese American incarcerees, began arriving in early 1943, and their husbands and fathers were transferred to Crystal City from Camp Kenedy and several War Relocation Authority camps, beginning in June. By August 1944, the camp held 2,104 people of Japanese ancestry (about half from Latin America) and 804 people of German descent, housed separately by ethnicity.

== The internees ==
=== Latin Americans ===
Early in the war, in the name of "hemispheric security", the United States government began negotiations with several Latin American countries to round up and deport German and Japanese nationals who had been living in those countries. Upon their arrival in New Orleans, Louisiana, the initial male deportees were arrested on the grounds that they had attempted to enter the country illegally (having been denied visas by immigration authorities) and detained at various INS stations in the region, before being relocated to the internment camps at Kenedy, Texas, and Santa Fe, New Mexico. Their wives and children followed them later — ostensibly as volunteers, although most families lacked feasible alternatives to deportation.

Once incarcerated in the United States, they could then be sent to Germany or Japan in exchange for the return of American citizens and diplomats stranded in Axis nations. The prisoner-exchange program proved to be short-lived, and eventually transitioned into a "repatriation" program in which German and Japanese nationals and their families (including many children who had never been to their "home" country) were deported once again to Germany and Japan. The majority of Crystal City's Latin American population was transported to Germany and Japan at the end of the war, although several hundred Japanese Peruvians were allowed to remain in the U.S. after a two-year legal battle.

Of the nearly 1,500 Latin American Japanese confined in Crystal City during the war, almost 80% came from Peru. The 234 Latin American Germans had been deported from Bolivia, Colombia, Guatemala, Costa Rica, Honduras, and Nicaragua, in addition to a few from Haiti.

=== German and Japanese Americans ===
The Crystal City camp also held Japanese and German Americans who previously lived in many different parts of the United States. Noncitizen Japanese and German men were arrested in large numbers immediately after the attack on Pearl Harbor and forcibly incarcerated in various INS, U.S. Army, and Department of Justice detention sites before being transferred to Crystal City, where they were reunited with their families. The first German American incarcerees arrived in December 1942 from Ellis Island and Camp Forrest. The first Japanese Americans were women and children brought to Crystal City from Seagoville in March 1943. Additional Japanese Americans were transported by train from western detention facilities and WRA camps in the following months. Most of the Japanese-American incarcerees were transported from the West Coast, while the German Americans were brought from numerous locations throughout the United States.

== Internment life ==
Actors and others at Girl Scout dramatic presentation at Hinamatsuri (Doll's Festival) on Japanese Girl's Day on stage at Crystal City Internment Camp, Crystal City, Texas, 1943-45

The idea of family internment was a new concept proposed with regards to the detention of German and Japanese aliens in World War II. In the Crystal City internment camp, German and Japanese internees lived separately from one another and were placed in two different sections of the camp. Crystal City INS officials justified the segregation as a way to monitor both groups. The Crystal City Internment Camp received large numbers of detainees from other internment facilities in the United States and the camp became overpopulated.

The camp's German section provided its internees with a German bakery, mess hall, community hall, and cottages. Large German families were given their own cottages that included showers, kitchens, bathrooms, and hot water. A weekly German-language newsletter was published, with the title Unter uns.

The Japanese section included a Japanese school, the Federal High School, the Federal Elementary School, a citrus orchard, and several recreational facilities such as tennis courts, basketball courts, a football field, and a swimming pool. The Japanese internees of the camp lived in housing with running water and iceboxes.

=== Children ===
Almost all of the children held at the Crystal City internment camp were native-born American citizens whose parents were alien non-citizens. Each child at the Crystal City Internment Camp received a quart of milk each day. Three schools were established: the German School, the Japanese School, and the American Schools of Federal Elementary and Federal High School. The schools provided the interned students with all of the basic programs that schools in Texas were required to have.

Established in January 1943, the American School at the Crystal City Internment Camp educated over 1000 students before being closed in June 1946. Most of the American School's students at Crystal City were Japanese-American internees and a large number of the students were later accepted into various universities in the United States. The parents of German-American students refused to send their children to the American School, preferring education at the German School. The German-American children who transferred into the German School from the American School often struggled in the classroom because they were unable to speak German fluently. The German School and the American Schools had similar enrollments, and each school educated about 350 students. The Japanese School educated about 300 Latin American Japanese and Japanese American students. The Japanese School's curriculum resembled the curriculum students in Japan received, focusing on Japanese morals, ethics, and physical education.

=== School closing ===
On January 24, 1946 Crystal City Internment Camp official J. L. O'Rourke closed the German and Japanese schools and ordered that all remaining students enroll in the American schools. The American schools were then closed on June 28, 1946, but only 16 Japanese students still remained in Crystal City with their parents. The population of the camp was already low because numerous internees were repatriated to their native countries after the war ended. The INS rejected the proposed idea of transferring the Japanese students into public schools near Crystal City. Due to the INS decision and the lack of resources to move elsewhere, the remaining Japanese internees reinstalled the Japanese School.

== Camp closing ==
In 1945, as the war was coming to an end, delegates to the Mexico City Conference on the Problems of War and Peace declared that a person would be subject to removal from the Western Hemisphere should their remaining in the Americas prove "prejudicial" to security, and in September, President Harry Truman issued a proclamation that authorized the deportation of enemy aliens in the U.S. "without admission under the immigration laws." At the end of the year, the camp still held 3,374 inmates: 2,371 Japanese, 997 Germans, and 6 Italians. By December, 660 Japanese Peruvians (whose country prohibited them from returning) had been transported to Japan and 600 Japanese Hawaiians were returned to their prewar communities. By June 1946, most of the remaining German and Japanese internees, including another 900 Japanese Peruvians, had been deported. Crystal City remained open, however, to house Japanese Peruvians who had refused to participate in the government's repatriation program. With the help of civil rights attorney Wayne M. Collins, 364 internees filed a lawsuit and, after two years, obtained parole to work at Seabrook Farms in New Jersey. The Crystal City Internment camp was officially closed upon their release on February 11, 1948.

== Legacy ==
The site of the camp is now owned by the local school district, and is marked by a granite stone engraved with "World War II Concentration Camp, 1943-1946", which was installed in November 1985. The Texas Historical Commission undertook archaeological excavations at the site in April 2013, in preparation for nominating the site for listing on the National Register of Historic Places. The listing was approved August 1, 2014.

== Notable persons ==
- Yoshiaki Fukuda (1898–1957), a Konko bishop and missionary. Also interned at Fort Missoula and Topaz
- Major Arthur D. Jacobs USAF, an internee who wrote a memoir of his experiences
- Ishiko Mori (1899–1972), a physician and a correspondent for the Yomiuri Shinbun
- Motokazu Mori (1890–1958), a surgeon and tanka poet
- Isamu Shibayama (1930–2018), a civil-rights activist who fought for the rights of Latin Americans of Japanese ancestry
- Tokiji Takei (1903–1991), a Japanese poet and essayist
- Edison Uno (1929–1976), a Japanese-American civil-rights advocate. Also interned at Granada

Lt Col USAF retired Adolf “Wes” J Wesselhoeft, born American to parents who were not yet American. Wes was traded into war-time Germany in February 1944. He was allowed to return to the US in 1958. In 2018, he published Wesselhoeft: Traded to The Enemy, a book about his experiences to which his wife also contributed.

== See also ==
- National Register of Historic Places listings in Zavala County, Texas
