= Okinawans in Hawaii =

Ethnic group

Total population
- 45,000–50,000

Languages
- English, Hawaiian, Hawaiian Pidgin, Okinawan, Japanese

Related ethnic groups
- Ryukyuan people, Japanese in Hawaii

Okinawans in Hawaii (Okinawan: ハワイ沖縄人, romanized: Hawai uchinānchu) number between 45,000 and 50,000 people, or 3% of the U.S. state's total population.

== History ==
=== Immigration ===
The economy of the Ryukyu Islands plummeted following its annexation by Japan in 1879. As a result of worsening conditions, many Okinawans wished to move elsewhere for a better life. Previously, Japan had prohibited emigration from Okinawa Prefecture, but this decision was later reversed in the late 1890s. In 1899, the first group of Okinawan migrants were formed, numbering 26 people. Led by emigration activist Kyuzo Toyama, these laborers arrived in Hawaii on January 8, 1900. Subsequent waves of migrants came to Hawaii in the following years, with the second group, also led by Kyuzo, arriving in 1903. This group had 40 people.

Okinawa's declining economy was the main contributor of emigration, but other factors included the recession caused by the Russo-Japanese War and draft dodging.

=== Settlement ===
While many Okinawans wanted to return home after making enough money in Hawaii, many also stayed behind and permanently settled. This caused the formation of the Okinawan community of Hawaii. By 1908, over 8,500 Hawaii residents were of Okinawan descent.

Okinawans in Hawaii faced discrimination by the local Japanese community, who saw them as backwards due to cultural and linguistic differences. Common insults included "pig-eater", and many customs such as the hajichi (Okinawan female tattoos) were made fun of.

== Identity ==
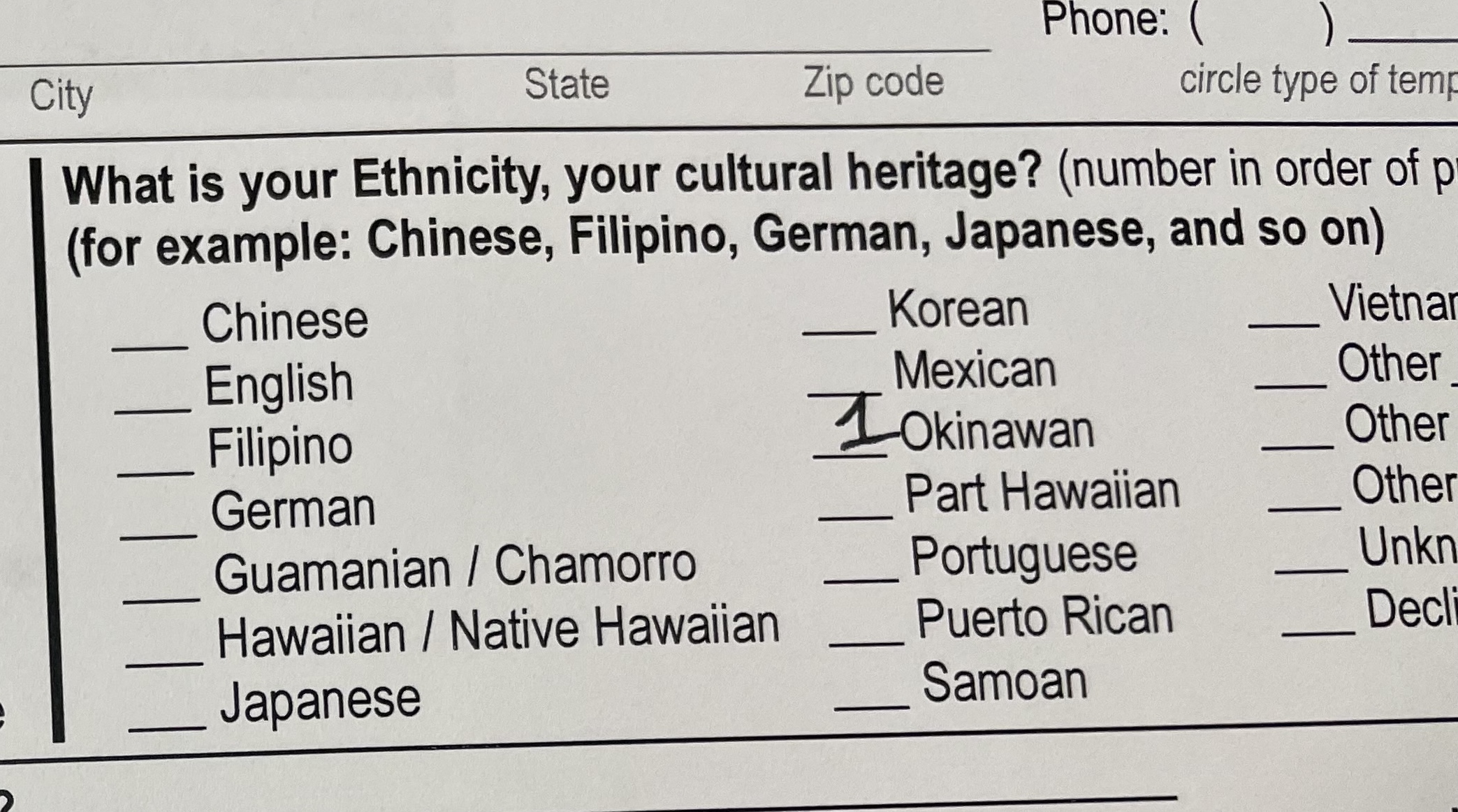
Okinawan listed as a separate ethnicity and cultural heritage from Japanese in a Hawaii hospital new patient form.

Because Okinawa used to be an independent country from Japan, many Okinawan migrants viewed themselves as a distinct group from the Yamato Japanese, or Naichi (内地, "inner lands"). The attitude of being a distinct group persists today among Hawaii Okinawans.

There are numerous cultural organizations for the Okinawans in Hawaii, the largest one being the Hawaii United Okinawa Association. As of 2020, it enrolls over 40,000 people across 50 different member clubs, each pertaining to a specific region in Okinawa. Since the 1970s, the HUOA has held an annual Okinawan Cultural Festival.

== Notable people ==
- Ryan Higa, YouTuber
- David Ige, former governor of Hawaii
- Rob Kajiwara, Okinawan-Hawaiian political activist
- Yeiki Kobashigawa, Medal of Honor recipient (WW2)
- Herbert Matayoshi, former mayor of Hawaii county
- Shinyei Nakamine, Medal of Honor recipient (WW2)
- Robert Taira, restaurant owner
- Toshiko Takaezu, artist
- Dwight Takamine, state senator
- Jill Tokuda, congresswoman
- Roy Yamaguchi, chef and entrepreneur
- Stephen K. Yamashiro, former mayor of Hawaii county

== See also ==
- Ryukyuan diaspora
