= Iida (surname) =

Iida (written: 飯田) is a Japanese surname. Notable people with the surname include:

- Akira Iida (飯田 章; born 1969), Japanese racing driver
- Chōko Iida (飯田 蝶子; 1897–1972), Japanese film actress
- George Iida (飯田 譲治; born 1959), Japanese film and television director, screenwriter, manga author, and novelist
- Kaori Iida (飯田 圭織; born 1981), Japanese singer and artist
- Kodai Iida (飯田 昴大; born 1994), Japanese footballer
- Koichi Iida ((飯田 鴻一, 1888–1973), Japanese businessman
- Jumpei Iida (飯田 淳平; born 1981), Japanese football referee
- Masaki Iida (飯田 真輝; born 1985), Japanese footballer
- Raura Iida (飯田 來麗; born 1998), Japanese singer and actress
- Riho Iida (飯田 里穂; born 1991), Japanese voice actress and singer
- Shōjirō Iida (飯田 祥二郎; 1888–1980), general in the Imperial Japanese Army in World War II
- Tatsumi Iida (飯田 健巳; born 1985), Japanese footballer
- Tetsu Iida (飯田 鉄; born 1948), Japanese photographer
- Tetsunari Iida (飯田 哲也; born 1959), director of the Institute for Sustainable Energy Policies in Japan
- Tetsuya Iida (飯田 哲也; born 1968), former Nippon Professional Baseball outfielder
- Tokuji Iida (飯田 徳治; 1924-2000), Nippon Professional Baseball first baseman and manager
- Umanosuke Iida (飯田 馬之介; born 1961), Japanese anime creator, director and screenwriter
