= National Register of Historic Places listings in Zavala County, Texas =

Location of Andrews County in Texas

This is a list of the National Register of Historic Places listings in Zavala County, Texas.

This is intended to be a complete list of properties and districts listed on the National Register of Historic Places in Zavala County, Texas. There is one property listed on the National Register in the county.

This National Park Service list is complete through NPS recent listings posted March 21, 2025.

== Current listings ==
The locations of National Register properties and districts may be seen in a mapping service provided.

	Name on the Register	Image	Date listed	Location	City or town	Description
1	Crystal City Internment Camp	Crystal City Internment Camp	August 1, 2014 (#14000474)	Roughly bounded by Airport Drive, Popeye Lane, North 7th & North 12th Avenues; 28°41′24″N 99°49′24″W	Crystal City	

== See also ==
- National Register of Historic Places listings in Texas
- Recorded Texas Historic Landmarks in Zavala County
