= Isamu Shibayama =

Peruvian-American civil rights activist

- イサム 柴山
- Born: 1930; Lima, Peru
- Died: July 31, 2018 (aged 87–88); San Jose, California, United States

Isamu 'Art' Carlos Shibayama (イサム カルロス 柴山, 1930 – July 31, 2018) was a Peruvian-American civil rights activist who fought for the rights of Latin Americans of Japanese ancestry who were illegally interned in the United States during World War II.

== Biography ==
Born in Lima, Peru in 1930, Shibayama was 13 years old when he, along with his family, were rounded up by the Peruvian police and shipped to the United States. Upon their arrival in New Orleans, they were arrested by the U.S. Immigration and Naturalization Service and transported to the Crystal City Internment Camp in Texas, where they were held as hostages, to be used in prisoner of war exchanges with Japan. They were part of a group of over two thousand Latin Americans of Japanese descent who suffered a similar fate, the large majority of which were Peruvians.

In 1946, a year after the war ended, Shibayama’s family was finally released from captivity, only to find themselves stranded in the United States because Peru refused to take them back. They fought deportation to Japan and were allowed to remain in the United States on condition that they obtain the support of a sponsor. Shibayama finally achieved legal alien status in 1956. In 1972 he was finally allowed to become a U.S. citizen.

In the Civil Liberties Act of 1988 the U.S. government provided reparations of $20,000 to Japanese Americans who were similarly interned acknowledging its wrongdoing and apologizing to them. However, this act did not apply to those who were not U.S. citizens at the time of the war. Years later, a coalition of Japanese Latin Americans called the Campaign for Justice sued for reparations and won its case. In 1999, the federal government expressed regret and awarded each of them $5,000 to settle a class-action lawsuit, Mochizuki v. United States. Shibayama, however, declined the payment and sued on his own demanding equality with the reparations to Japanese Americans. After he lost in federal court, he and his brothers filed a petition before the Inter-American Commission on Human Rights (IACHR) in 2003.

Shibayama died on July 31, 2018, in San Jose, California. His case was still pending as of the date of his death. The IACHR eventually ruled in his favor on August 4, 2020.

== Documentary ==
A documentary detailing US involvement in extraditing and forcibly interning Japanese-Peruvian nationals during WWII including a biography of Isamu Shibayama was produced in 2009 by Peek Media and the Japanese Peruvian Oral History Project.
