= Yoshiaki Fukuda =

Japanese-American Konko bishop (1898–1957)

Yoshiaki Fukuda (福田美亮, Fukuda Yoshiaki; July 22, 1898 – December 6, 1957) was a Konko bishop and missionary. He founded the Konko-kyo Church of San Francisco in 1930 and was the head of the Konko Federation in North America. He was considered a Group A prisoner during World War II and was a vocal leader for Japanese prisoners during the internment of Japanese Americans.

== Early life ==
Yoshiaki Fukuda was born in a village in Kitayama Village, Nara Prefecture, Japan, on July 22, 1898, to Kamejiro Fukuda and Kiwa Fusakabe. He served in the Japanese Army from 1918 to 1920, ranking as a second lieutenant. He attended Matsumoto College from 1921 to 1924 before enrolling at Japan's most prestigious college, Imperial University in Tokyo, which virtually guarantees success in business and government. Many of his classmates were successful businessmen and government officials, and one was the Secretary of Defense. While at university, Fukuda had a relapse of tuberculosis he had contracted as a child and turned to the Konko Faith for guidance. He recovered and decided to forgo a career in the Japanese government, entering the Konko seminary after graduating in 1927. In 1930, Fukuda and his wife Shinko (née Kimura), also a Konko minister, departed for the United States, settling in San Francisco and founding the Konko-kyo Church of San Francisco the same year.

== Internment ==
Fukuda was arrested on December 7, 1941, just hours after the attack on Pearl Harbor. He was classified as a Group A prisoner, who were, "Individuals believed to be the most dangerous and who in all probability should be interned in event of War." Thus, he was among the first Japanese to be arrested. Most other Japanese-Americans were not relocated until March 1942.

=== Missoula ===
Reverend Fukuda arrived at the Fort Missoula Internment Camp on December 29, 1941, with other Group A prisoners. Here, prisoners were interrogated by United States government officials regarding their "un-American" activities. At his hearing, Fukuda learned that the FBI had been tracking him for several years. They presented him with eight charges, including close association with the consuls general of the Japanese Foreign Service; accommodating members of the Japanese government, army, and navy; Meeting with the consuls general of Germany and Italy as well as presidents of both German and Italian Societies in San Francisco; being a reserve officer of Japanese army; holding receptions whenever Japanese navy ships visited San Francisco; sending food packages to Japanese army; visiting soldiers in Manchuria; being a member of Japanese Veterans Society. Fukuda repeatedly maintained that all of his communication was related to spreading the Konko faith to America. During his time in Missoula, he went on a three-week religious fast, losing 60 pounds.

=== Lordsburg ===
Fukuda was transferred to a camp near Lordsburg, New Mexico in May 1942. He led 5:30 morning services for Konko practitioners every day, and regularly gave speeches to the camp, giving him considerable influence with both internees and soldiers. He quickly was appointed leader of his barrack.

He was present at the Lordsburg killing of two internees, Toshiro Kobata and Hirota Isomura. They were shot at point-blank range, and "the other internees in Lordsburg were forced to dig the graves of the two dead men". Fukuda wrote letters to the Spanish Consul and the Department of Justice, the branch controlling the Lordsburg Camp, demanding an investigation. This eventually resulted in the guard's replacement from the camp. Fukuda routinely sent letters to these groups, along with the Red Cross and camp officials, when he saw mistreatment or other acts not in accordance with the Geneva Convention, which gave guidelines for the treatment of prisoners of war.

Fukuda realized after this incident that many internees did not understand their rights under the Geneva Convention. Therefore, he helped write and distribute copies to the approximately 1200 internees. According to his memoir, this helped the internees better understand and communicate with the camp guards.

=== Topaz ===
In February 1943, Fukuda was granted special permission to be with his wife, who was in critical condition due to a heart condition, and his seven children at the Topaz relocation camp. This was the first time he saw them since his initial arrest in 1941. He continued to make speeches and conduct religious services regularly. He publicly stated that he thought issei (first generation-Japanese immigrants) should stay loyal to Japan, while nisei (first-generation Japanese-Americans) should be loyal to the United States since they were United States citizens. This was a highly controversial statement, leading to his expulsion from Topaz by July.

While at Topaz, Fukuda witnessed the stress on other families who were separated in different camps. Topaz was a relocation center run by the Department of the Interior in which Group B and C, or less "dangerous", Japanese-Americans were imprisoned. Many families had members in the Department of Justice Camps such as Lordsburg, and the separation caused psychological harm to a good deal involved. Fukuda sent letters to many Japanese families urging them to apply for reunification at the Crystal City Internment Camp in Texas, the only Department of Justice Camp that housed families. While many had a stigma against these different types of camps, Fukuda argued that Crystal City had superior housing and education, given that it was the government's largest and "premier" camp.

=== Santa Fe ===
After being expelled from Topaz, Fukuda was transferred to another camp in Santa Fe, New Mexico, on July 23, 1943. As before, he was seen as a person of influence and made the leader of his barrack. The internees in the camp created a governing body whose aims were family reunification and standing up for internees, of which Fukuda was a member. He also helped internee workers get wages from the Santa Fe camp authorities, and he set up a camp newspaper. Said William Kelly, assistant commissioner of the INS, "he (Fukuda) has shown himself in a number of ways to be a troublemaker. He was, without doubt, one of the leaders, if not the leader, of the element at Santa Fe which recently delivered several threatening ultimatums."

=== Crystal City ===
Fukuda's request for family reunification was granted, and he was moved to Crystal City on February 10, 1944. Upon his arrival, officer in charge Joseph O'Rourke immediately handed him a memo from the Department of Justice that said Reverend Fukuda was forbidden from giving public speeches and holding a position in the camp. Even so, Fukuda still behaved in the same ways as he did in previous camps, holding mass for Konko believers and sticking up for internees. In Crystal City specifically, Fukuda requested the government to supply a new tuberculosis drug to the camp hospital. This was granted and resulted in almost all of the patients being cured. Due to his importance in the camp, as well as his influence feared by the US government, Fukuda was not released from imprisonment until September 29, 1947, over two years after the Japanese surrender of World War II.

== After the War ==
After the war ended, Fukuda stayed in Crystal City, serving as a minister, school principal, printer, and interpreter, among other jobs. At this time, many issei, including himself, were issued deportation letters, and he wrote many petitions on behalf of these people to pardon them from deportation. He served as an interpreter during a hearing on behalf of about 50 Japanese-Peruvians interned at Crystal City. The US wanted to deport them back to Peru, but Peru did not want them either. Fukuda offered to house them at his church in San Francisco until they found suitable employment, solving the matter. Once released, he once again focused on the growth of the Konko faith. Fukuda became a naturalized United States citizen in June 1955. He wrote a novel about his faith, entitled Live with Faith Being a Konko Believer, which was posthumously published in 1958.

=== Petition to President Eisenhower ===
Fukuda was still an important and active member of San Francisco's Japantown, and he witnessed the struggles that Japanese-Americans went through to reclaim lost properties, apply for or regain citizenship, and generally rebuild the lives they had before the war. He wrote a petition to President Dwight D. Eisenhower on February 10, 1957, in which he described these difficulties. He requested a change to the Evacuation Claims Act of 1948, which theoretically restored all lost property to Japanese Americans, but was largely a failure. He requested compensation for those killed unjustly in the camps, which the government continued to hide. He included personal experiences, such as the loss of his fourth son Yoshiro, who died in 1946 at Crystal City after a battle with kidney disease. Fukuda believed that with medical attention available outside the camps, Yoshiro could have been saved.

Fukuda never received a response from President Eisenhower. The United States government did not formally apologize and compensate former internees until 1988, 31 years after his petition.

== Personal life ==
Reverend Fukuda and his wife, Shinko, had seven children. Fukada died suddenly of a heart attack on December 6, 1957. He was 59 years old. His family continues to be involved with the Konko Church.
