= Motokazu Mori =

Motokazu "Taisanboku" Mori (毛利 元一, Mōri Motokazu; July 24, 1890 – January 21, 1958) was a Japanese surgeon and tanka poet who practiced in Hawaii.

== Biography ==
Mori was born on July 24, 1890, in Nagasaki, Japan. He was the son of the physician and community leader Iga Mori. Mori was raised in Japan by his grandmother, and grew up to study medicine at the Kyushu Imperial University and the Mayo Clinic. He moved to Hawaii in 1920 to practice medicine with his father. He earned a PhD in 1936 from the Tokyo Imperial University. He was one of the founders of the Choon Shisha, a tanka club in Honolulu, and also had a regular column in the Nippu Jiji.

Mori married Misao Harada, daughter of Tasuku Harada, in 1921. They had four children. After she died in 1927, he remarried Ishiko Shibuya, a physician at the Kuakini Medical Center. They had two children together.

On December 5, 1941, a reporter from the Yomiuri Shinbun called Mori to interview him about life in Hawaii. Mori's answers seemed suspicious to FBI agents who were monitoring the call. After Pearl Harbor was attacked two days later, he and Ishiko were accused of espionage and arrested. Mori was transferred to the Sand Island Internment Camp on January 5, 1942. He was then sent to incarceration camps in Angel Island, Lordsburg, and Santa Fe. He was finally transferred to the Crystal City camp in Texas, where he was reunited with his family. He and Ishiko worked as doctors in the camp, and were overwhelmed by the number of patients. However, they found the time to create a poetry club with Tokiji Takei, and to publish the camp's poetry anthology, Nagareboshi.

Mori returned to Hawaii on December 10, 1945. He reopened his medical practice and restarted the Choonshisha with Takei, Otokichi Ozaki, and Kumaji Furuya.

Mori died on January 21, 1958.
