= Mochizuki v. United States =

1999 class-action lawsuit

Mochizuki v. United States 43 Fed. Cl. 97 (1999) was a class action lawsuit brought by survivors of Japanese Latin Americans interned during World War II by the United States government. The lawsuit alleged forcible kidnapping and imprisonment. In a settlement, the government conceded it erred and allocated $5,000 each for survivor, as well as a formal apology from then-President Bill Clinton.

Of those incarcerated by the government, 17 opted out of this class action lawsuit, including Isamu Shibayama, who sued separately for the higher compensation awarded by the Civil Liberties Act of 1988 to citizen internees. After losing in federal court, Shibayama subsequently took his case to the Inter-American Commission on Human Rights, which ruled in his favor posthumously.

== See also ==
- List of class-action lawsuits
