= Wilcox Medical Center =

Coordinates: 21.9860°N 159.3647°W

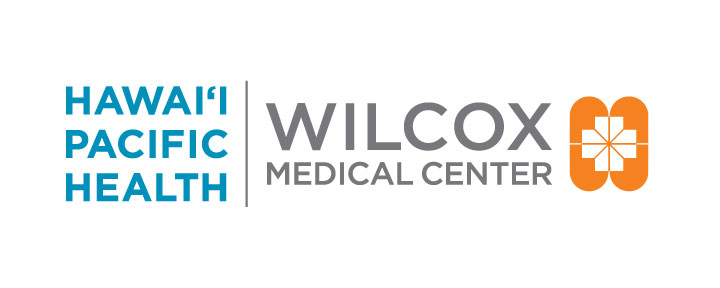

Geography
- Location: Lihue, Kauai, Hawaii, United States

Organization
- Care system: Community
- Type: Non-profit
- Network: Hawaii Pacific Health

Services
- Emergency department: Level III Trauma Center
- Beds: 72

History
- Founded: 1938

Links
- Website: https://www.wilcoxhealth.org
- Lists: Hospitals in Hawaii

Wilcox Medical Center is part of Hawaii Pacific Health's network. One of Kauaʻi island's three hospitals, Wilcox Medical Center provides Kauaʻi residents with an imaging center, emergency department, and surgical center.

== History ==
George Norton Wilcox and Dora Isenberg planned a community hospital with a staff open to all eligible physicians on Kauaʻi. It opened on November 1, 1938, with the official dedication of a T-shaped two-story building on 17 acres (6.9 ha) of land donated by the Lihue Plantation. It was built at a cost of $200,000. More than 1,000 Kauaʻi residents attended the ceremony, and 15 days later the new 96-bed hospital accepted its first patients.

Periodic expansion programs continued over the years. The first expansion took place from 1955 to 1958 with the addition of a kitchen, an obstetrical wing, medical library, conference room and additional space for laboratory and X-ray departments. Another milestone was reached in 1966 with the advent of the Outpatient Department built adjacent to the main hospital. Plantation dispensaries were phased out at this time and the eastside physicians began practice in the facilities, later forming the Kauai Medical Group Inc.

The third expansion was completed in August 1971 and resulted in the present $4.2 million Acute Patient Care Tower and Special Diagnostic and Treatment Facility. A laboratory and physical therapy building opened in 1977.

Since then, remodeling and renovation has been ongoing to accommodate the hospital's many new services and programs, which includes an Intensive Care Unit, Coronary Care Unit and a CT and MRI facility in the Imaging Department, which was renovated and expanded to include more exam space and updated equipment. In 2005, the department was named the Wilcox Family Imaging Center after the Wilcox family of Kauaʻi.

Wilcox Medical Center treated surfer Bethany Hamilton in 2003 after she lost her arm to a 14-foot (4.3 m) tiger shark off the north shore of Kauaʻi.

In 2010, the Wilcox Health Women's Center opened to provide preventive and diagnostic care for Kauaʻi's women.

In 2016, Wilcox Memorial Hospital rebranded itself as Wilcox Medical Center.

Between 2020 and 2022, Wilcox Medical Center received two major gifts. One 2.5 million dollar gift gifted by Jenn Gross and Peter Stengaard helped renovate Wilcox's Emergency Department and the new trauma center is named in their honor. Another gift of 1.8 million dollars by Dr. Priscilla Chan and Mark Zuckerberg, upgraded Wilcox's imaging center with a CT Scanner that replaced one of their two aging ones.

In 2022, The new Gross & Stengaard Trauma Center opened to the public.
