= Hawaii Pacific Health =

American nonprofit health care network

- Company type: Not-for-profit organization
- Industry: Health care
- Founded: 2001
- Headquarters: Honolulu, Hawaii, United States
- Area served: Hawaii
- Website: hawaiipacifichealth.org

Hawaii Pacific Health is a nonprofit health care network of hospitals, clinics, physicians and care providers covering Hawaii and the Pacific Region.

== History ==
Hawaii Pacific Health was formed in December 2001 with the merger of four hospitals: Kapiolani Medical Center for Women & Children, Pali Momi Medical Center (formerly Kapiolani Medical Center at Pali Momi), Straub Clinic & Hospital, and Wilcox Memorial Hospital. It is the largest nonprofit? healthcare organization in Hawaii.

Hawaii Pacific Health has plans to open a $3.1 million medical clinic in summer 2019 in the Aeo residential tower in Kaka'ako. Hawaii Pacific Health also plans to open similar clinics in Kapolei at Ka Makana Ali'i, Kuono Marketplace in Kahala, and on Kauai.

== Community Partner ==
- Hawaii Pacific Health is affiliated with the University of Hawaii John A. Burns School of Medicine and Hawaii Pacific University.
- Hawaii Pacific Health is a member of the University of Hawai'i Cancer Center Consortium.
