= Ishiko Mori =

Ishiko Mori (毛利石子 Mori Ishiko) (July 21, 1899 – January 6, 1972) was a Japanese physician and a correspondent for the Yomiuri Shinbun.

== Early life and education ==
Mori was born Ishiko Shibuya on July 21, 1899 in Chiba, Japan. She was born to a family of physicians. Her parents died when she was young, so she was raised by her aunt and uncle. When she was a teenager, she decided to become a physician in order to avoid an arranged marriage to a much older man. She studied at the Tokyo Women's College. When she graduated she was discouraged from practicing in Japan because women were only allowed to be either pediatricians or gynecologists.

== Career ==
In 1927, Mori moved to Hawaii and worked at the Japanese Hospital, which was later known as the Kuakini Medical Center. She met and married physician Motokazu Mori, and they had two children together. She returned to Japan for both births, and quit her job at the hospital to raise them. Mori and her husband were also tanka poets, and she wrote under the penname "Shakunage".

In 1934, she became the Yomiuri Shinbun's special correspondent in Hawaii. On December 3, 1941, the newspaper asked her to interview influential Japanese people in Hawaii about conditions there. She asked the Consulate General and several others, but after they declined she asked Motokazu to do the interview. On December 5, a reporter from the Yomiuri Shinbun called Motokazu to interview him about life in Hawaii. His answers seemed suspicious to FBI agents who were monitoring the call. After Pearl Harbor was attacked two days later, both Ishiko and Motokazu were accused of espionage and arrested. Mori was incarcerated at Sand Island, Sharp Park (California), and finally Crystal City Internment Camp. She and Motokazu founded the camp's hospital, and Mori started a girl scout troop.

Mori returned to Honolulu on December 10, 1945. Mori began working as a research assistant at the American Cancer Society. She also continued writing for Japanese newspapers. She continued working as Motokazu's health worsened. During the late 1940s and through the 1950s, her in-laws, her daughter Pearl, and Motokazu all died. After Motokazu died, she transferred to the University of Hawaii's biomedical department as an epidemiology research assistant.

In 1968 Mori was honored by the Japanese government for her work improving understanding between Japan and the United States. She was diagnosed with lung cancer the next year. She died on January 6, 1972.
