= Japanese Cultural Center of Hawaii =

Cultural and community center for Japanese-Americans in Hawaii

Coordinates: 21.293955°N 157.823466°W

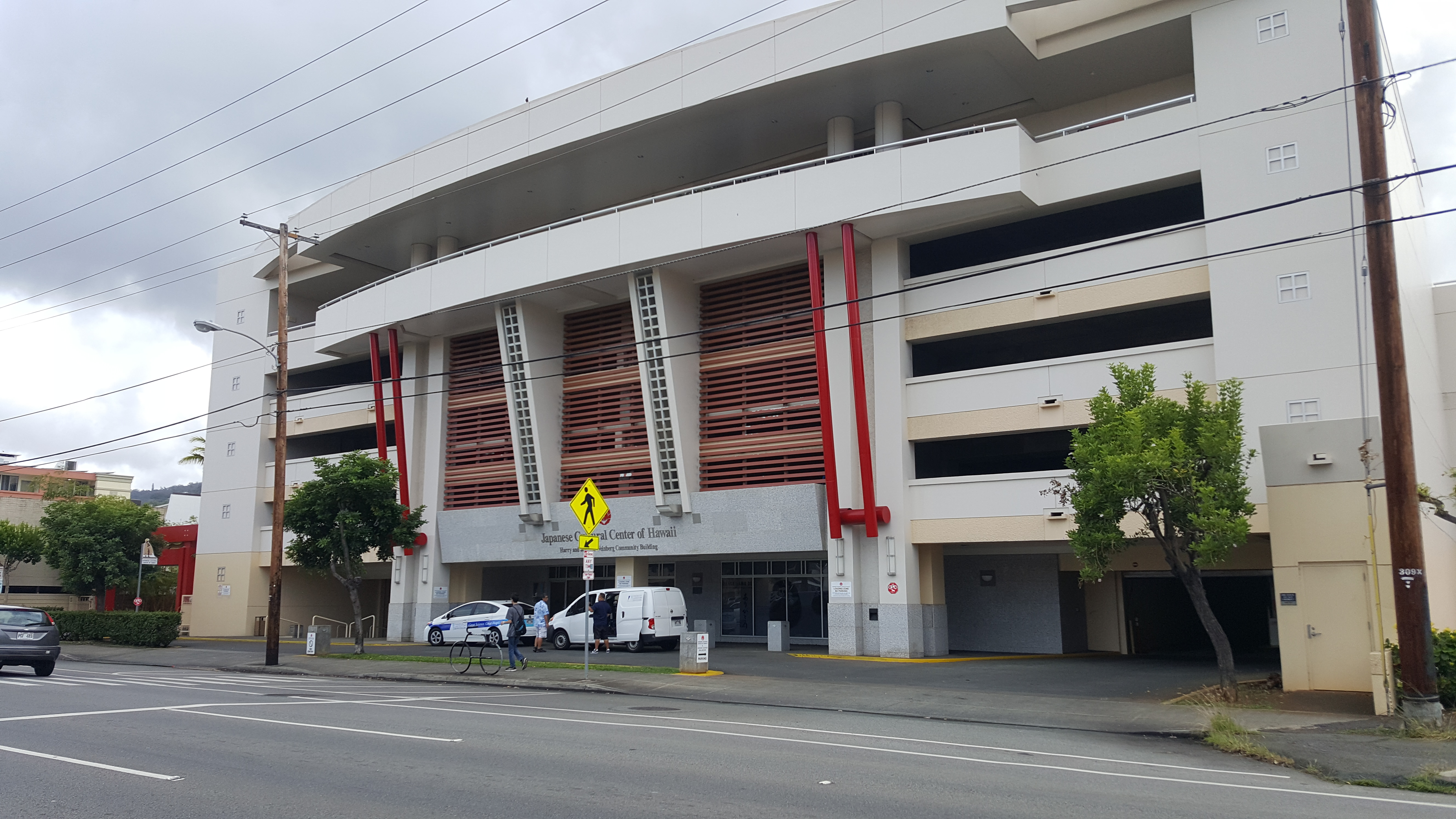
- Japanese Cultural Center of Hawaii, viewed from South Beretania Street
- Formation: May 28, 1987
- Type: cultural center, history museum, nonprofit
- Location: Moiliili, Hawaii
- Executive Director: Nate Gyotoku
- Website: https://www.jcchawaii.org/

The Japanese Cultural Center of Hawaii (JCCH, Japanese: ハワイ日本文化センター, Hawai Nihon Bunka Sentā) is a cultural center and history museum in Moiliili, Hawaii that focuses on the Japanese-American experience in Hawaii, especially internment.

== History ==
Plans to build the Japanese Cultural Center of Hawaii began in 1982, when the Honolulu Japanese Chamber of Commerce began planning to create a space where groups involved with Japanese culture could meet and practice their traditions. The Japanese Cultural Center of Hawaii opened on May 28, 1987 in Moiliili, a majority-Japanese neighborhood in Honolulu. By 1989, the fundraising committee had raised $7.5 million from the Keidanren and other Japanese organizations to buy land and construct a new building to house the organization. Construction of the first phase of the building was completed in 1991 (Harry & Jeanette Weinberg Building, named after the foundation that funded the construction), while the second was completed in 1994.

=== "Save the Center" ===
In 2002 the JCCH announced that it would sell off the building and the land it sat on in order to pay off millions of dollars in debt accrued during the construction of the second phase of the building. JCCH members started a committee to "Save the Center", headed by Colbert Matsumoto. They raised $6 million in 47 days, and the lenders forgave the $1.5 million in interest on the loan. The organization reduced the number of board members, changed leadership, and rewrote their mission statement. Once the debt was paid off, they were also able to focus more of their revenue and attention on programs and community outreach.

=== Finding Honouliuli Internment Camp ===
After receiving an inquiry about the location of the Honouliuli internment camp from KHNL in 1998, volunteers in the JCCH Resource Center rediscovered the site of the camp in 2002. After completing archaeological surveys with the University of Hawaii West Oahu, the JCCH pushed for the camp site to be included in the National Parks system as a National Monument. In 2014 the JCCH began producing short documentaries about internment, such as "The Untold Story: Internment of Japanese-Americans in Hawaii". Honouliuli became a National Monument in February 2015. The JCCH also received a series of grants to study and preserve the site, as well as to educate the public about internment in Hawaii.

== Exhibits ==
=== Okage Sama De: I am what I am because of you ===
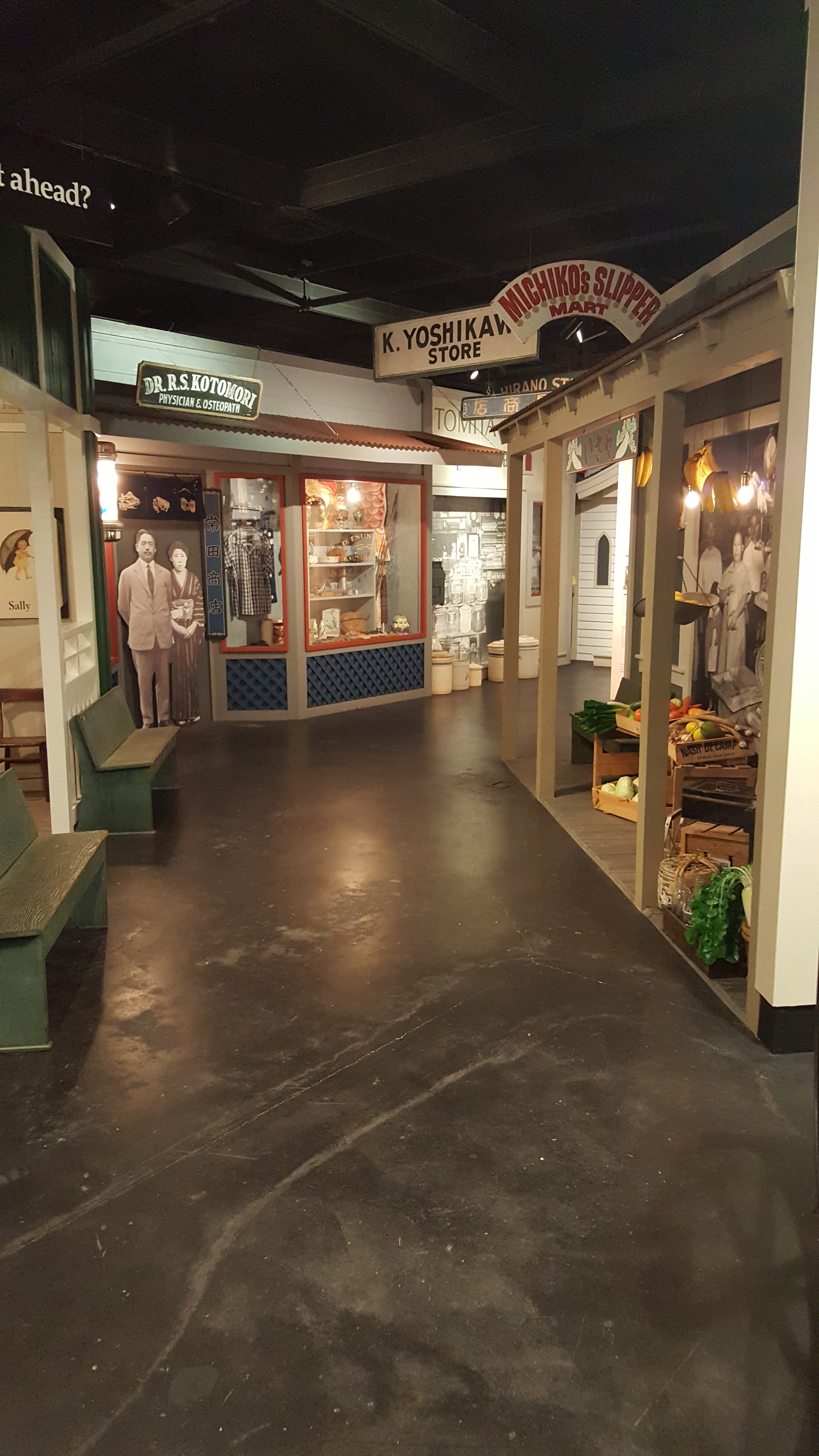
The shop scene from the JCCH "Okage Sama De" permanent exhibition.

The main exhibit at the Japanese Cultural Center of Hawaii is called "Okage Sama De: I am what I am because of you". It opened in 1995 and shows the history of Japanese immigration to Hawaii from 1868 to present. The exhibit begins by showcasing values that the issei immigrants brought with them, then moves on to depictions of plantation life, picture brides, World War II, the 100th Battalion and 442nd. There is a theater in the middle of the exhibit showing short documentaries produced by the Center. The exhibit then finishes with a section on post-war life in Hawaii.

It has held several travelling exhibits, such as the Go For Broke National Education Center's "Courage and Compassion: Our Shared Story of the Japanese American WWII Experience".

After the closure of the Ellison Onizuka Space Center in Kona, some of Onizuka's memorabilia that were on display there, including a Moon rock, were put on display in the Japanese Cultural Center's exhibit.

=== Honouliuli Education Center ===
The Honouliuli Education Center opened on October 26, 2016. It is an extension of the permanent exhibition "Okage Sama De", and focuses on the experiences of Japanese-American internees at the Honouliuli internment camp. It includes photographs, videos, artifacts used and created by the internees, and a virtual tour of the camp site.

== Events ==
=== New Years Ohana Festival ===
The Japanese Cultural Center of Hawaii has held the New Years Ohana Festival annually since 1993. The festival includes mochi pounding, performances, games, and a craft fair. Many vendors also serve Japanese food. There are also demonstrations of cultural arts such as tea ceremony, bonsai, and sumo.

=== Sharing the Spirit of Aloha Gala ===
The Gala is the Japanese Cultural Center of Hawaii's largest fundraiser. During the Gala the Center recognizes people who have contributed to the Japanese American community and promoted Japanese culture.

== See also ==
- Hawaii United Okinawa Association
- Japanese American National Museum
- Japanese in Hawaii
- Nisei Veterans Memorial Center
