= Tetsu Iida =

Japanese photographer (born 1948)

Tetsu Iida (飯田 鉄, Iida Tetsu; born 1948) is a Japanese photographer.
