= Straub Benioff Medical Center =

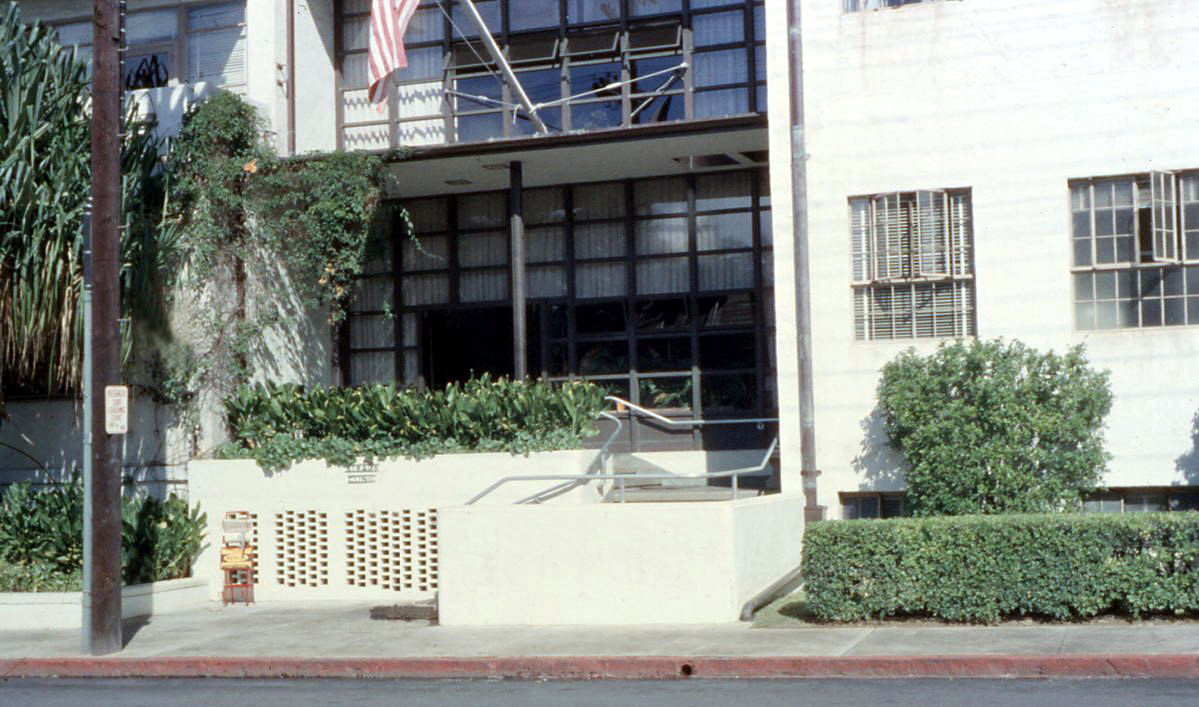

Geography
- Location: 888 South King Street Honolulu, Oahu, Hawaii, United States
- Coordinates: 21.302586°N 157.850542°W

Organization
- Care system: Community
- Type: General
- Network: Hawaii Pacific Health

Services
- Emergency department: Yes
- Beds: 159

History
- Founded: 1921

Links
- Website: www.straubhealth.org
- Lists: Hospitals in Hawaii

Straub Benioff Medical Center is not-for-profit health care system with a 159-bed hospital in Honolulu, and a network of neighborhood clinics.

== History ==
George F. Straub founded the clinic in 1921. Dr. Straub was educated in Germany and came to practice in Hawaii in 1907. In 1910, he conceived the idea of forming a group of physicians to provide better, more specialized care for his patients. It, however, took over 10 years to bring this idea to fruition.

The first step in 1912 was the construction of a wood-frame building at 410 South Beretania Street. Straub established his office on the first floor and his home on the second. By 1916 his practice had grown to the point that he recruited an assistant, Guy C. Milnor. Straub envisioned a clinic providing specialized care in five major fields: Obstetrics and Gynecology, Surgery, Internal Medicine, ENT, and Clinical Pathology. To this end, he next enlisted Arthur Jackson, a specialist in internal medicine in 1920 and the group carried on for a short time as Straub, Milnor, and Jackson.

In the latter part of 1920, Howard Clarke resigned his commission in the United States Army and joined as a specialist in Eye, Ear, Nose and Throat. Eric A Fennel also left the Army about this time and joined the group as pathologist.

In January, 1921, the five founding partners formally organized themselves as a legal partnership. At Straub's insistence the group he founded did not bear his name, and it was to be known simply as "The Clinic". A specialist in internal medicine and radiology, joined the clinic in 1921, a general surgeon in 1922, and a pediatrician joined in 1924.

In 1952 the clinic was renamed "Straub Clinic" in honor of Straub, who died in May, 1966.

On December 21, 2001, it became part of the Hawaii Pacific Health network.

Straub currently has a total of 10 locations on 3 Hawaiian Islands: Oahu, Lanai, and Hawaii Island.

On April 24, 2020, it was revealed that the Straub clinic was undergoing sex abuse lawsuits from people who claimed that one of clinic's former pediatricians John Stephenson, who committed suicide in 1970, sexually abused them when they were children.

Its burn unit, constructed in the 1980s, is the only facility of its kind in Hawaii, and the only one in the North Pacific region between California and Asia. It regularly takes patients from other Hawaiian islands, other Pacific nations and territories, and cargo ships at sea. It took nine patients from Maui who had been injured in the 2023 Hawaii wildfires, the largest mass casualty even in the hospital's history.
