= List of hospitals in Hawaii =

This is a list of hospitals in Hawaii (U.S. state), sorted by island and hospital name. According to the American Hospital Directory, there were 28 hospitals in Hawaii in 2020. There are hospitals on six of Hawaii's 137 islands.

== Hawaii (big island) ==
The following hospitals are on the big island of Hawaii:

- Hilo Benioff Medical Center - Hilo, 276 beds
- Ka'u Hospital - Pahala, 6 beds
- Kohala Hospital - Kapaau, 18 beds
- Kona Community Hospital - Kealakekua, 94 beds
- North Hawaii Community Hospital - Waimea (Kamuela), 33 beds

== Kauai ==
The following hospitals are on the island of Kauai:

- Kauai Veterans Memorial Hospital - Waimea, 45 beds
- Samuel Mahelona Memorial Hospital - Kapaa, 80 beds
- Wilcox Memorial Medical Center - Lihue, 72 beds

== Lanai ==
There is only one hospital on the island of Lanai:

- Lanai Community Hospital - 628 7th Street, Lanai City, 14 beds. This hospital is managed by Maui Health, which also manages two hospitals on Maui. It is a community health center providing primary care, dental, behavioral health and selected specialty services.

== Maui ==
There are two hospitals and one cancer institute on the island of Maui:

- Cancer Institute of Maui - Wailuku
- Kula Hospital - Kula, 123 beds. This hospital is managed by Maui Health, which is affiliated with Kaiser Permanente.
- Maui Memorial Medical Center - Wailuku, 219 beds. This hospital is managed by Maui Health.

== Molokai ==
There is only one hospital on the island of Molokai:

- Molokai General Hospital - 280 Homeolu Place, Kaunakakai, 15 beds. It was established as Shingle Memorial Hospital in 1932 by the Grace Episcopal Church. In 1949 it became the Molokai Community Hospital. In 1963, the hospital was moved to its current location in Kaunakakai, where it was known as the Molokai General Hospital. In Since 1985, this hospital has been part of the Queen's Health Systems family of companies.

== Oahu ==
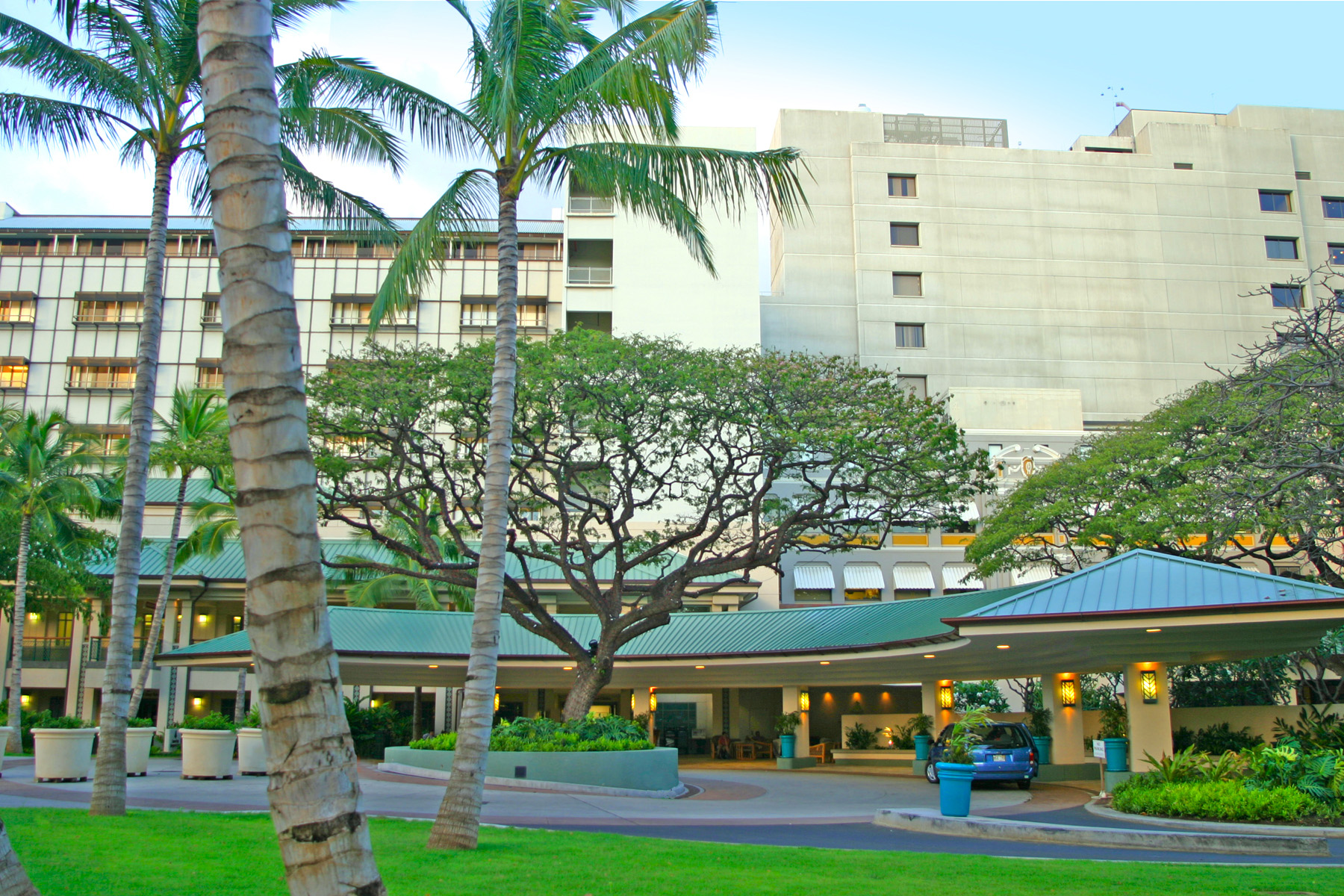
The Queen's Medical Center

Outside of Honolulu, there are six hospitals on the island of Oahu:

- Adventist Health Castle (formerly Castle Medical Center) - Kailua, 160 beds
- Hawaii State Hospital - Kaneohe, 144 beds
- Kahuku Medical Center, Kahuku, 21 beds
- Pali Momi Medical Center - Aiea, 118 beds
- The Queen's Medical Center West Oahu - ʻEwa Beach, 135 beds
- Wahiawa General Hospital - Wahiawa, 150 beds

=== Honolulu ===
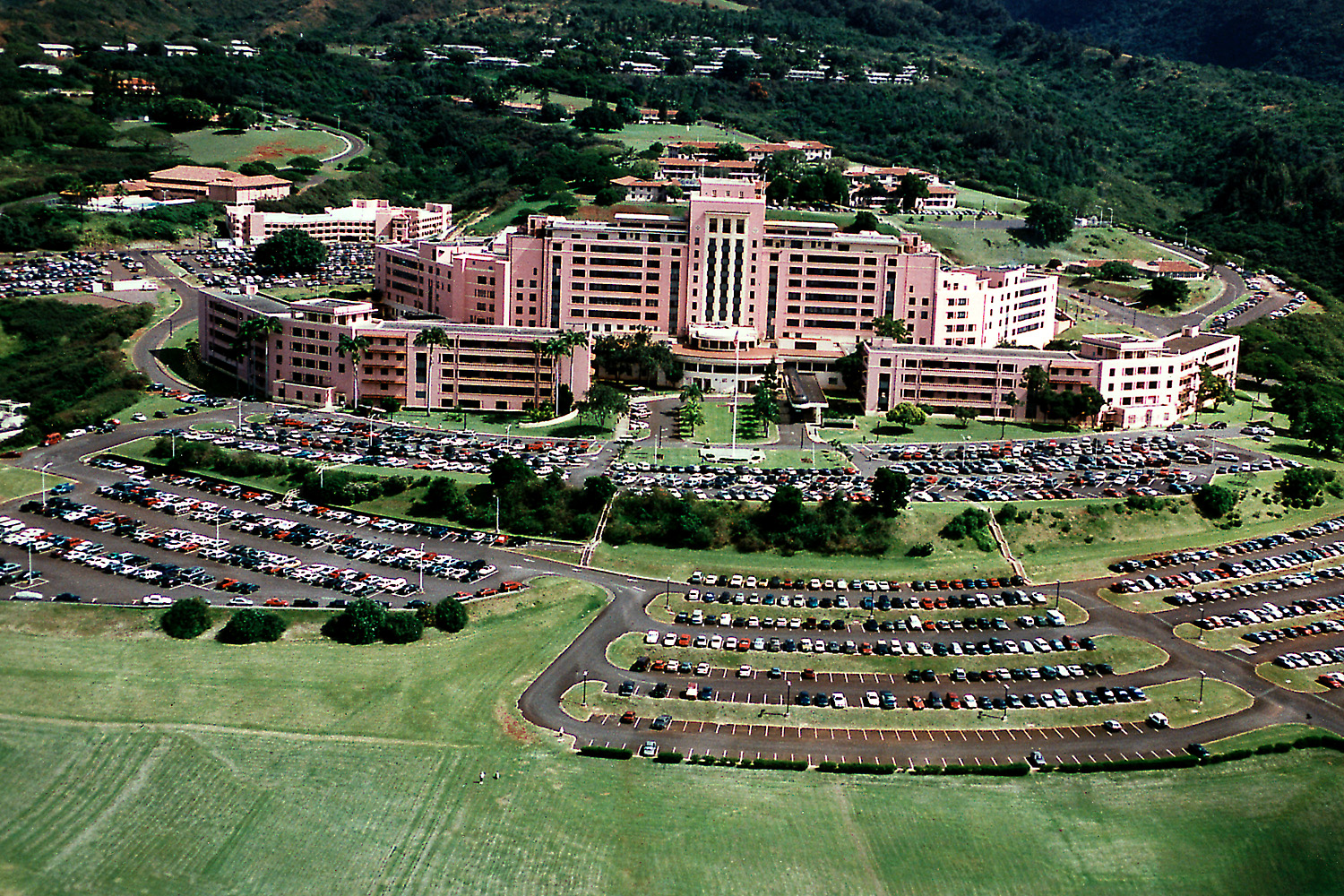
Tripler Army Medical Center

There are eight hospitals in Honolulu on the island of Oahu:

- Kaiser Permanente Moanalua Medical Center, 295 beds
- Kapi'olani Medical Center for Women & Children, 253 beds
- Kuakini Medical Center, 357 beds
- The Queen's Medical Center, Hawaii's only Level 1 Trauma Center, 650 beds
- REHAB Hospital of the Pacific, a specialized physical rehabilitation hospital
- Shriners Hospital for Children, 24 beds
- Straub Benioff Medical Center, 159 beds
- Tripler Army Medical Center, approximately 220 beds, expandable as needed
