= Kyuzo Toyama =

Japanese politician (1868–1910)

- 當山久三
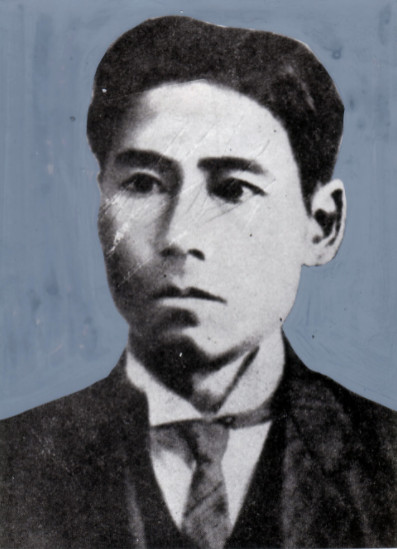
- Born: December 22, 1868; Kin Town, Ryukyu Kingdom
- Died: September 17, 1910 (aged 41); Yonabaru, Okinawa Prefecture, Japan

Kyuzo Toyama (當山 久三, Tōyama Kyūzō; 1868–1910) was an Okinawan political activist. He is commonly referred to as the "father of Okinawan emigration" due to his work in sending Okinawans abroad.

== Early life ==
In 1868, Toyama was born in the town of Kin, Okinawa to a wealthy family. However, his family started to become poorer due to the economic situation of Okinawa following integration into Japan.

== Emigration activism ==
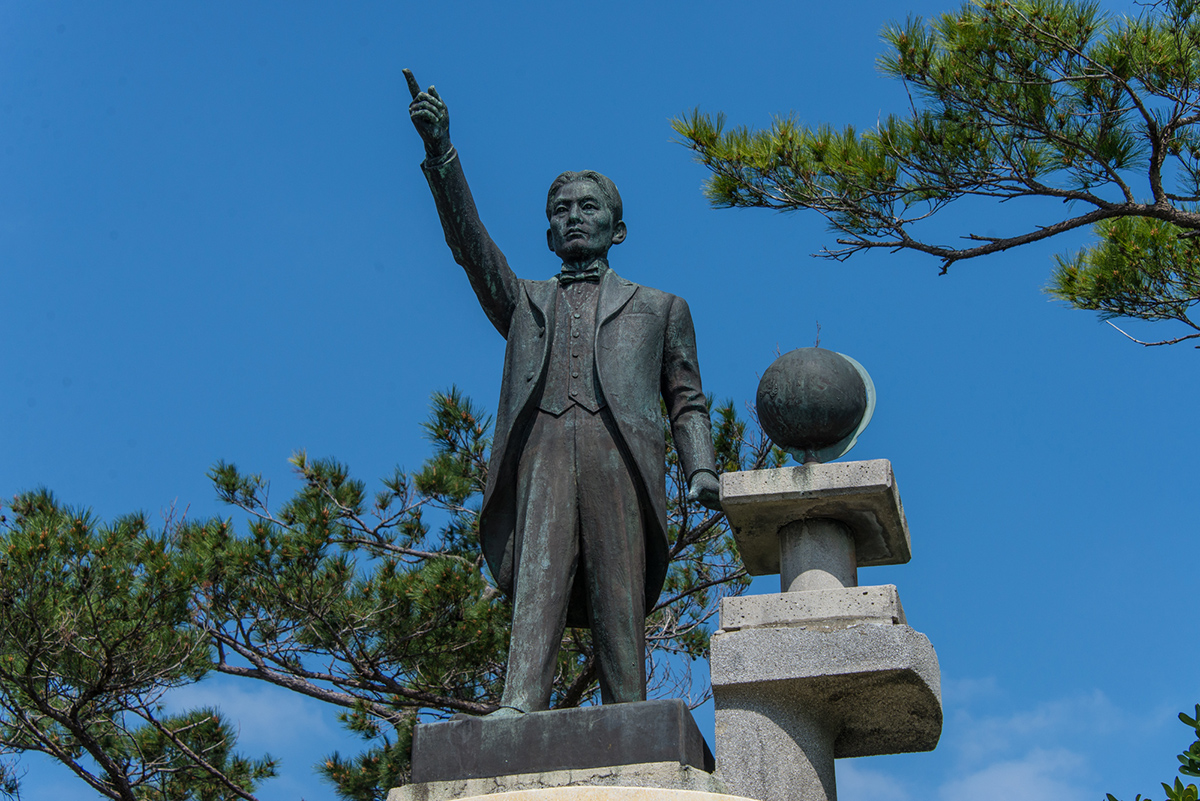
Statue of Kyuzo Toyama in Kin Town, Okinawa

In 1898, Toyama moved to Tokyo in order to find work. While he had little success finding a job, he became interested in the subject of emigration when he read a book about it in a used bookstore. A year later, he played a major role in sending the first Okinawan migrants to Hawaii, which already had migrants from other parts of Japan. In 1903, he led the second wave of Okinawan migrants and stayed in Hawaii for 6 months to investigate the treatment of these migrants, who worked for plantation companies.

== Political career ==
After his investigation in Hawaii, he returned to Okinawa and became an emigration agent, sending more Okinawans to Hawaii, North America and South America. In 1909, he was elected to be a part of the newly-established prefectural assembly of Okinawa but died a year later due to a disease.

== See also ==
- Ryukyuan diaspora
- Okinawans in Hawaii
- Ryukyuans in Brazil
- Emigration
