= Honolulu Japanese Chamber of Commerce =

Coordinates: 21.294056°N 157.823643°W

- Abbreviation: HJCC
- Formation: 1900
- Type: Non-governmental organization
- Purpose: Business
- Location: Honolulu, Hawaii

The Honolulu Japanese Chamber of Commerce (ホノルル日本人商工会議所) is a business organization that promotes economic growth in Hawaii and Japan.

== History ==
After the Chinatown fire of 1900, 37 Japanese businessmen formed the Emergency Japanese Association to help Japanese immigrants who became homeless because of the fire. The organization was soon renamed the Honolulu Japan Merchants Association (Honolulu Nipponjin Shonin Doshikai). Once all of the Japanese immigrants were rehoused and claims were filed with the Hawaiian government, the group changed their focus to issues of trade between Hawaii and Japan that affected issei business owners. In 1908 the organization changed its name again to the Honolulu Japanese Chamber of Commerce, and from 1916 onward they worked out of an office above the Yokohama Specie Bank branch in Honolulu.

In 1939, the Honolulu Japanese Chamber of Commerce merged with the Japanese Merchants Association (Chuo Rengo) and the Honolulu Japanese Contractors Association, and changed its name to the Japanese Chamber of Commerce and Industry.

During World War II, many Chamber members were arrested and interned either in Hawaii or on the mainland. Since many members were missing, the Chamber's activities were put on hold until 1947, when the organization reactivated.

In 1960, the Chamber built an office in Moʻiliʻili. It included a cultural hall and tea house. In 1968, the organization became an associate member of the Chamber of Commerce of Hawaii. During the 1980s there was a movement to create a cultural center to preserve Japanese American history in Hawaii. Thus, the Japanese Cultural Center of Hawaii was founded in 1987.

=== Honolulu Japanese Junior Chamber of Commerce ===
The Junior Chamber of Commerce was founded by nisei in 1949. Its creation was initially opposed by the Honolulu Chamber of Commerce because they believed that the organization's goals would run counter to the post-war "Americanization" of second-generation Japanese people.

They are associated with the United States Junior Chamber of Commerce. Much of their work is focused on community service.

== Activities ==
The Honolulu Japanese Chamber of Commerce holds many professional development and networking events throughout the year. They also hold cultural events such as their annual Shinnen Enkai New Year's Celebration. Since 1978, they have also sponsored an annual exhibition at the Honolulu Museum of Art.

=== Cherry Blossom Festival ===
The Honolulu Japanese Junior Chamber of Commerce has held an annual beauty pageant since 1953. The Cherry Blossom festival is one of the longest-running ethnic beauty pageants in Hawaii. Until 1998, contestants had to be of full Japanese descent. Considered long overdue, given that other ethnic beauty pageants had allowed mixed-race contestants for years prior, these rules were changed to reflect Hawaii's multiracial population.
