= Ryukyuan diaspora =

Ryukyuans living outside of Japan

琉球人

Total population
- 415,361

Regions with significant populations
- Brazil: 162,892
- United States: 105,670
- Peru: 71,831
- Argentina: 16,390
- Bolivia: 6,946
- Canada: 2,017
- Mexico: 1,026

Languages
- Ryukyuan languages; Japanese

Religion
- Ryukyuan religion; Shinto; Buddhism; Christianity

Related ethnic groups
- Other Ryukyuans and the Japanese diaspora

The Ryukyuan diaspora are Ryukyuan emigrants from Japan's Ryukyu Islands, especially Okinawa Island, and their descendants. The first recorded emigration of Ryukyuans was in the 15th century when they established an enclave in Fuzhou, in the Ming dynasty (China). Later, there was a large wave of emigration to Hawaii at the start of the 20th century, followed by a wave to various Pacific islands in the 1920s and multiple migrations to the Americas throughout the 20th century. Ryukyuans became Japanese citizens when Japan annexed the Ryukyu Kingdom in 1879; therefore Ryukyuan immigrants are often labeled as part of the Japanese diaspora. Regardless, some of the Ryukyuan diaspora view themselves as a distinct group from the Japanese (Yamato).

== History ==
Many people were struggling economically in the Ryukyu Islands during the late 1800s and early 1900s (Meiji era). As a result, many Ryukyuans left the islands when emigration was legalized in Japan, arriving in places such as Brazil, Peru, Hawaii and mainland Japan.

The first Ryukyuans to migrate to the United States were 26 Okinawan contract laborers led by Kyuzo Toyama. They arrived in the Territory of Hawaii on January 8, 1900, and worked on the sugar plantations there. In 2020, there were an estimated 45,000 to 50,000 Hawaiians of Ryukyuan ancestry, totaling around 3% of the state's population.

The first Japanese migrants to Brazil arrived at the port of Santos in São Paulo on June 18, 1908. Half of these migrants were Ryukyuans.

== Bibliography ==
- Ethnic Studies Oral History Project and United Okinawan Association of Hawaii. Uchinanchu: A History of Okinawans in Hawaii. Honolulu: University of Hawaii Press, 1981.
- Kerr, George. Okinawa: History of an Island People. Tokyo: Charles Tuttle Company, 2000.
- Nakasone, Ronald Y. (2002). Okinawan Diaspora. University of Hawaii Press. ISBN 978-0-8248-2530-0.
- Rabson, Steve. The Okinawan Disapora in Japan: Crossing the Borders Within. Honolulu: University of Hawaii Press, 2012.
- Suzuki, Taku. Embodying Belonging: Racializing Okinawan Diaspora in Bolivia and Japan. Honolulu: University of Hawaii Press, 2010.
