= Central Pacific Bank =

American regional commercial bank

Central Pacific Financial Corporation
- Type: Public company
- Traded as: NYSE: CPF; S&P 600 component
- Industry: Banking
- Headquarters: Honolulu, Hawaii, United States

Central Pacific Bank (CPB) is an American regional commercial bank located throughout the state of Hawaii.

CPB offers personal, business, and commercial banking services, including checking and savings accounts, loans, lines of credit, mortgages, credit cards, certificates of deposit (CDs), individual retirement accounts (IRAs), and wealth management services including insurance and trusts.

The bank focuses on supporting small businesses, providing more U.S. Small Business Administration (SBA) loans than all other Hawaii banks combined and being the first bank in the state to offer an online portal for SBA services.

Through its annual WE by Rising Tide program, cohorts of women entrepreneurs are provided education in financial management, marketing and branding, and networking opportunities over the course of a 10-week program.

Central Pacific Plaza also regularly hosts small business marketplace events in its Tidepools lobby area, providing a venue for companies to sell their products in downtown Honolulu.

== History ==
Central Pacific Bank was founded by Japanese American nisei (second generation) veterans of the 442nd Regimental Combat Team, 100th Infantry Battalion, and Military Intelligence Service, including future senator Daniel Inouye, in response to social inequities immigrant families faced after WWII.

To strengthen the project’s prospects, the group reached out to issei (first generation) business leaders, which brought them into contact with the Sumitomo Bank, a bank from Japan that had operated in Hawaii prior to WWII. They then raised $1 million in capital through grassroots efforts across the islands, and this, along with managerial assistance from Sumitomo, allowed CPB to obtain its charter on January 29,1954 and officially open for business on February 15, 1954. The opening of the bank brought with it more acceptance of the Japanese and other ethnic communities not only at other financial institutions, but also in Hawaii’s society and economy at large.

By the time Hawaii became a state in 1959, the bank operated five branches including its downtown headquarters. Throughout the 1960’s and 1970’s, CPB continued to focus on modernization and automation, growing its total assets from $6.3 million in 1954 to $410.9 million in 1979.

In 1981, construction started on a new corporate headquarters building in downtown Honolulu. It was completed in 1982, and in February 1983, CPB relocated its corporate headquarters to this new location. Technological improvements during this time period include the expansion of available ATMs in 1990 when CPB joined the ATM Plus network and the introduction of phone banking services in 1992.

In January 2020, CPB launched its RISE2020 program, with the goal of updating the main branch with an indoor-outdoor lanai, co-working spaces, and a new retail space.

During the global pandemic beginning in 2020, the bank created an online portal for Paycheck Protection Program applications, resulting in the highest market share of PPP loans dispersed by any bank in any state in the U.S.

In 2021, CPB launched Shaka Checking, Hawaii’s first all-digital checking account and became the first Hawaii bank to offer a live chat feature with customer service representatives.

In 2025, CPB donated its former Operations Center located on School Street to the City and County of Honolulu, Department of Community Services (DCS). The total donation was valued at more than $1.6 million.

== Philanthropy ==
In 2007, the bank created the CPB Foundation, the philanthropic arm of Central Pacific Bank, to create opportunities for Hawaii’s youth and support social progress. Since its inception, the foundation has donated millions of dollars to numerous organizations statewide.

== Central Pacific Financial Corporation ==
Central Pacific Financial Corp. is a Hawaii-based bank holding company with approximately $7.42 billion in assets as of Sept. 30, 2025. Central Pacific Financial Corp. is traded on the New York Stock Exchange (NYSE) under the symbol “CPF.”
