= Kuakini Medical Center =

Geography
- Location: Oahu, Hawaii, United States
- Coordinates: 21°19′19″N 157°51′25″W

Organization
- Type: Private Hospital

Services
- Beds: 140

History
- Opened: 1892

Links
- Website: www.kuakini.org/wps/portal/
- Lists: Hospitals in Hawaii

Kuakini Medical Center is a private hospital in Honolulu, Hawaii. The center is run by the Kuakini Health System which also runs geriatric care facilities and a foundation.

== History ==
The organization started as the Japanese Benevolent Society in 1892 and was incorporated in 1899. The first Japanese Charity Hospital opened in 1900 and expanded in 1902. A larger facility was built in 1917 at the present site with donations from Emperor Taishō of Japan. In 1934 Emperor Hirohito of Japan donated funds for more expansion. After the attack on Pearl Harbor in 1941, the US military occupied the hospital during World War II and renamed it Kuakini Medical Center, after the street. The street was in turn named for John Adams Kuakini (1791–1844) who was acting Governor of Oahu in the 1830s. In 1945 the hospital returned to civil control. The hospital went from caring and supporting the Japanese immigrants to assisting and offering health care services to the whole community. Switching from caring for just Japanese immigrants to the entire community, meant that the hospital needed better facilities to provide adequate patient care. The hospital's Ewa wing and Waikiki wing had their construction financed by a major fundraising drive in 1951; Increasing the bed count of Kuakini to 140 beds.
