= Hawaii Shingon Mission =

- Shingon Shu Hawaii
- U.S. National Register of Historic Places
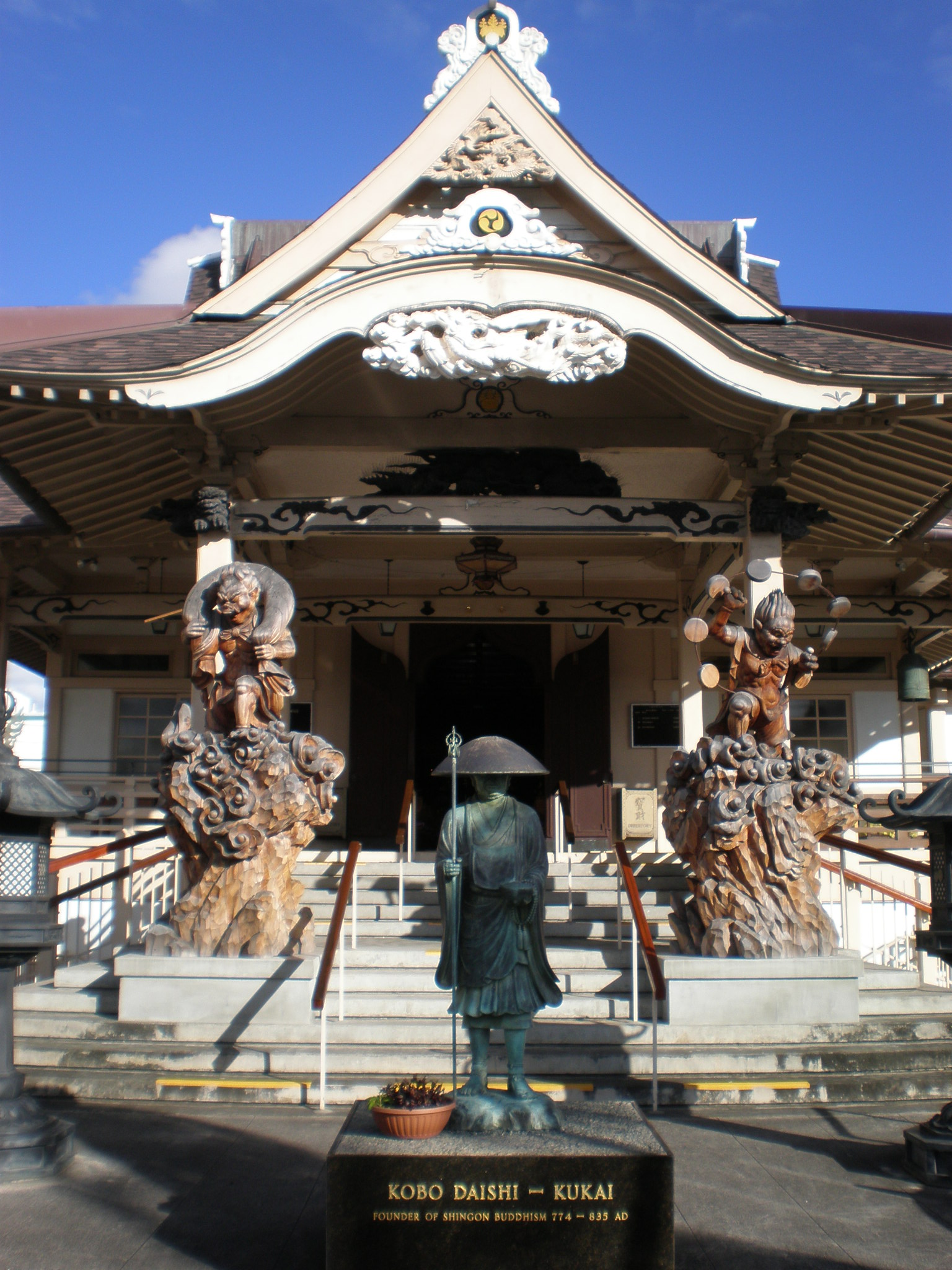

- Location within Hawaii
- Nearest city: Honolulu, Hawaii
- Coordinates: 21°17′5″N 157°50′57″W
- Area: less than one acre
- Built: 1918, 1929
- Architect: Hego Fuchino
- Architectural style: Japanese
- NRHP reference No.: 02000386
- Added to NRHP: April 26, 2002

Hawaii Shingon Mission or Shingon Shu Hawaii (Japanese: 真言宗ハワイ別院, Shingonshu Hawai Betsuin, formerly the Shingon Sect Mission of Hawaii) located at 915 Sheridan Street in Honolulu, Hawaiʻi is one of the most elaborate displays of Japanese Buddhist temple architecture in Hawaiʻi. It was first built in 1915-1918 by Nakagawa Katsutaro, a master builder of Japanese-style temples, then renovated in 1929 by Hego Fuchino, a self-taught man who was the first person of Japanese ancestry to become a licensed architect in the Islands. The building underwent further changes in 1978, and was considerably augmented in 1992. However, its most distinctive features remain: the steep, hipped-gable roof (irimoya) with rounded-gable projection, both with elaborate carvings on the ends, and the glittering altar and interior furnishings from Japan that signify its ties to esoteric Shingon Buddhism.

The temple was added to the National Register of Historic Places on 26 April 2002.

== History ==
The round tomoe at the top of the entrance roof represents the cycle of life. It is also the traditional symbol of the Koyasan Shingon sect, though the temple has been independent of sectarian affiliations since 2004. The carved phoenix represents death and rebirth, and the carved dragons represent both power and good fortune. The obelisk at the front edge of the property commemorates the first Shingon pilgrimage to Japan by immigrants in Hawaii in 1929. The more recently added statue in front depicts Kōbō Daishi (Kūkai, 774-835 CE), the founder of Shingon. An oil painting of the Daishi by a member, Mrs. Helen Nakagawa Abe, of the local congregation also graces the altar inside the temple. The temple is congregational, and reflects the diversity of Hawaii in its membership.

In 2009, the temple added a worship service in English, and planned on a slow transition to primarily English services.

The Shingon Shu Hawaii temple commissioned the creation of a ceiling panel (tenjo-e) that depicts the Taizokai mandala which measures 600 square feet (56 m^{2}). Done in original pigments mixed by Japanese artisans and suspended in animal fat, the pigments were applied to individually lacquered (urushi) panels, then placed by hand into a grid suspended from the ceiling. In 2007 the arrival of Fujin (Wind God) and Raijin (Thunder God) statues, completed the second phase of the temple's artistic additions. The statues which can be seen at the immediate entrance of the main hall were chosen to depict the Hawaiian prevailing trade winds with Fujin, and an appreciation for the power and force of nature in Raijin. Each stand over ten feet in height, and weigh over 2800 pounds a piece. Constructed of Japanese Cypress, they are the largest depictions of the Wind and Thunder Gods outside Japan.

== Gallery ==
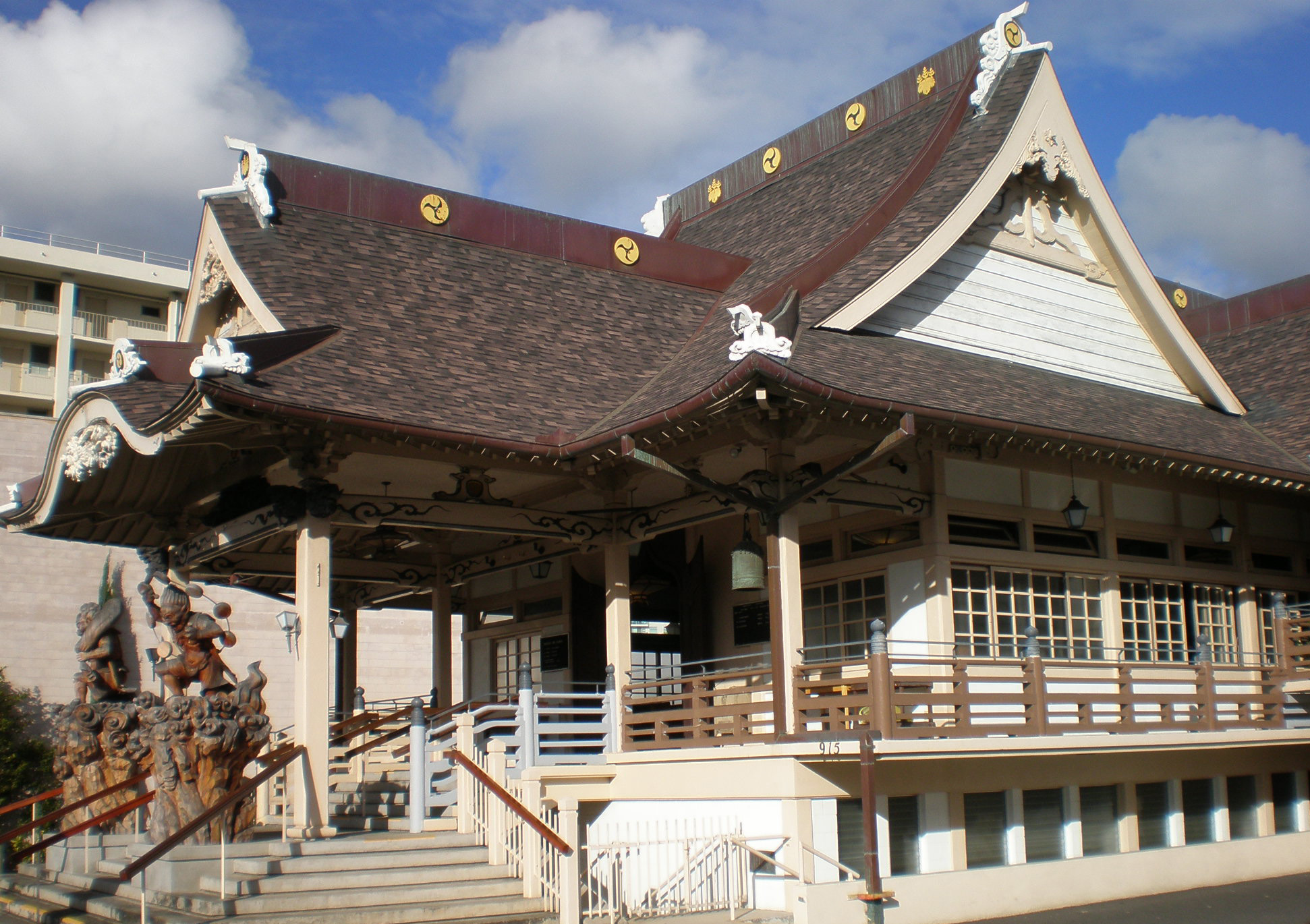
Side view of main building

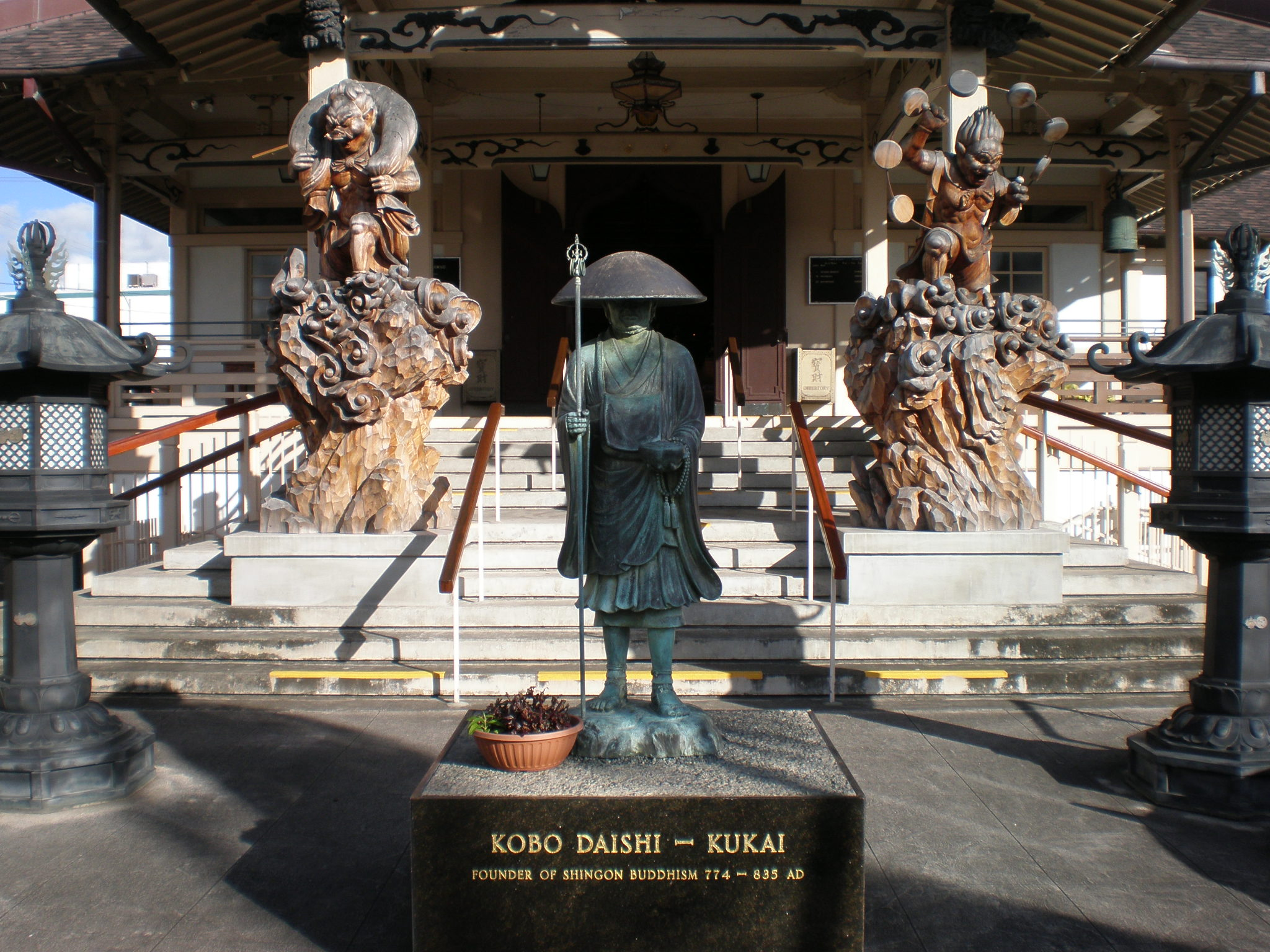
Lanterns, deities Fujin (left) Raijin (right), and statue of founder Kobo Daishi

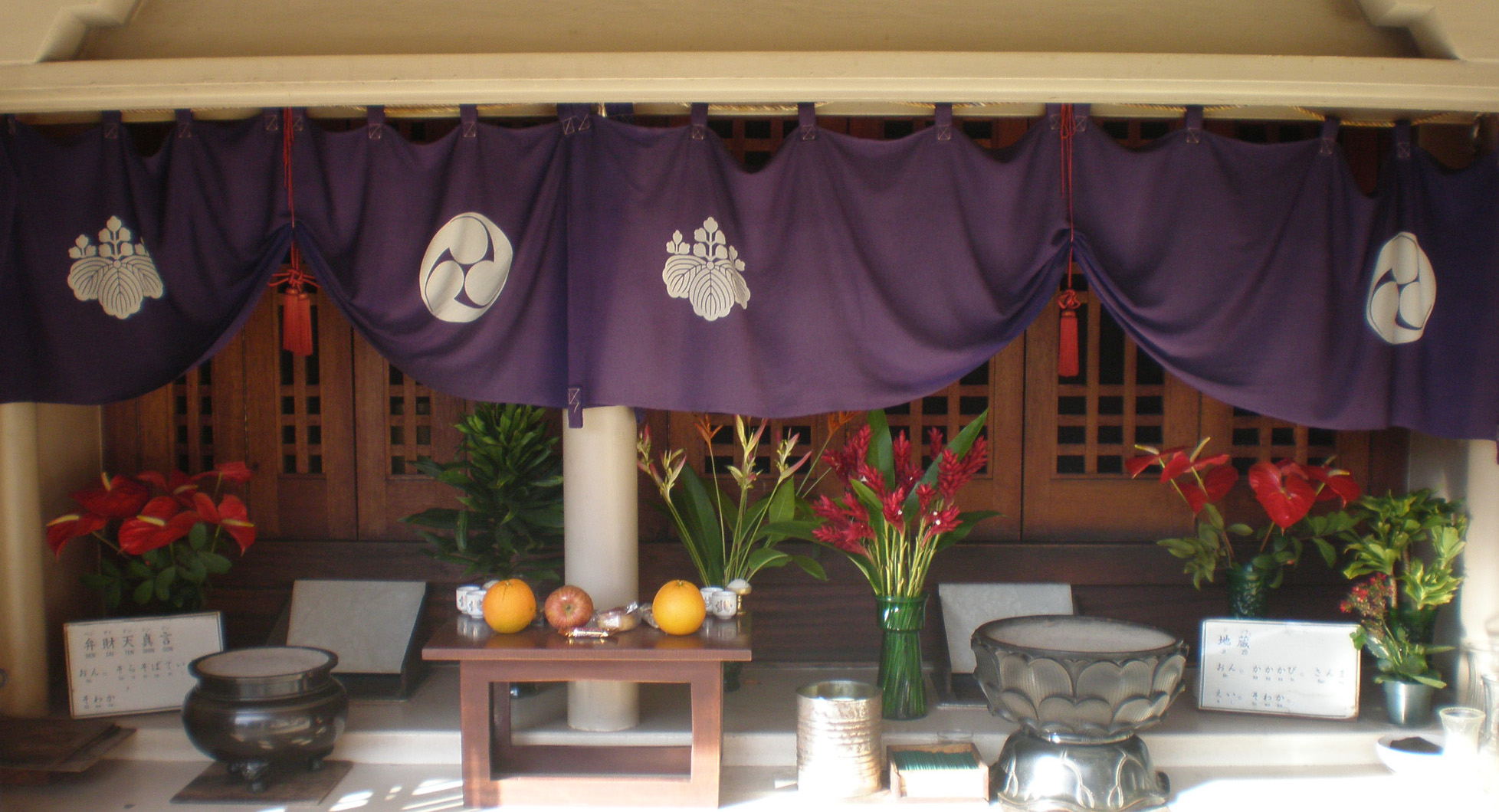
Outside altar

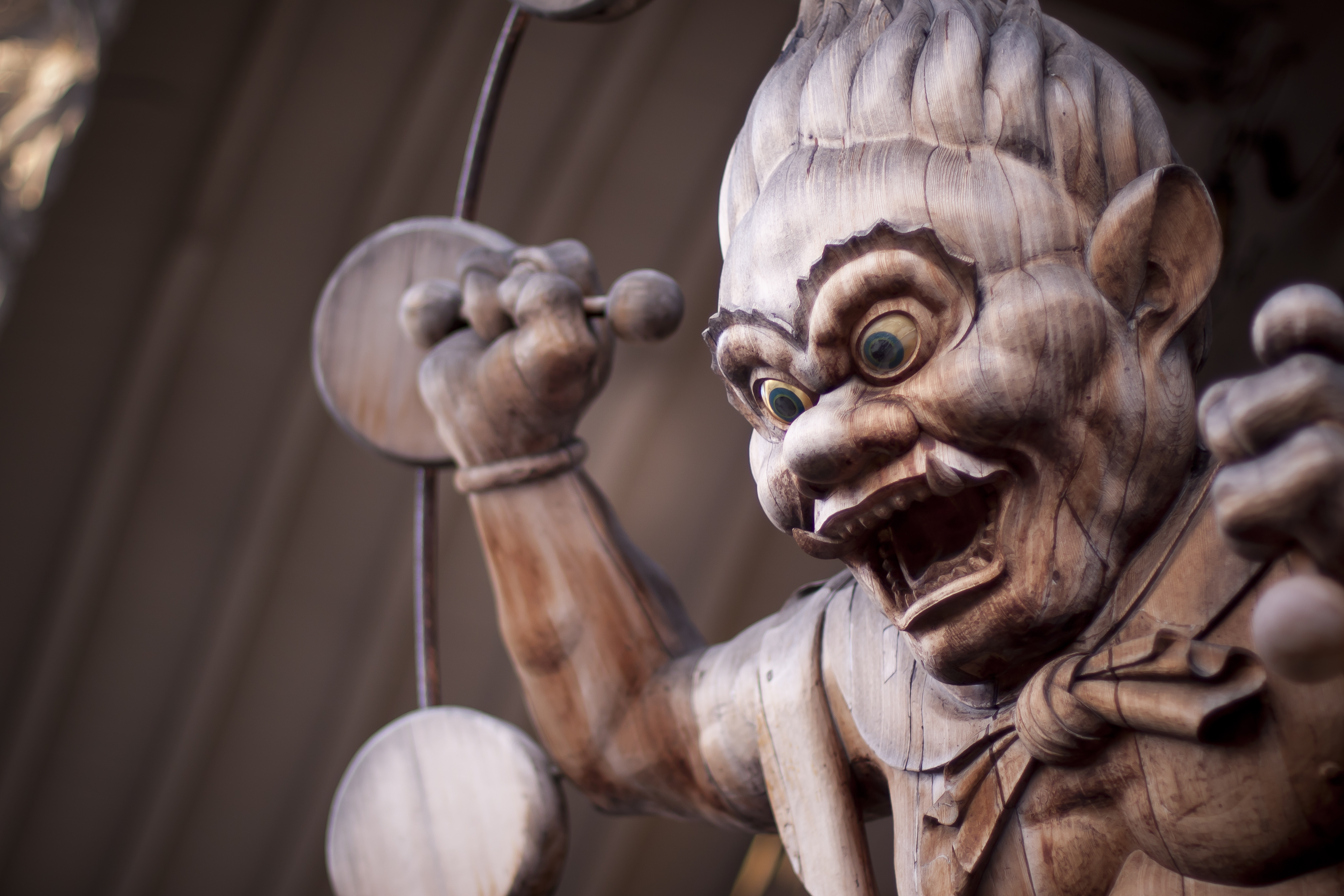
Raijin

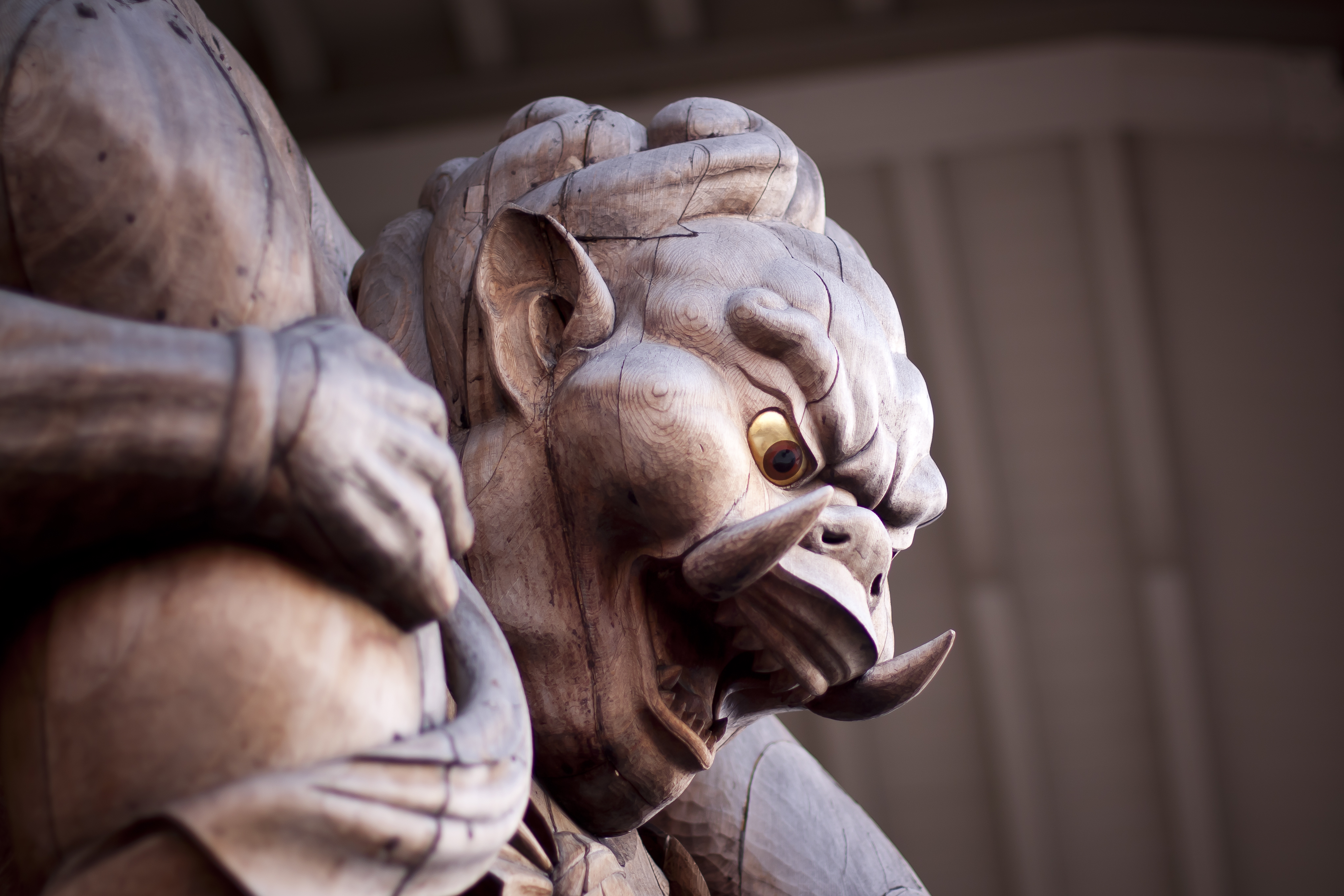
Fujin

== See also ==
- Byodo-In Temple (non-denominational), Kaneohe
- Broken Ridge Buddhist Temple (Korean Buddhism), Honolulu
- Daifukuji Soto Zen Mission (Zen Buddhism), Honalo
- Honpa Hongwanji Mission of Hawaii (Jodo Shinshu Buddhism), Honolulu
- Hsu Yun Temple (Chinese Buddhism), Honolulu
- Jodo Mission of Hawaii (Jodo-shu Buddhism), Honolulu
