= Honpa Hongwanji Mission of Hawaii =

Hongan-ji district in Hawaii

The Honpa Hongwanji Mission of Hawaii (Japanese: 本派本願寺ハワイ別院, Honpa Honganji Hawai Betsuin) is a district of the Nishi (West) Hongwanji branch of Jodo Shinshu Buddhism, a school of Mahayana Pure Land Buddhism.

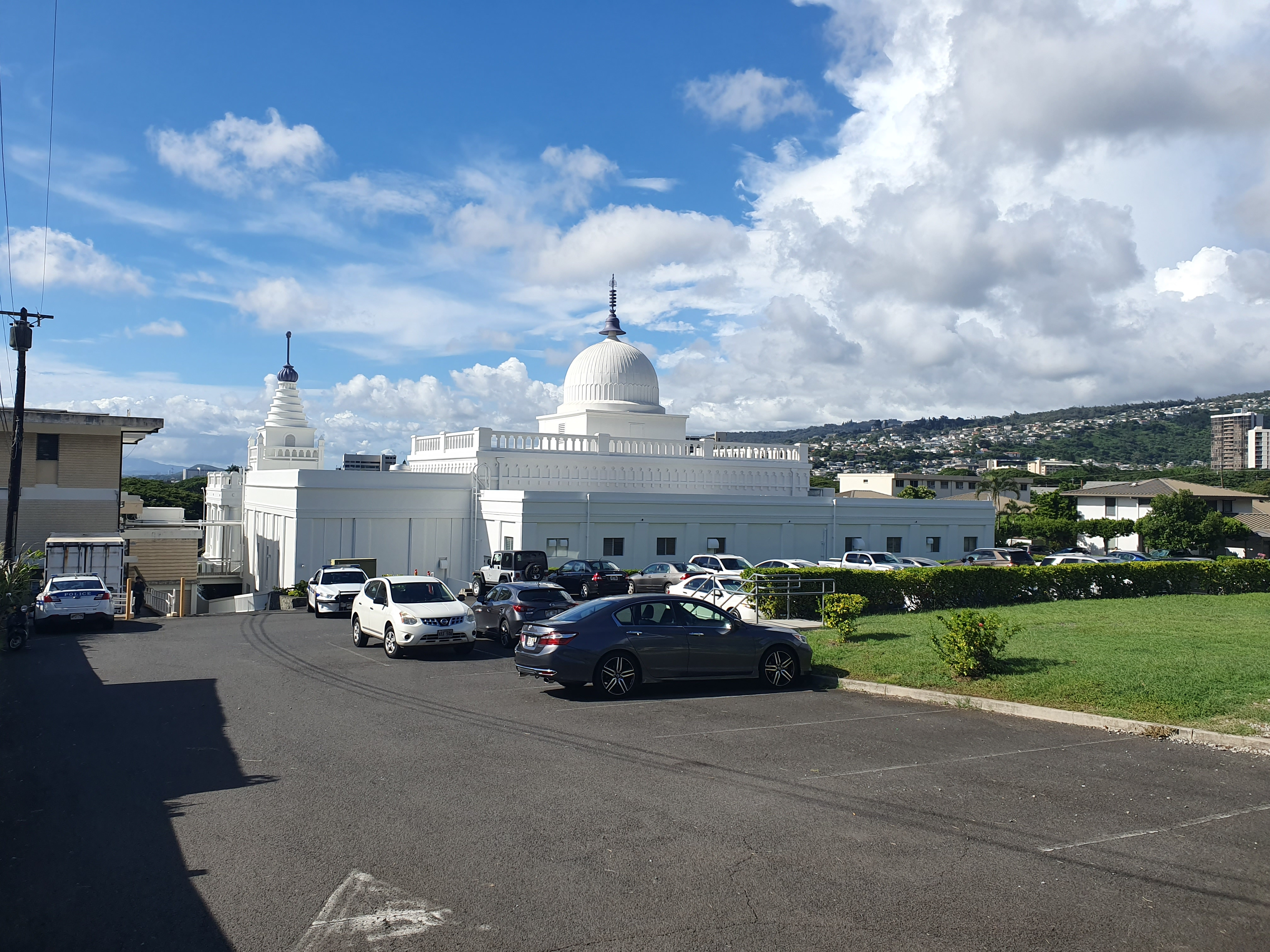
Branch location in Honolulu

== History ==
Jodo Shinshu Buddhism was established in Hawaii as a result of the immigration of Japanese people to work the sugarcane plantations in Hawaii. The first Hongwanji temple in the Hawaiian Islands was dedicated on March 3, 1889. In 1897, the Nishi Hongwanji in Kyoto, Japan began sending official ministers to establish temples for Japanese immigrants in Hawaii and the mainland United States. The first was Kenjun Miyamoto, who laid the groundwork for the ministry. Honi Satomi was the first priest, serving from 1898 until 1900, when he returned to Japan. Yemyo Imamura took over for Satomi in 1900, and served until his death in 1932. Chikai Yosemori was the bishop of the Honpa Hongwanji Bestuin Temple and served as a minister until his retirement in 2007.

Since these early days, 36 temples have been established across the Hawaiian Islands, including the Honpa Hongwanji Hawaii Betsuin and the Honpa Hongwanji Hilo Betsuin. The mission operates the Hongwanji Mission School and Pacific Buddhist Academy, making it the largest Buddhist sect in Hawaii in 2007. It is administered separately from the Buddhist Churches of America, the umbrella organization of Jodo Shinshu temples in the continental United States.

In 1976, insurance executive Paul Yamanaka went to Yoshiaki Fujitani, Bishop of the Mission, with the idea to create a program called "Living Treasures of Hawaiʻi" modeled after the Living National Treasures program of Japan. The purpose of the award is to recognize and honor persons who have demonstrated excellence and high standards of achievement in their particular fields of endeavor and have made significant contributions to humanity toward a more fraternal society. Any person can nominate an individual for the award. This program has honored more than 100 community members to date.

== Locations ==
Headquarters of the Honpa Hongwanji Mission of Hawaii are located in Honolulu. The following is a list of the organization's affiliated temples.

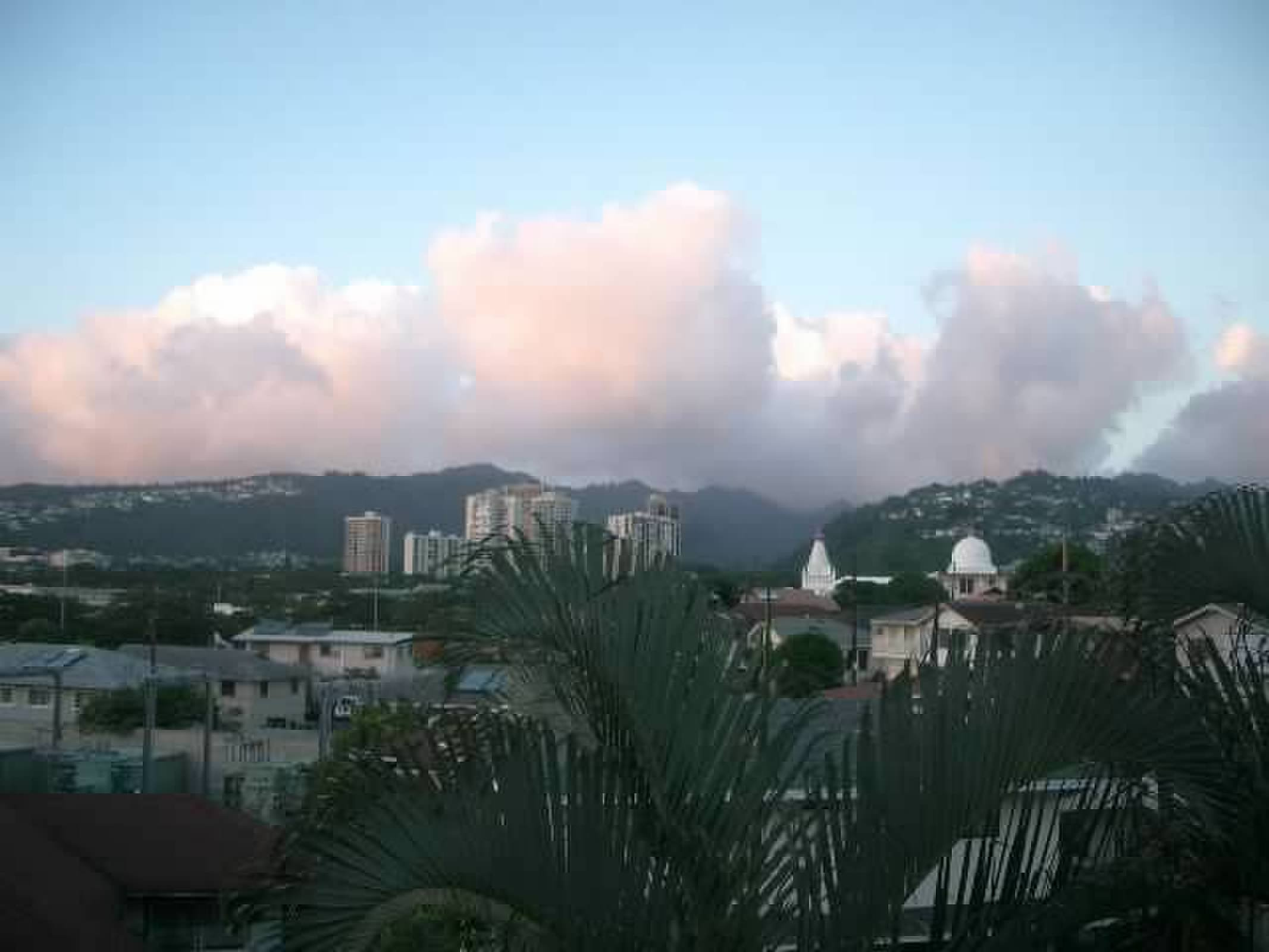
Skyline with the iconic Honpa Hongwanji Hawaii Betsuin (Honolulu, Oahu) in the center right

- Honpa Hongwanji Hawaii Betsuin, Honolulu
- Honpa Hongwanji Hilo Betsuin, Hilo
- Pacific Buddhist Academy, Honolulu
- Hongwanji Mission School, Honolulu
- Buddhist Study Center, Honolulu

=== Oahu ===
- Aiea Hongwanji Mission, ʻAiea
- Ewa Hongwanji Mission, ʻEwa
- Jikoen Hongwanji Mission, Honolulu
- Windward Buddhist Temple (Kailua Hongwanji Mission), Kailua
- Mililani Hongwanji Mission, Mililani
- Moiliili Hongwanji Mission, Honolulu
- Pearl City Hongwanji Mission, Pearl City
- Wahiawa Hongwanji Mission, Wahiawā
- Waialua Hongwanji Mission, Waialua
- Waianae Hongwanji Mission, Waiʻanae
- Waipahu Hongwanji Mission, Waipahu

=== Hawaii (Big Island) ===
- Honohina Hongwanji Mission, Nīnole
- Honokaa Hongwanji Mission, Honokaʻa
- Honomu Hongwanji Mission, Honomū
- Kamuela Hongwanji Mission, Kamuela
- Kohala Hongwanji Mission, Kapaʻau
- Kona Hongwanji Mission, Kealakekua
- Naalehu Hongwanji Mission, Nāʻālehu
- Paauilo Hongwanji Mission, Paʻauilo
- Pahala Hongwanji Mission, Pahala
- Papaaloa Hongwanji Mission, Pāpaʻaloa
- Papaikou Hongwanji Mission, Pāpaʻikou
- Puna Hongwanji Mission, Keaʻau

=== Maui ===
- Kahului Hongwanji Mission, Kahului
- Lahaina Hongwanji Mission, Lāhainā (destroyed)
- Makawao Hongwanji Mission, Makawao
- Wailuku Hongwanji Mission, Wailuku
- Lanai Hongwanji Mission, Lānaʻi City

=== Kauai ===
- Hanapepe Hongwanji Mission, Hanapēpē
- Kapaa Hongwanji Mission, Kapaʻa
- Lihue Hongwanji Mission, Līhuʻe
- Waimea Hongwanji Mission, Waimea

== See also ==
- Buddhist Churches of America
- Jodo Shinshu Buddhist Temples of Canada
- South America Hongwanji Mission
- Jodo Mission of Hawaii
- Byodo-In Temple (non-denominational), Kaneohe
- Broken Ridge Buddhist Temple (Korean Buddhism), Honolulu
- Daifukuji Soto Zen Mission (Zen Buddhism), Honalo
- Hawaii Shingon Mission (Shingon Buddhism), Hilo
- Hsu Yun Temple (Chinese Buddhism), Honolulu
- Koyasan Shingon Mission of Hawaii (Shingon Buddhism), Hilo
