= Hsu Yun Temple =

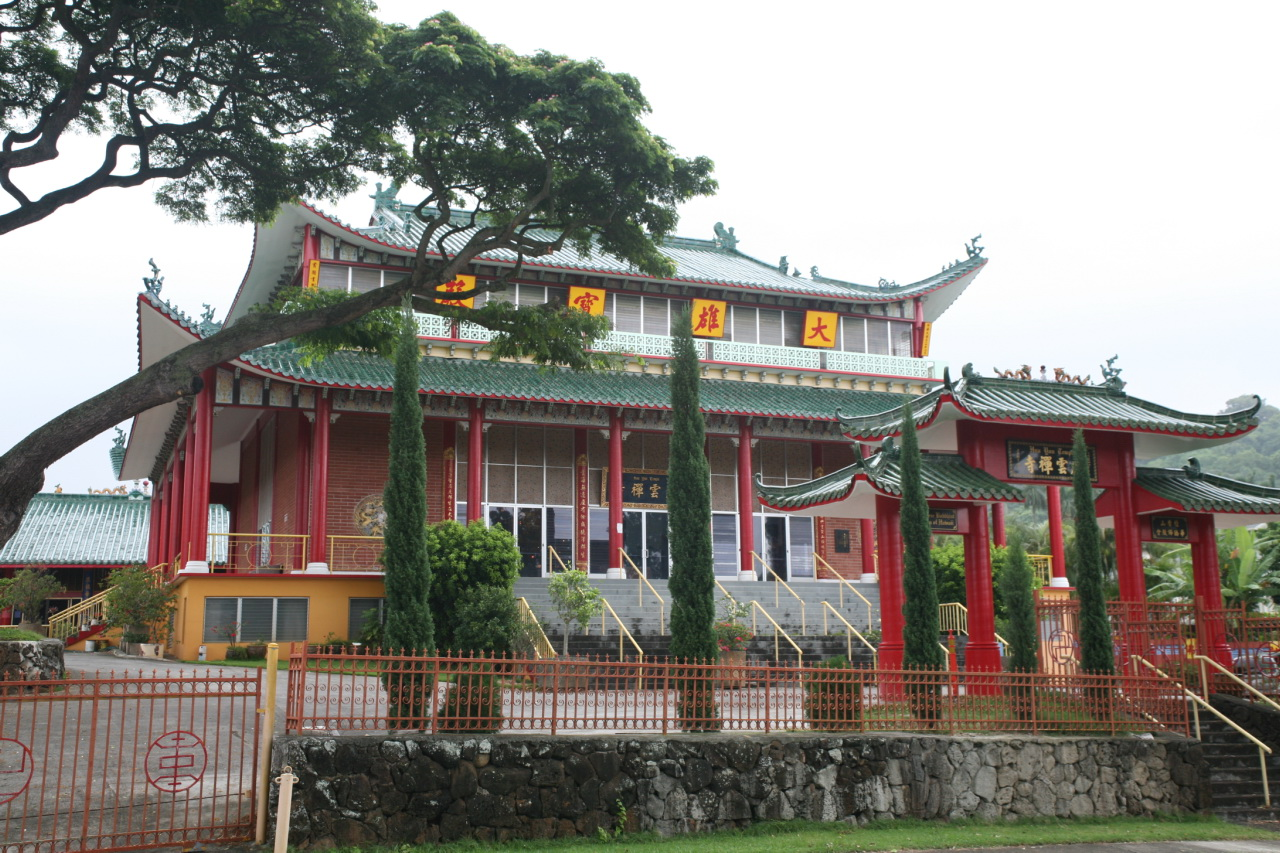
Hsu Yun Temple (2854539040)

Hsu Yun Temple (also Xuyun; 虛雲禪寺 (traditional Chinese); 虚云禅寺 (simplified Chinese); is a temple of the Xuyun branch of the Linji school of Chán (Mahayana) Buddhism in Honolulu, Hawaii.

Jy Ding standing in front of Hsu Yun Temple.

== History ==
Hsu Yun Temple is claimed to be Hawaii's (possibly the western world's) very first Chinese Buddhist Hall. There is also putative claim that it was, on construction, the largest Chinese Temple in the history of the Americas (6,000 sq ft).

Linji Chán (Chinese) Buddhism was established in Hawaii as a result of Jy Ding (Jy Din or Zhi Ding, Wei Miao Shì Jy Dìng, 唯秒 釋 智定, 1917-2003) being sent to the West by his Zen Master Xuyun in 1956. He was part of the group of Xuyun Dharma disciples who were pushed by their master to leave China shortly before the Communist takeover in 1949. Jy Ding lived in Hong Kong before moving to Honolulu.

Jy Ding started building the Hsu Yun Temple in the same year. Construction of the 'great hall' part of this temple, overseen by Jy Ding, began in 1964 and finished three years later, in 1967. The full temple complex, which was constructed over ten years, was sanctioned at a ceremony on November 8, 1997, at which Jy Ding, presiding as founder and abbot also created the Zen Buddhist Order of HsuYun and named Chuan Zhi Shakya as the Orders first Abbot, someone born in Indiana. The architect was the American-Chinese William P. Au.

== Description ==
The temple is distinguished from the neighboring Japanese temples due to its bolder colors. The interior features a double-sided altar with gold-trimmed grillwork.

The Hsu Yun Temple is located at 42 Kawananakoa Pl in Liliha-Kapalama - Honolulu.

== See also ==
- Byodo-In Temple (non-denominational), Kaneohe
- Broken Ridge Buddhist Temple (Korean Buddhism), Honolulu
- Daifukuji Soto Zen Mission (Zen Buddhism), Honalo
- Hawaii Shingon Mission (Shingon Buddhism), Hilo
- Honpa Hongwanji Mission of Hawaii (Jōdo Shinshū), Honolulu
- Jodo Mission of Hawaii (Jodo-shu Buddhism), Honolulu
- http://www.hsuyun.org/index.html
- Pictures of Jy Ding with Xuyun
