= Daifukuji Soto Zen Mission =

Zen Buddhist temple on the island of Hawaiʻi

- U.S. National Register of Historic Places
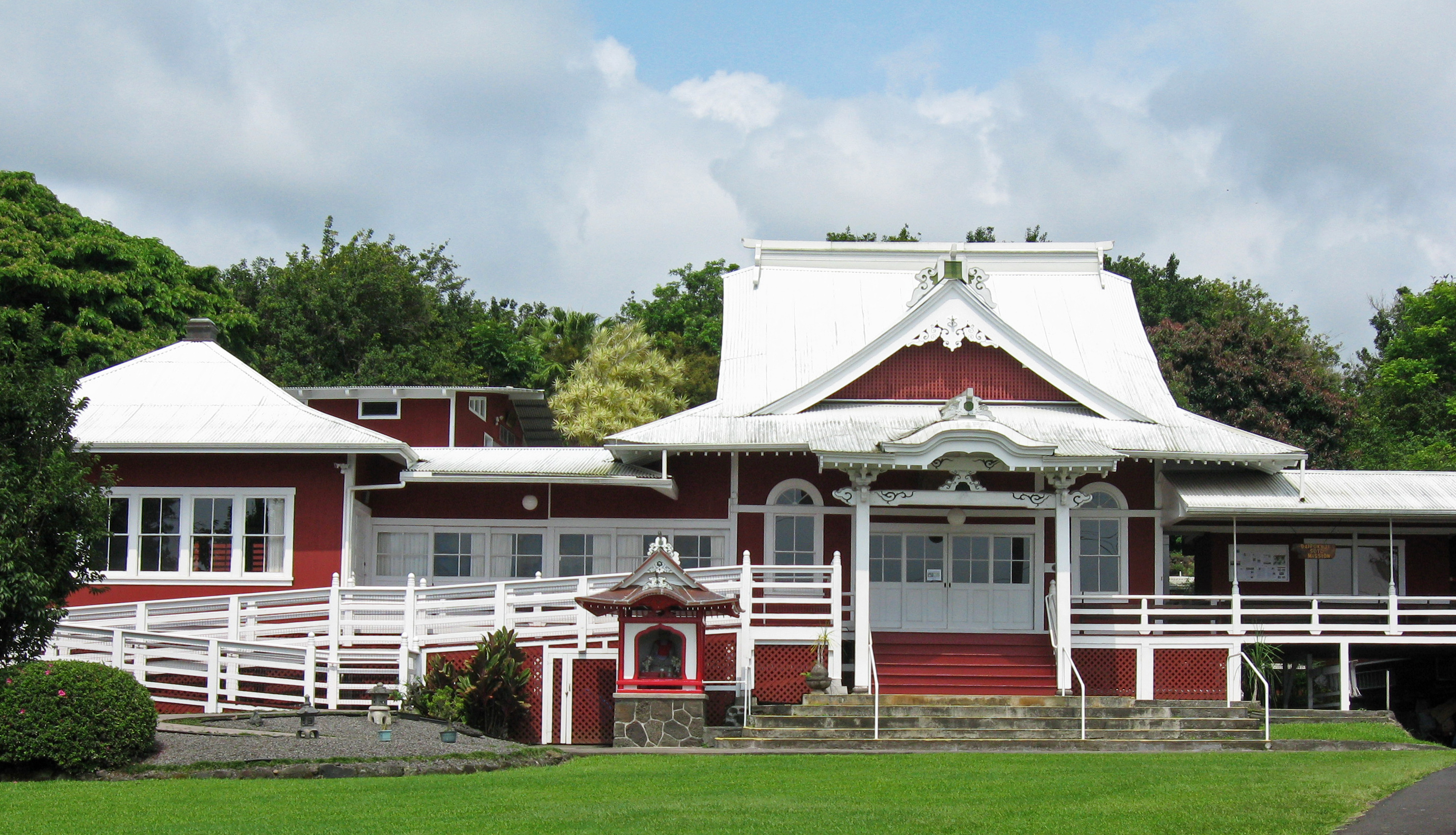

- Location within Hawaii
- Location: Mamalahoa Highway, Honalo, Hawaii
- Coordinates: 19°32′32″N 155°55′41″W
- Area: less than one acre
- Built: 1921
- Architect: Yoshisuke Sasaki
- NRHP reference No.: 94000382
- Added to NRHP: April 21, 1994

The Daifukuji Sōtō Mission (Japanese: 大福寺) is a Zen Buddhist temple on the island of Hawaiʻi established in 1914 .

== History ==
In 1914 Reverend Kaiseki Kodama arrived in Kona and held services at the former Hanato Store which was located across the street from the present temple. He walked around the entire island twice in order to collect donations to build a temple. In 1915, the first temple, a small thatched structure was built a few hundred yards above and to the north of the present site. It was named Hakuhozan Daifukuji ("Temple of Great Happiness on White Mountain Peak") by the Zen abbots of Sōtō temples Eihei-ji and Sōji-ji in Japan. The site is in the area known as Honalo, Hawaii in the Kona district on the western slopes of Mauna Loa. Although "white mountain" is a translation in the Hawaiian language of the name Mauna Kea, the other main peak on the island of Hawaiʻi, snow often covers Mauna Loa in winter as well.

Reverend Kaiseki Kodama arrived in 1918 and started construction of the current temple in 1920. On May 27, 1921, a Buddha image was enshrined in the main hall in a dedication ceremony. The temple is a blend of traditional Japanese architectural forms adapted to local Hawaiian building methods. It was designed by first-generation immigrant (Issei) Yoshisuke Sasaki who owned a store nearby in Keauhou, and constructed by head carpenter Teruyoshi Ikenouchi and others. Over the next few years living quarters were added, and a Japanese language school added in 1926, under the third minister, Giko Kanbara and his wife Shigeko Kanbara.

The roof has the traditional Japanese temple style of decorated gable roof called Irimoya. Enshrined in the main hall is an image of the historical Gautama Buddha. To the right is the seated figure of Dōgen and to the left is Keizan, founders of the Sōtō Zen tradition. An alcove to the right of the main altar has two more figures: Bodai Daruma Daishi (Bodhidharma), who carried teachings from India to China, and Daigen Shuri Bosatsu, another bodhisattva. The Kannon Hall was added in 1937 with an image of Kannon (Guan Yin), the bodhisattva of great compassion, sculpted by Sosaku Miki. To her right and left are 33 smaller Kannon statuettes, representing various manifestations of compassion. A small cemetery lies uphill from the temple. Although the interior has been remodeled at various times, the original sculptures (including one from 1915) and acacia koa wood altar remain.

After the attack on Pearl Harbor in 1941 the temple was shut down. Reverend Hozui Nakayama, the minister at the temple was arrested and sent to the mainland as part of the Japanese American internment. The US Army occupied the site, but allowed lay members of the community to hold funeral services. After World War II, the temple was re-opened in February 1946. A minister's house was added about 1950. A small shrine on the steps leading to the temple with a statue of Jizō (Ksitigarbha) dedicated on May 25, 1961. It was added as site 10-47-7222 to the state of Hawaii registry of historic places on March 9, 1991. It was added as site 94000382 on April 21, 1994 to the National Register of Historic Places listings on the island of Hawaii.

The temple became the center of Japanese immigrant society in the Kona area in the 20th century. A store built just south of the mission by the Teshima family in 1929 became a restaurant in the 1940s. Shizuko Teshima still owned the restaurant in 2009 when she celebrated her 102nd birthday. It is located at address 79-7241 Mamalahoa Highway (state route 11) on the Kona Heritage Corridor.

== See also ==
- Byodo-In Temple
- Broken Ridge Buddhist Temple
- Hawaii Shingon Mission
- Honpa Hongwanji Mission of Hawai'i
- Hsu Yun Temple
- Jodo Mission of Hawaii
