= Aiko Fujitani =

Japanese religious leader in Hawaii

- Born: 6 January 1902; Japan
- Died: 11 February 1965 (aged 63)
- Occupation: Educationalist
- Years active: Founder of Hongwanji Mission School

Aiko Fujitani (Japanese: 藤谷 愛子, January 6, 1902 – February 11, 1965) was a Japanese religious leader in Hawaii. She founded the Hongwanji Mission School.

== Early life ==
Fujitani was born Aiko Furukawa in Toyama prefecture on January 6, 1902. Her parents were masseurs. They moved to Hawaii in 1906 to start a business in Lihue. Her parents decided to send her to high school in Honolulu, and put her in the care of Yemyo and Kiyoko Imamura, who ran the Honpa Hongwanji Mission of Hawaii. Fujitani hoped to be certified as a teacher, but was not allowed to because she had to be a citizen to earn a teaching certificate. The Naturalization Act prevented her from becoming a citizen. Instead, she studied at the Phillips Commercial School, where she learned typing, shorthand, and bookkeeping. She also attended the Hawaii Koto Jogakko, a girls' school operated by the Honpa Hongwanji. She graduated in 1918.

== Career ==
Fujitani married Kodo Fujitani in 1921. Kodo was a Shin Buddhist minister who had recently arrived in Hawaii. They moved to Maui and served at the Pauwela Hongwanji Mission. They had eight children, with one of their sons also serving as a Buddhist minister in adulthood. While serving in Pauwela, Fujitani was also regularly called upon by the county to serve as an interpreter, foster parent to orphans, and substitute teacher.

In 1935 the family moved to Moiliili Hongwanji, where Fujitani directed the Sunday School and the temple dormitory. When Kodo was incarcerated throughout World War II, Fujitani maintained the temple and its activities. She also encouraged women to support the Red Cross throughout the war.

She was also a member of the Moiliili Community Center, and became an executive board member when it was officially chartered in 1945. Fujitani founded the Hongwanji Mission School during her husband's tenure as bishop in 1949. It was the first Buddhist elementary school that taught in English in the United States. However, though she founded the school and served as the executive secretary of the board, she never taught there.

The Fujitanis returned to Maui to serve at the Wailuku Hongwanji Mission until 1959, when they retired and returned to Honolulu. Fujitani died of coronary thrombosis on February 11, 1965.
