= Alfred Bloom (Buddhist) =

American Buddhist scholar (1926–2017)

- Born: November 9, 1926; Philadelphia, Pennsylvania
- Died: August 25, 2017 (aged 90); Honolulu, Hawaii
- Citizenship: United States
- Education: Ph.D.
- Alma mater: Harvard Divinity School
- Occupations: Author and professor
- Spouse: Dorothy N. Bloom
- Writing career
- Period: 1963
- Genre: Comparative Religious Studies
- Subjects: Shin Buddhism and Religious Studies
- Notable work: Shinran's Gospel of Pure Grace

Alfred Bloom (November 9, 1926 – August 25, 2017) was an American Shin Buddhism scholar, who pioneered Jōdo Shinshū studies in the English-speaking world.

== Early life and education ==
Born on November 9, 1926, in Philadelphia, Pennsylvania, Bloom was the youngest child of Jewish parents. At the time of Bloom’s birth, his mother had been a recent convert to an Evangelical tradition of Christianity, and he was raised in that religious setting.

After graduating from Germantown High School in 1944, he joined the United States Army. He was sent first to Virginia Military Institute and then Basic Training, after which he was assigned to the University of Pennsylvania for a nine-month program in Japanese language.

In 1946, Bloom was deployed to Japan, serving in the Allied Translator and Interpreter Service. During this time, he promoted Evangelical Christianity and encountered the concept of Amida Buddha when a Christian minister explained a passage from the Christian scriptures by using Amida Buddha as an analogy. This sparked a lifelong interest that grew from curiosity to academic pursuit to personal faith, always through rigorous intellectual reflection and dialogue.

Alfred Bloom died on August 25, 2017, at St. Francis Hospice in Honolulu, Hawaii, aged 90.

== Career ==
Bloom began his academic life at Eastern Baptist Theological Seminary (BA., Th.B.) from 1947 to 1951. During this time he began to question, and then to abandon, the fundamentalist approach to the Bible which he had previously held.

He completed his theological training at Andover Newton Theological School (B.D., S.T.M.) in Newton, Massachusetts, in 1953. While in seminary, he was encouraged to pursue his intellectual interests in the newly founded degree of Comparative Religious Studies at Harvard Divinity School. He received a Fulbright grant to study in Japan (1957-1959) and was awarded his doctorate from Harvard Divinity School with his thesis "Shinran’s Gospel of Pure Grace" in 1963.

From 1959 to 1961, Bloom was proctor for Center for the Study of World Religions, Harvard Divinity School, and Teaching Fellow in History of Religion, Harvard Divinity School. For a time, in 1961, he was lecturer in the History of Religion at Newton Junior College in Newton, Massachusetts.

Bloom taught as a professor of Religion at the University of Oregon from 1961 to 1970, University of Hawaii at Manoa from 1970 to 1986, and the Institute of Buddhist Studies where he served as Dean from 1986 to 1994.

Bloom became an active member of the Hawaii Betsuin in the 1970s and received Shin Buddhist ordination, Tokudo (1990) and Kaikyoshi (1994). He was given the posthumous title Ko-Toku-In Shaku Zen-Kyo.

Bloom was instrumental in establishing the Hawaii Buddhist Study Center; founded the Futaba Memorial Lectures; and supported the founding of the Pacific Buddhist Academy. He received the Buddhist Promotion Society Award (1997), Living Treasures of Hawaii Award from the Honpa Hongwanji Mission of Hawaii (2002), and the 3rd Annual President's Award from the Institute of Buddhist Studies (2016).

== Bibliography ==
- The Shin Buddhist Classical Tradition: A Reader in Pure Land Teachings, Vols 1 & 2, (World Wisdom, 2013 & 2014) ISBN 978-1-936597-27-7 (Vol 1), ISBN 978-1-936597-38-3 (Vol 2)
- The Essential Shinran: A Buddhist Path of True Entrusting, (World Wisdom, 2007) ISBN 978-1-933316-21-5
- Living in Amida's Universal Vow: Essays on Shin Buddhism, (World Wisdom, 2004) ISBN 978-0-941532-54-9
- Honen the Buddhist Saint: Essential Writings and Official Biography, (World Wisdom, 2006)[introduction] ISBN 978-1-933316-13-0
- A life of serendipity : blown by the wind of Amida's vow, (American Buddhist Study Center, 2008) ISBN 978-0-9764594-1-5
- Yemyo Imamura: Pioneer American Buddhist (A Dharma Outreach of Honpa Honwanji Mission of Hawaii), (Buddhist Study Center Press, 2000) ISBN 0-938474-21-9
- Religion & Man: Indian and Far Eastern Religious Traditions, (McGraw-Hill, 1998) ISBN 978-0-07-366154-4
- Strategies for Modern Living, (Heian International, 1993) ISBN 978-0-9625618-1-8
- Shoshinge: The Heart of Shin Buddhism, (Honpa Hongwanji Mission of Hawaii, 1986) ISBN 978-0-938474-06-7
- Tannisho: A Resource for Modern Living, (Buddhist Study Center Press, 1981) ISBN 978-0-938474-00-5
- Shinran's Gospel of Pure Grace, (University of Arizona Press, 1965)
- The Life of Shinran: A Journey to self acceptance, (Brill, 1968)

== Titles ==
Professor Emeritus, University of Hawaii; Dean Emeritus, Institute of Buddhist Studies, Berkeley, California; Institute of Buddhist Studies Scholar of Jodo Shinshu Studies; Jodo Shinshu priest: ordained at Jodo Shinshu Hongwanji-ha, Kyoto; Posthumous title: Ko-Toku-In Shaku Zen-Kyo.
