= Byodo-In =

Byodo-In may refer to:

- Byōdō-in, a Buddhist temple in the city of Uji in Kyoto Prefecture, Japan
- Byodo-In (Hawaii), a Buddhist temple on the island of Oʻahu in the State of Hawaiʻi, United States
