= Jiro Okabe =

Japanese politician

- 岡部 次郎
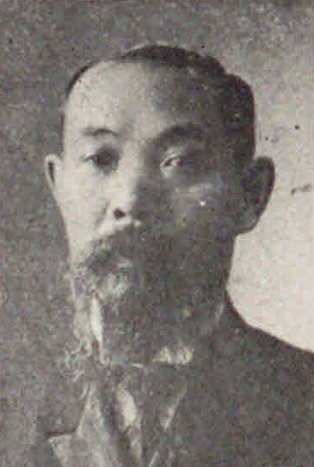

Member of the House of Representatives
- In office 10 May 1924 – 8 July 1925
- Preceded by: Satō Toratarō
- Succeeded by: Shinohara Waichi
- Constituency: Nagano 9th
- In office 15 May 1912 – 26 February 1920
- Preceded by: Multi-member district
- Succeeded by: Constituency abolished
- Constituency: Nagano Counties

Personal details
- Born: 30 September 1864 Saku, Nagano, Japan
- Died: 8 July 1925 (aged 60)
- Party: Kenseikai (1916–1925)
- Other political affiliations: Rikken Seiyūkai (1912–1913); Chūseikai (1913–1916)
- Education: Ueda Middle School
- Alma mater: University of California; University of Chicago; London School of Economics; Heidelberg University; University of Paris

Jiro Okabe (岡部 次郎, Okabe Jirō; September 30, 1864 – July 8, 1925) was a member of the Japanese House of Representatives. He was a member of the Rikken Seiyūkai, the Chūseikai, and the Kenseikai.

== Early life ==
Okabe was born in Kasuga-mura, Shinano Province (present-day Saku, Nagano) on September 30, 1864. He was the second son of Yamon Okabe. After attending Ueda Middle School (now called Ueda High School), Okabe studied English at Dōjinsha in Tokyo. In 1885 he followed Korekiyo Takahashi to America. While living in Oakland in 1889, he converted to Christianity. He then moved to the Kingdom of Hawaii with Harvey Saburo Hayashi in the same year.

== Hawaii ==
In Hawaii, Okabe was ordained on July 20, 1890, and started the first Japanese church in Hilo, the Church of the Holy Cross, on January 18, 1891. He was transferred to Honolulu in 1893. Shortly after transferring to Honolulu, he returned to Japan to recruit more Japanese missionaries, including Takie Okumura and Shiro Sokabe. He also inherited the "Hawai Shinbun", a Japanese-language newspaper, from Jukichi Uchida in 1894, but quickly transferred it to Kenichiro Hoshida.

During the overthrow of the Kingdom of Hawaii, Okabe was on the side of the anti-monarchists. He joined the Citizens' Guard and worked to quell riots, fearing that the bad reputation of Japanese immigrants at the time would grow worse if they rioted. Once the riots were calmed, the royalists within the Japanese community didn't trust Okabe, and he left Hawaii in 1895.

After his time in Hawaii, he returned to the American mainland and attended the University of California. After graduation, he earned a doctorate at the University of Chicago. He also studied abroad at the London School of Economics, Heidelberg University, and the University of Paris.

== Japan ==
In 1899 Okabe returned to Japan and worked as a translator for the Ministry of Foreign Affairs. After that he helped Itō Hirobumi and Watanabe Kunitake form the Rikken Seiyūkai. He also became the head writer of the Hokkai Times. When the Russo-Japanese War started Okabe worked as the director of foreign correspondents. After the war Okabe became the head of Yingkou's military government's diplomacy, resident affairs, and administrative divisions in quick succession.

Okabe was elected to office during the 1912 Japanese general election. He was re-elected four times.

He died on July 8, 1925. On the previous day he had been awarded the title Jushi-i.

== Bibliography ==
- 広幡明男 (1924). 大正十三年五月当選 代議士詳覧. 泰山堂.
- 加藤紫泉 (1924). 新代議士名鑑. 国民教育会.
- 信濃人物略誌. 信濃青年会. 1919.
- 細井肇 (1916). 現代日本の政治家. 国光社.
