= Harvey Saburo Hayashi =

Japanese doctor and newspaper publisher

Harvey Saburo Hayashi(林 三郎) (February 22, 1867 – June 1, 1943) was a Japanese doctor who practiced in Kona, Hawaii. He started a local newspaper, the Kona Echo.

== Early life and education ==
Hayashi was born in Fukushima, Japan in 1867 to a samurai family in the Aizu-Wakamatsu clan. He graduated from Aomori Prefectural Medical School in 1884, then moved to America, where he was a migrant worker until he saved up enough money for medical school, since he came to America against his father's wishes and therefore didn't have financial support. Hayashi studied at the Hahnemann Medical College in San Francisco. During medical school he was nicknamed "Harvey" after William Harvey, because his professors had a hard time with "Saburo".

After he graduated in 1891, Hayashi opened up a practice in Sacramento. In 1893, he moved to Honomu in the Big Island of Hawaii's Kona district at the invitation of Jiro Okabe. In 1895, he married Matsu Kawarada, and during their lives they had twelve children.

== Kona ==
Hayashi opened a practice in Honomu when he first arrived in Hawaii, but he soon moved it to Kailua-Kona.

In 1897, Hayashi started the Kona Echo (コナ反響), Kona's first newspaper and Hawaii's second Japanese language newspaper. He and his family worked together to publish it twice a week, though its publication decreased in frequency until it published bimonthly for the last ten years of its existence. The Japanese section was discontinued in 1940, and the entire newspaper folded in 1941.

Hayashi was a major figure in the Kona Japanese community. He helped to establish the Japanese cemetery in 1896, then he founded the Japanese language school in Holualoa in 1898. It was an independent language school that wasn't affiliated with a religion, as many Japanese language schools were at the time. Hayashi's wife, Matsu, taught at the school until a full-time teacher (Sukezo Takeda) was hired. He later also founded the Kona Japanese Benevolent Association.

Hayashi died on June 1, 1943, and was buried at Central Kona Union Church.

== Selected bibliography ==
- Hayashi, Saburo (1909). Hawai Jitsugyo Annai [ハワイ実業案内] [A guide to business in Hawaii]. Kona.
- Hayashi, Saburo (1925). Hawaito Ishu [布哇島一周] [One time around Hawaii Island]. Kona: Kona Hankyosha.
