= Shiro Sokabe =

Japanese Christian minister

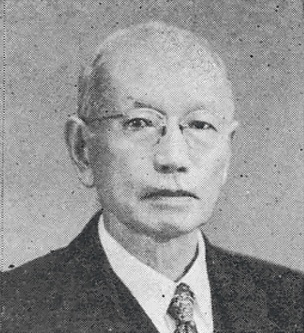
Shiro Sokabe

Shiro Sokabe (曽我部 四郎) (June 26, 1865 – July 3, 1949) was a Christian missionary from Japan who ministered in Honomu, Hawaii. He was known as the "Samurai Missionary"

== Early life ==
Sokabe was born in Fukuoka, Japan on June 26, 1865. He was the oldest son Michiyue Sokabe, a samurai, and had a stepmother named Yone. His father's strict nature led Sokabe to run away from home as a teenager, wandering southern Japan until he reached Imabari, Ehime prefecture in 1883. He was taken in by Tokio Yokoi and converted to Christianity. During this time, he also became friends with Kenjiro Tokutomi. In 1885 he began studying at the Oye Gijuku in Kumamoto, but when the school closed down in 1886, he went to Kyoto to study at Doshisha University. Sokabe left university without graduating in 1890. He then went to Nara and Gunma for a few years each before being recruited to become a missionary in Hawaii by Jiro Okabe in 1894.

== Honomu ==
Sokabe arrived in Hawaii in March of 1894 and started the Hilo Coast United Church of Christ. He was surprised by the harsh treatment of Japanese immigrant workers at the sugar plantations. He returned to Japan in 1896 to marry Shika Nakagawa and bring her back to Hawaii. They left her son in Japan to finish school, and he joined them in Hawaii in 1906. In 1897, Sokabe founded the Honomu Gijuku, a Japanese-language boarding school. It was also known as the Honomu Christian Boarding School. At its peak, the school had 150 students, and served 1,500 students over its lifetime. It was also a shelter for abused women, runaways, and the homeless. The campus expanded once in 1900, and again in 1908. After Shika died in 1920, Sokabe held a fundraising drive to build a new chapel in her memory, but was not successful, falling $3000 short.

Sokabe was open-minded about the texts he would quote while preaching and the places he would take students to while teaching. While he preached the Christian faith, his foremost concern was for people of all denominations and religions. He helped to build a Soto Buddhist temple.

Sokabe retired in 1942, and died on July 3, 1949. He wanted everything that he had written destroyed upon his death. Throughout his life, Sokabe was called the "Samurai Missionary", and continues to be remembered as such after his death.

== See also ==
- Takie Okumura
