= Līhuʻe Hongwanji Mission =

- U.S. National Register of Historic Places
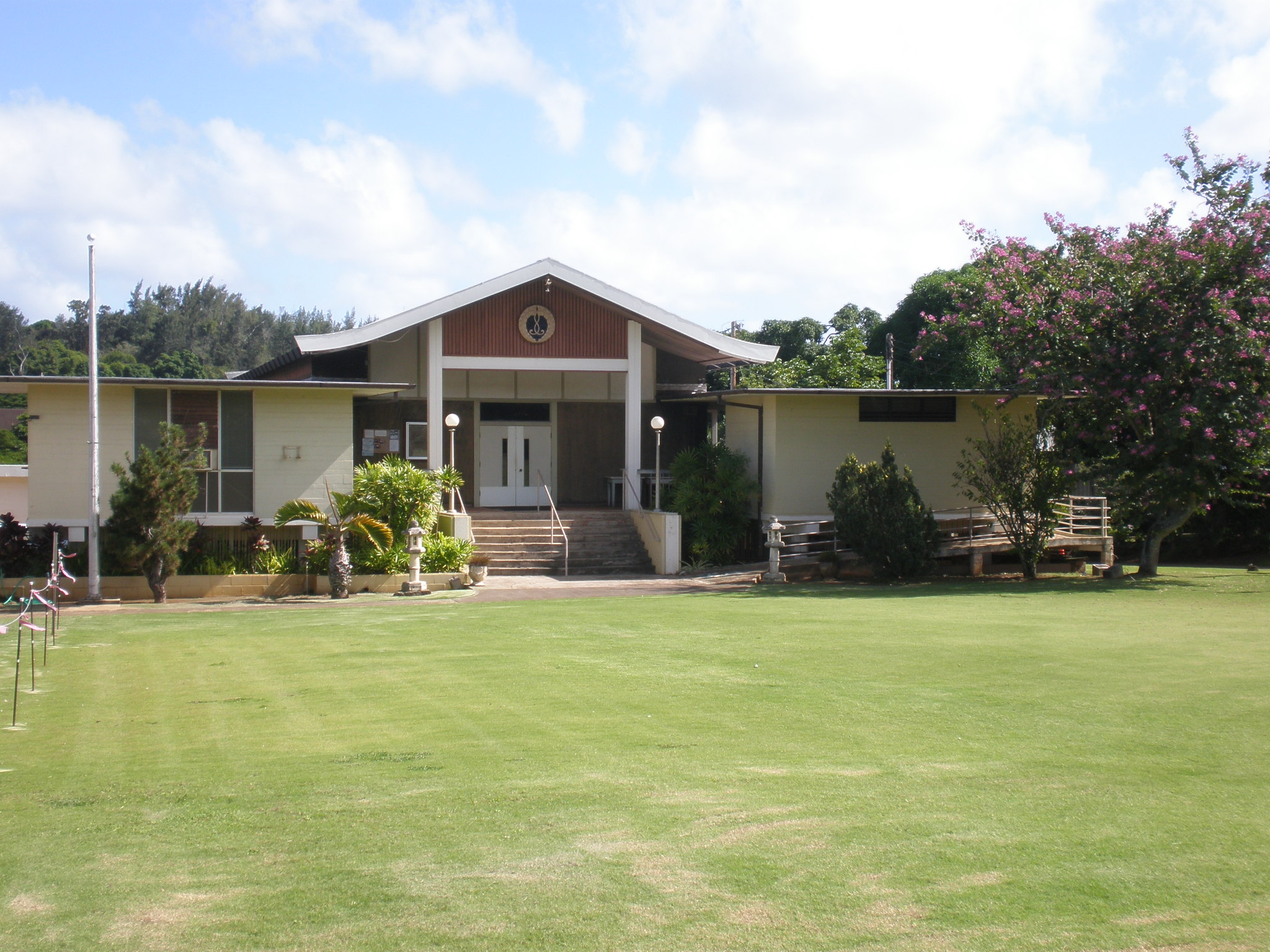

- Location within Hawaii
- Location: North of Līhuʻe at Hawaii Route 56, at 3-3556-A Kuhio Highway
- Nearest city: Līhuʻe, Hawaii
- Coordinates: 21°59′44″N 159°22′8″W
- Area: 0.4 acres (0.16 ha)
- Built: 1901
- NRHP reference No.: 78001025
- Added to NRHP: March 21, 1978

The Līhuʻe Hongwanji Mission, near Līhuʻe, Hawaii on Kauaʻi, is a historic mission whose construction was started in 1901. It was a branch of the Honpa Hongwanji Mission of Hawaii. It was listed on the National Register of Historic Places in 1978. It is significant as the oldest surviving Japanese Buddhist mission on Kauaʻi; it "reinforced Japanese ties to the mother country by preserving the language, education and cultural foundations, of immigrant Japanese laborers." The Lihue Plantation Company supported its development as a way of indirectly maintaining social control. It included Sunday school classes but the Japanese language school gradually became the most important part of the mission.

It is associated with Honpa Hongwanji Mission of Hawaii.
