= The Essential Shinran =

2007 book by Alfred Bloom

The Essential Shinran: A Buddhist Path of True Entrusting
- Author: Alfred Bloom
- Language: English
- Genre: Biography
- Publisher: World Wisdom
- Publication date: 2007
- Publication place: United States
- Media type: Print (Hardback and Paperback)
- Pages: 272 pages
- ISBN: 978-1-933316-21-5
- OCLC: 71369089
- Dewey Decimal: 294.3/926 22
- LC Class: BQ8749 .S55213 2007

The Essential Shinran: A Buddhist Path of True Entrusting is a compilation of passages from the writings and life story of Shinran Shonin. Shinran, who wrote during the Kamakura Period, was a Japanese monk who founded Jodo Shinshu Buddhism, which eventually became the largest Buddhist sect in Japan.

The book (compiled by Alfred Bloom, with a foreword by Ruben L.F. Habito) is divided into three major sections:

- Shinran's Life and Legacy
- What Do We Know of Shinran in the Ancient Sources?
- Shinran Interprets Pure Land Teaching.

The book is an attempt to bring Pure Land Buddhism to the attention of a Western audience.

Essential Shinran has the potential to dramatically increase Western appreciation of one of the largest, yet least understood forms of Buddhism. As such, the book ranks among the most important publications on Pure Land Buddhism of the past decade, valuable to scholars and Buddhist practitioners alike.

— Tricycle: The Buddhist Review

The book received the Silver (2nd) Book of the Year Award in the Religion category (2007) from ForeWord Magazine.
