= Makiki Christian Church =

Church in Hawaii, U.S.

Coordinates: 21.2986011°N 157.8483331°W

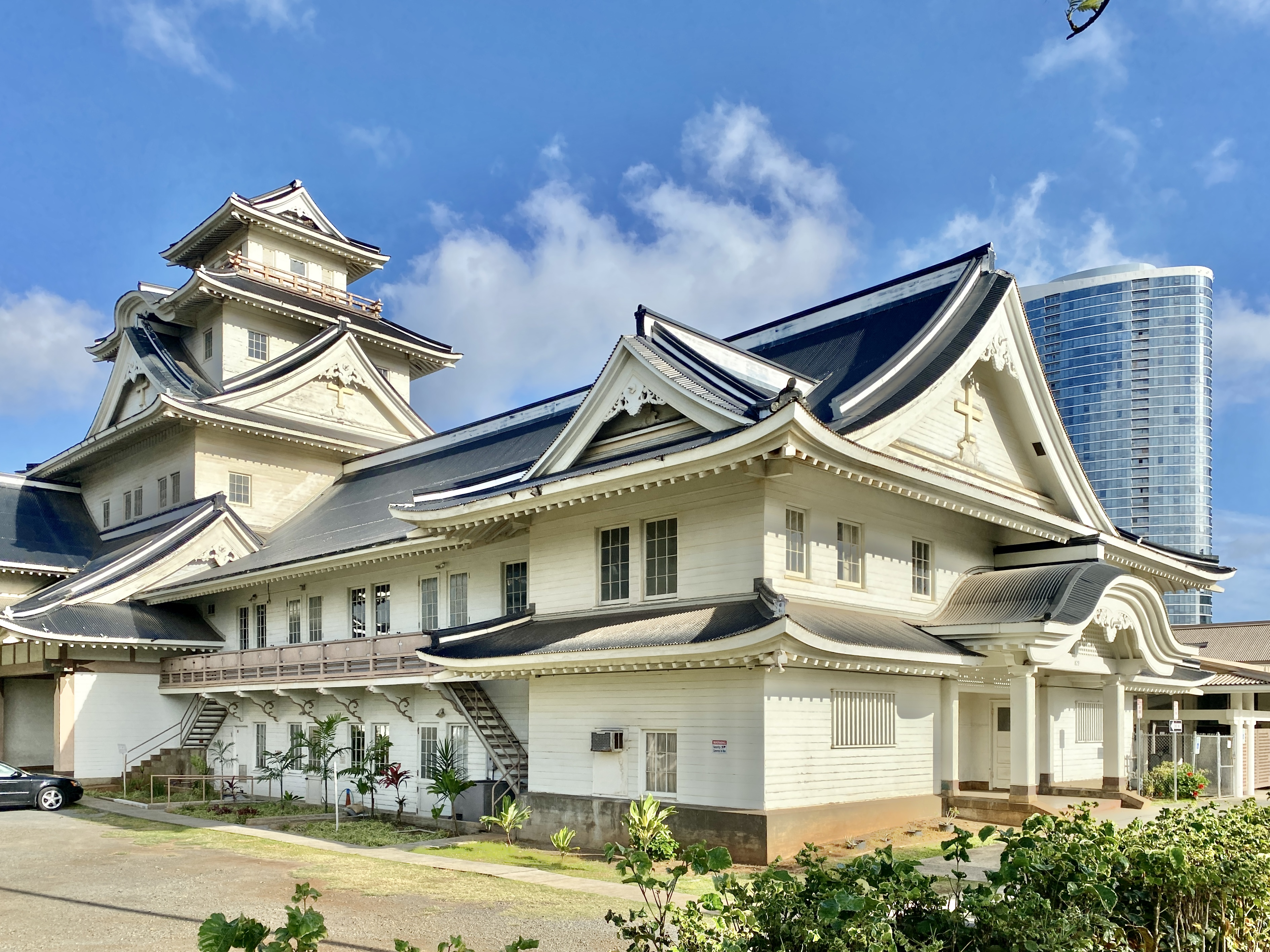
- Makiki Christian Church
- Denomination: United Church of Christ

History
- Founded: 1904
- Founder: Takie Okumura

Architecture
- Architect: Hego Fuchino
- Years built: 1932

Makiki Christian Church is a Christian church located in Honolulu, Hawaii. It was built in 1931, and is the only Christian church in the United States designed to look like a 16th-century Japanese castle.

== History ==
In 1903, Takie Okumura, a pastor from Japan, left his congregation at the Honolulu Japanese Christian Church (now the Nuuanu Congregational Church) to start the Aiyū kai. On April 8, 1904, Takie Okumura founded the Makiki Church, but there wasn't an actual building until a few years later. In 1905, George Castle, a local businessman, donated a plot of land to the church so that they could build the actual church, which was built in 1906. It could hold up to 500 people.

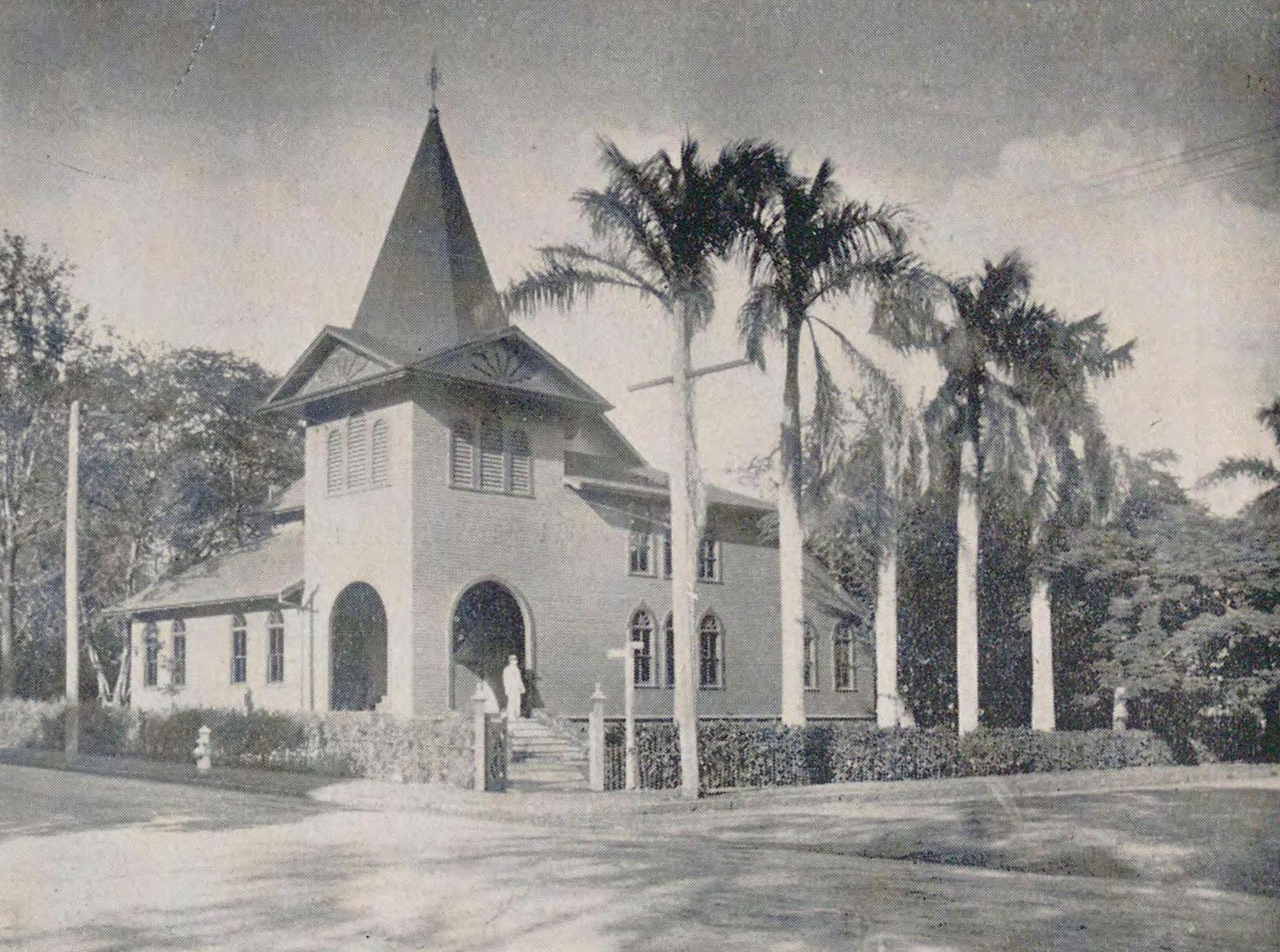
The church at the intersection of Kina'u and Pensacola Streets in 1911

In 1927, after the existing church building had been infested by termites, the congregation decided to buy another plot of land and build another church. This became the "Castle Church", which still exists today. The church was modeled after the Kochi castle in Kochi prefecture, Japan, where Okumura was from. Okumura chose the design to symbolize peace and protection, though at the time it was criticized because it was misunderstood to represent militarism. Hego Fuchino was the architect who created the plans for the church. It is the only church in the United States that has been designed to look like an Edo period Japanese castle.

The new church was dedicated on November 6, 1932. In 1936, a dining hall and classrooms were added to the building.

The Christian Education building was built in 1960.
