= Hego Fuchino =

Japanese architect in Hawaii

- 淵野平吾
- Hego Fuchino, from a 1928 newspaper
- Born: July 15, 1888; Saga, Japan
- Died: May 15, 1961 (aged 72); Honolulu, Hawaii, U.S.
- Other names: Heigo Fuchino, Hego Fujino
- Occupation: Architect

Hego Fuchino (淵野平吾) (July 15, 1888 – May 15, 1961) was a Japanese-born architect in Hawaii. He designed the Makiki Christian Church, the Izumo Taishakyo Mission, and the Hawaii Shingon Mission, among many other buildings, especiallly in Honolulu.

== Early life and education ==
Fuchino was born in Saga, Japan, in 1888. He immigrated to Hawaii in 1907, attended the ‘Iolani School, and studied civil engineering at the University of Hawaii.

== Career ==
After graduation, Fuchino worked as a surveyor while he taught himself architecture, and opened up an engineering firm. Fuchino designed many iconic buildings in Hawaii. In 1919, Fuchino designed the Nippon Theater, and the Kaimuki Playhouse in 1922. In 1929 he renovated the Hawaii Shingon Mission. In 1931 he designed the Hale’iwa Theatre and the Makiki Christian church. Other Fuchino projects in Hawaii included the Oahu Theater, Sodo Mission, a Shinto shrine in Palama, Izuma Taisha Kyo Mission, the Kuakini Home, Wahiawa Honpa Hongwanji Mission, Otani Market, Iida's Store, the Muraoka Drug Store building, and the Hokkekyoji Mission.

Makiki Christian Church in Honolulu, designed by Fuchino

In December 1941, after the bombing of Pearl Harbor, Fuchino was one of many Japanese community leaders in Hawaii who was arrested and interned on the mainland, in his case in Wisconsin.

== Personal life ==
Fuchino married Hawaii-born Sawaya Uyemoto in 1918, and had at least eight children. Two daughters died in infancy, in 1930 and 1936. Fuchino died in 1961, in Honolulu, at age 72. Wilfred Fuchino donated his father's drawings to the Hamilton Library at the University of Hawaii.
