= Pacific Buddhist Academy =

School in Honolulu, Hawaii, US

Location
- Honolulu, Hawaii; United States
- 21.3167°N 157.8516°W

Information
- Type: Independent Co-educational Preparatory Day (high school)
- Religious affiliation: Buddhist
- Denomination: Jōdo Shinshū
- Established: 2003
- Head of school: Joshua Hernandez Morse
- Faculty: 10
- Grades: 9-12
- Enrollment: 75
- Campus type: Urban
- Colors: Teal, Indigo & Gold
- Athletics: Interscholastic League of Honolulu
- Mascot: Dragon
- Accreditation: WASC, HAIS
- Website: pacificbuddhistacademy.org

The Pacific Buddhist Academy is a private, co-educational college preparatory high school in Honolulu, Hawaii.

The school's stated mission is "To prepare students for college through academic excellence, enrich their lives with Buddhist values, and develop their courage to nurture peace." Students of all beliefs and religious backgrounds are welcome; conversion to Buddhism is not part of the school's mission.

Founded in 2003, the school is the only Jōdo Shinshū Buddhist high school in North America.

Pacific Buddhist Academy's first class of 14 students graduated in 2007; its total enrollment as of the 2013-2014 school year, in grades 9 through 12, is 71 students.

The school won accreditation in 2009 from the Hawaii Association of Independent Schools and the Western Association of Schools and Colleges for a six-year-term through June 2015, with a mid-term visit in spring 2012.

== Affiliations ==
Pacific Buddhist Academy was founded with an initial $1.5 million endowment from the Jōdo Shinshū Buddhist Church of Kyoto, Japan. The school also receives significant financial support from the temples and individual members of the Honpa Hongwanji Mission of Hawaii, which operates Hongwanji Mission School, covering preschool through grade 8. Pacific Buddhist Academy and Hongwanji Mission School are affiliated academically, but the academy was founded as a separate 501(c)(3) nonprofit organization to allow for independent fundraising efforts. Team sports are conducted through the academy's membership in the Interscholastic League of Honolulu.

== Curriculum ==
Pacific Buddhist Academy's curriculum aims to combine traditional college preparatory content with group projects and a global, applied approach to learning. Instructors seek to recognize and build upon students’ individual learning processes as they teach students to think critically and creatively, and to collaborate. The school works to integrate basic Buddhist principles—including interdependence, compassion, mindfulness, and gratitude—into the courses as well as daily academic life.

Pacific Buddhist Academy class sizes do not exceed 24 students. Coursework makes extensive use of on-campus wireless Internet access.

=== Core academic curriculum ===
Pacific Buddhist Academy offers core academic courses, electives, and co-curricular opportunities. Core academic offerings include:

- English
- Math
- Science
- Social studies
- Japanese Language
- Buddhist Education

Electives are divided into four related strands: budō or martial arts, emphasizing spiritual & philosophical development, the expressive arts, the visual arts, and academically-based electives (standard and honors track). Students also have the opportunity to participate in academic, community service and social clubs.

=== Peace education and spiritual development ===
Peace Studies, fine, performing, and budō arts classes, service learning projects, and Buddhist education comprise the peace education program at Pacific Buddhist Academy. The foundation for these programs is derived from Buddhist principles that focus on wisdom and compassion. The perspectives of all schools of Buddhism are recognized, but with an emphasis on Shin Buddhist teachings. Buddhist Living classes are required for four years, and students attend temple services each Friday.

As freshmen, students focus on personal spiritual development through experiential learning. They enroll in courses such as taiko (Japanese drumming), kendo (swordsmanship), and judo that foster self-awareness and the unity of mind, body and spirit. In their sophomore and junior years, students focus on interpersonal communication, mediation, and conflict resolution skills that directly apply to their developing and intensifying relationships with peers and parents. Finally, in their senior year, their attention moves to clarification and application of their personal values at the community, national and international levels as they engage in peace projects.

=== Athletics ===
Pacific Buddhist Academy students can compete on the Interscholastic League of Honolulu's Pac-Five teams in baseball, girls’ softball, judo, swimming, tennis, track and field, water polo, and wrestling. In addition, the academy fields its own cross-country, boys’ basketball and girls’ bowling teams. Students also can participate on Pac-Five member teams in girls’ basketball and volleyball.

== Campus ==
The Pacific Buddhist Academy campus fronts Pali Highway in the Nu'uanu area of Honolulu on the grounds of the Hawaii Betsuin, the main temple of the Honpa Hongwanji Mission of Hawaii. Classrooms and administrative offices occupy a remodeled annex building of the Betsuin. The academy also shares a gymnasium, martial-arts dojo, swimming pool, science labs and art and music classrooms with Hongwanji Mission School, a Betsuin-run elementary school located on the opposite side of Pali Highway. The campuses are connected by a pedestrian tunnel.

As of 2010, the academy has launched a capital campaign for the construction of a new classroom building along the Lusitana Street side of its campus, as part of a plan to expand to a maximum of 240 students over the next 10 years. The first phase of the construction is planned to accommodate 120 students.

In late 2017, the Harry Jeanette Weinberg building opened to learning, while continuing to utilize the "old building" for extra-curricular activities.

== Demographics ==
Reflecting Hawaii's diverse ethnic heritage, 42 percent of the academy's students identify themselves with more than one ethnic group, with the overall breakdown as follows: American Indian, 5.45 percent; Asian, 89.09 percent; Filipino, 14.55 percent; Hispanic or Latino, 18.18 percent; Pacific Islander, 16.36 percent; White, not of Hispanic origin, 25.45 percent, and Other, 1.82 percent.

One-third of student families identify themselves as Buddhist, one-third Christian and the rest specify no religious affiliation.

== Notable alumni ==
- Lauren Tsai, illustrator and model
