= Ueda High School =

Public school in Ueda, Japan

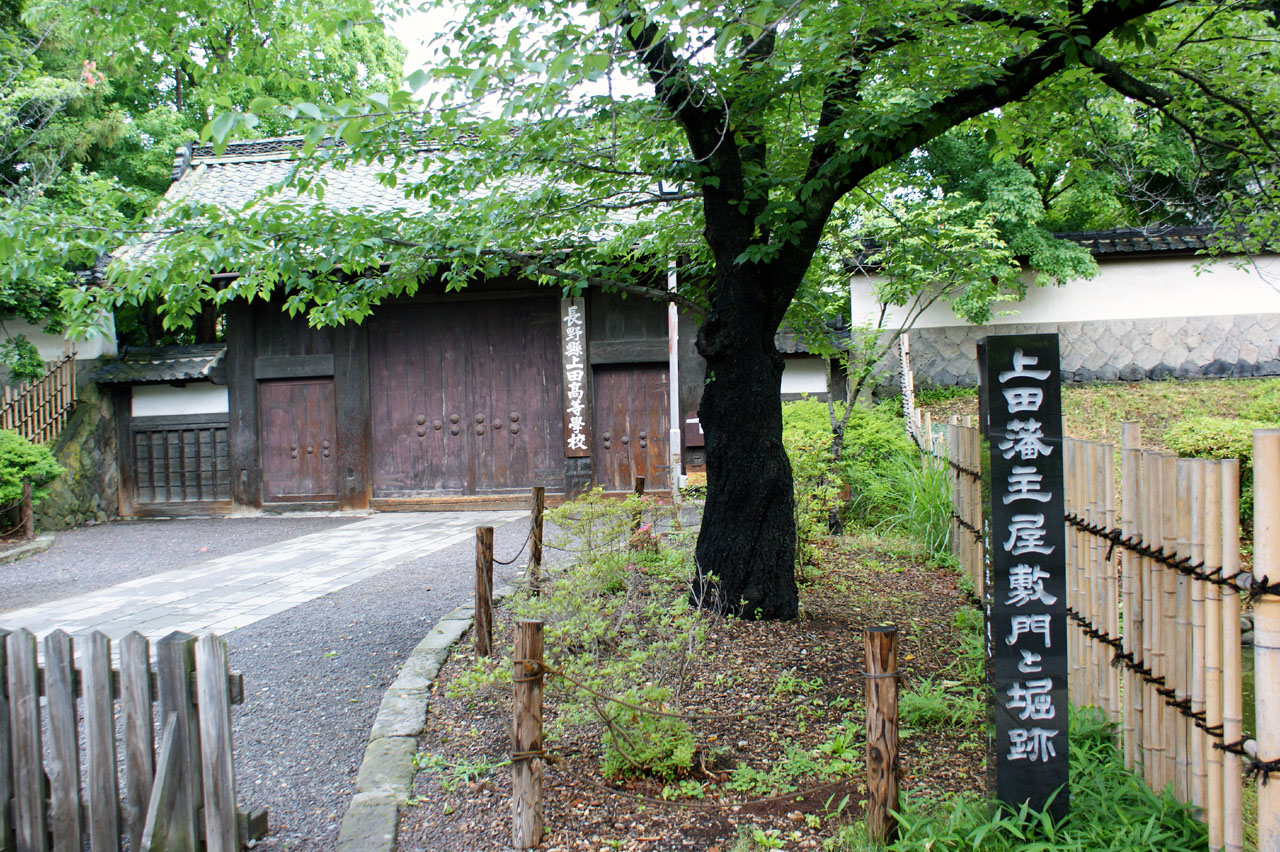

Location
- 1-4-32 Ōte, Ueda, Nagano; Ueda; Japan

Information
- Type: Public
- Established: July 1875, 151 years ago
- Website: http://www.nagano-c.ed.jp/ueda-hs

Ueda High School (上田高校, Ueda Kōkō) is a public high school in Ueda, Nagano, Japan.
