= Hongwanji Mission School =

Private day school in Honolulu, United States

Coordinates: 21.3169392°N 157.853009°W

Location
- 1728 Pali Highway; Honolulu, Hawaiʻi 96813; United States

Information
- Type: Private, Day
- Established: 1949
- Founder: Aiko Fujitani
- Sister school: Pacific Buddhist Academy
- Head of School: David Randall
- Grades: PS–8
- Gender: Coeducational
- Student to teacher ratio: 18:1
- Colors: Purple, White
- Team name: Dolphins
- Accreditation: Western Association of Schools and Colleges
- Website: www.hongwanjimissionschool.com

Hongwanji Mission School (HMS) is a private co-educational preparatory school (grades pre-school through eighth) located in Nuuanu Valley and adjacent to Downtown Honolulu. Accredited by the Western Association of Schools and Colleges and the Hawaii Association of Independent Schools, HMS first opened its doors in 1949 and was the first Buddhist school established outside Japan.

HMS has a maximum student-teacher ratio of 18:1. Japanese-language classes are part of the curriculum at all grade levels. The campus includes a gymnasium, swimming pool, library, and computer center. In addition, HMS offers after school, holiday daycare, and summer-school programs.

In 2003, HMS announced the opening of a Buddhist high school, Pacific Buddhist Academy, which shares a campus with HMS.

== See also ==
- Hongwanji
