= Yemyo Imamura =

Buddhist priest active in Honolulu, Hawaii, US (1867–1932)

- 今村恵猛
- Born: May 27, 1867; Fukui Prefecture, Tokugawa Shogunate (modern-day Japan)
- Died: December 12, 1932 (aged 65); Honolulu, Territory of Hawaii, United States
- Education: Keio University

Yemyo Imamura (今村恵猛) (May 27, 1867 – December 22, 1932) was a Japanese Buddhist priest who was active in Honolulu, Hawaii, and was a leader in the Japanese American community. He was a priest at the Honpa Hongwanji, and started their Young Men's Buddhist Association (YMBA).

== Early life ==
Imamura was born in Togo village, Fukui prefecture, Japan on May 27, 1867. He entered the priesthood in 1876, when he was 10 years old. After studying in temple schools in Kyoto, he received a scholarship to study at Keio University in Tokyo. He graduated in 1893, then returned to Fukui to teach English.

== Career ==
In 1899, Imamura moved to Hawaii to serve the Jodo Shinshu Buddhists there. He took over the Honpa Hongwanji when its first priest, Honi Satomi, returned to Japan. Heth married his wife Kiyoko in 1904, and they had a son named Kanmo, who also became a priest.

Imamura established the Young Men's Buddhist Association as a Buddhist equivalent to the YMCA. Their activities included teaching English, helping new immigrants adjust to the local culture, and publishing a magazine called Dōhō. In 1902 Imamura opened the Fort Gakuen, an elementary school attached to the temple. He later opened the Hawaii Chugakko (middle school) in 1907. Both schools were Japanese language schools that student attended after the regular school day finished. He also advocated for plantation laborers and picture brides.

Much of Imamura's career was spent showing the similarities between Buddhism and Christianity and Americanizing young Japanese immigrants through Buddhism. He wanted to make Buddhism more compatible with American life in Hawaii, and show it as a "universal" rather than "supernatural" religion. Unlike his Christian contemporary, Takie Okumura, Imamura's focus while Americanizing Japanese youth wasn't to encourage them to leave Japanese culture behind, but rather to carry its values with them as American citizens.

In 1928, Imamura was awarded the Order of the Sacred Treasure for his work expanding the influence of Jodo Shinshu in Hawaii.

Imamura died on December 22, 1932.

== Family ==
His wife Kiyoko (清子) is a daughter of Ahikaga Gizan (jp:足利義山). Kiyoko's younger sister, Kai Wariko (jp:甲斐和里子)., is the founder of Kyoto Women's University. Yemyo and Kiyoko's daughter, Keiko Glenn, used to be a professor of Hawaii Loa College.
