= Takie Okumura =

Japanese Christian minister

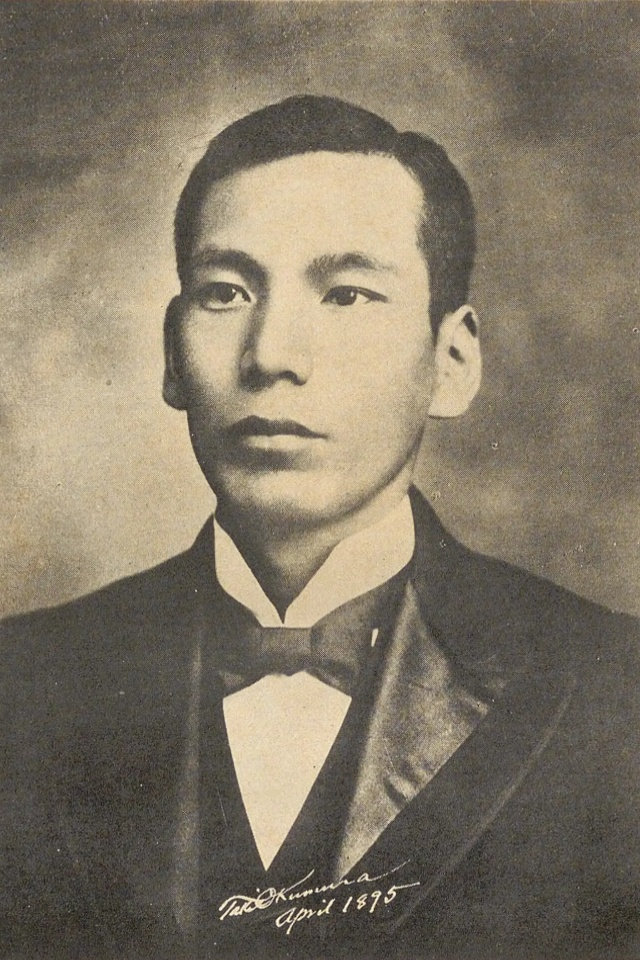
Takie Okumura

Takie Okumura (奥村 多喜衛) (May 12, 1865 – February 10, 1951) was a Japanese Christian minister. He was the founder of the Makiki Christian Church in Honolulu, Hawaii, the "Okumura Boys and Girls Home", and some of Hawaii's first Japanese language schools.

== Early life ==
Okumura was born to a family of samurai in Kochi prefecture, Japan in 1865. He married Katsu Ogawa in 1886. He converted to Christianity on September 9, 1888, and studied at Doshisha University. During his time at university he was supported by John Thomas Gulick. After graduating in 1894, he traveled to Hawaii as a missionary assisting Reverend Jiro Okabe. He took over Okabe's ministry in 1895 when Okabe returned to Japan.

== Career ==
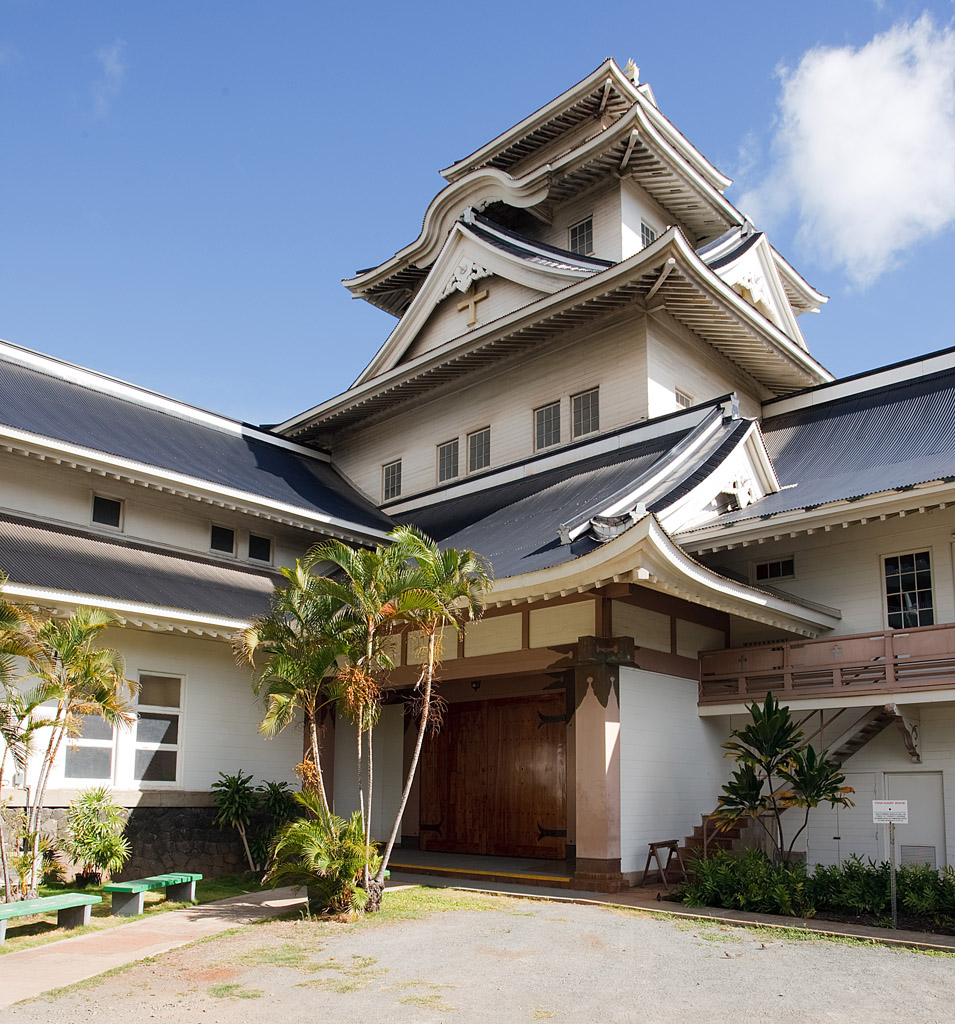
Makiki Christian Church

One of the first things Okumura did after taking over Okabe's congregation in 1895 is start a Japanese kindergarten. His goal was to teach Japanese children living in Hawaii the Japanese language, because many spoke pidgin, English, or Hawaiian. He established the Honolulu Japanese Elementary school a year later in 1896. The school later expanded and was renamed the Hawaii Chuo Gakuin. The schools he founded were the first Japanese language schools in Hawaii.

In 1896 Okumura founded the "Okumura Boys and Girls Home" after taking in a young man attending school in Honolulu. The dormitory housed 1,400 students over the years, mostly from neighbor islands. While staying at the dormitory, students had to attend church. Spark Matsunaga was one notable resident.

In 1899 he founded a baseball team made up mostly of students living at the "Okumura Home". The team was called the "Excelsiors", and was the first Japanese baseball team in Hawaii. Okumura founded the team in order to provide a wholesome entertainment venue, away from the "vice" in town.

In 1904 Okumura established the Makiki Christian Church. The modern church building, which is well-known for its architectural similarity to a Japanese castle, was not constructed until 1932. Okumura chose that architectural style as a symbol of peace and security.

After the Oahu sugar strike of 1920, Okumura traveled to every island to encourage nisei to "Americanize", and give up their dual citizenship with Japan. He believed that this would solve the "Japanese problem", a term coined by European sugar plantation owners. Needless to say, many Japanese plantation workers were not pleased with his decision to side with the sugar plantation owners during this tense time between the management and laborers. During this time, and later when the American government tried to impose legislation restricting foreign language schools, Okumura clashed with Fred Kinzaburo Makino.

Okumura retired from the church in 1937, but remained head of the "Okumura Home" until he died on February 10, 1951.

== See also ==
- Japanese in Hawaii
- Shiro Sokabe
