= Jodo Mission of Hawaii =

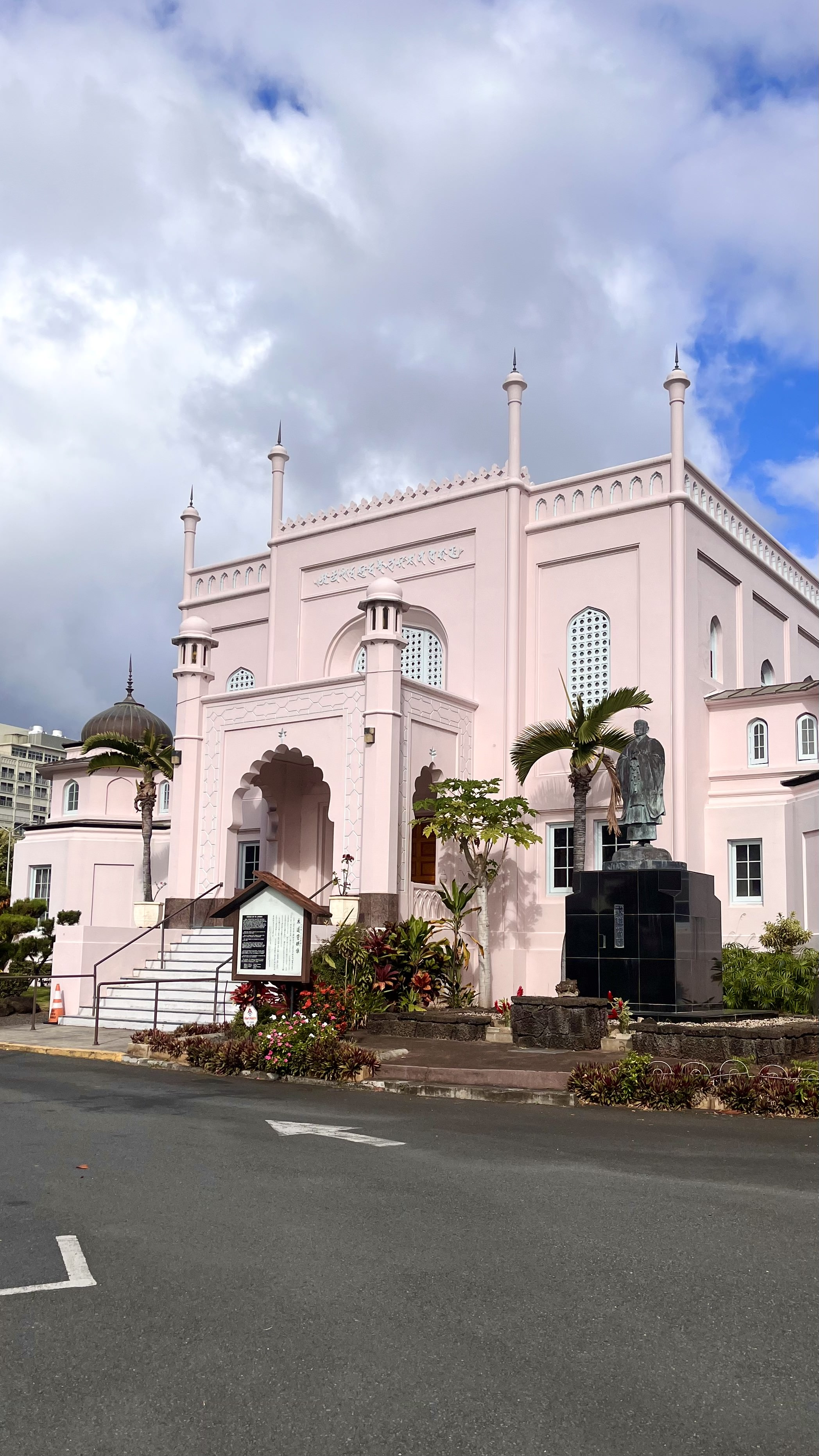

Religion
- Affiliation: Jōdo-shū
- Deity: Amida Buddha

Location
- Location: Honolulu, Hawaii
- Interactive map of Jodo Mission of Hawaii
- Coordinates: 21°18′6″N 157°50′11″W

Architecture
- Architect: Hego Fuchino
- Style: Mughal
- Established: 1907, 1932

Website
- Official website

The Jodo Mission of Hawaii, also known as the Jodo Shu Betsuin, is a Jōdo-shū Buddhist temple located in Honolulu, Hawaii. It was founded in southern Honolulu in 1907 and moved to its current location in 1932.
