= Honalo, Hawaii =

Census-designated place in Hawaii, U.S.

Honalo
- Census-designated place
- Location in Hawaii County and the state of Hawaii
- Coordinates: 19°33′34″N 155°55′47″W
- Country: United States
- State: Hawaii
- County: Hawaii

Area
  - Total: 27.17 sq mi (70.38 km^{2})
  - Land: 27.17 sq mi (70.38 km^{2})
  - Water: 0 sq mi (0.00 km^{2})
- Elevation: 1,391 ft (424 m)

Population (2020)
  - Total: 996
  - Density: 36.6/sq mi (14.15/km^{2})
- Time zone: UTC-10 (Hawaii-Aleutian)
- Area code: 808
- FIPS code: 15-16000
- GNIS feature ID: 0359266

Honalo is a census-designated place (CDP) in Hawaiʻi County, Hawaiʻi, United States. As of the 2020 census, Honalo had a population of 996.

== Geography ==
Honalo is located on the western side of the island of Hawaii at 19°33′34″N 155°55′47″W (19.559309, -155.929832). It is bordered to the north by Holualoa, to the south by Kealakekua, and to the west by Kahaluu-Keauhou. Hawaii Route 11 runs through western part of the community, leading north 7 miles (11 km) to Kailua-Kona and south 51 miles (82 km) to Naalehu. Hawaii Route 180 is a secondary route that branches off Route 11 in Honalo and runs to the east of it.

According to the United States Census Bureau, the Honalo CDP has a total area of 29.6 square miles (76.6 km^{2}), all of it land.

== Demographics ==
=== 2000 Census data ===
Historical population
| Census | Pop. | Note | %± |
|---|---|---|---|
| 1990 | 1,926 | | — |
| 2000 | 1,987 | | 3.2% |
| 2010 | 2,423 | | 21.9% |
| 2020 | 996 | | −58.9% |

As of the census of 2000, there were 1,987 people, 717 households, and 504 families residing in the CDP. The population density was 67.8 inhabitants per square mile (26.2/km^{2}). There were 798 housing units at an average density of 27.2 per square mile (10.5/km^{2}). The racial makeup of the CDP was 38.70% White, 0.50% African American, 0.35% Native American, 20.84% Asian, 9.41% Pacific Islander, 1.06% from other races, and 29.14% from two or more races. Hispanic or Latino of any race were 10.57% of the population.

There were 717 households, out of which 32.5% had children under the age of 18 living with them, 49.8% were married couples living together, 14.2% had a female householder with no husband present, and 29.7% were non-families. 22.0% of all households were made up of individuals, and 8.6% had someone living alone who was 65 years of age or older. The average household size was 2.75 and the average family size was 3.15.

In the CDP the population was spread out, with 25.5% under the age of 18, 7.1% from 18 to 24, 26.6% from 25 to 44, 26.5% from 45 to 64, and 14.2% who were 65 years of age or older. The median age was 39 years. For every 100 females, there were 98.9 males. For every 100 females age 18 and over, there were 96.3 males.

The median income for a household in the CDP was $43,125, and the median income for a family was $46,827. Males had a median income of $27,270 versus $23,098 for females. The per capita income for the CDP was $17,584. About 13.0% of families and 19.1% of the population were below the poverty line, including 26.7% of those under age 18 and 6.2% of those age 65 or over.

== History ==
The Daifukuji Soto Zen Mission was built in Honalo in 1921.
