= Broken Ridge Buddhist Temple =

Korean Buddhist temple in Hawaii

Coordinates: 21.305076°N 157.782651°W

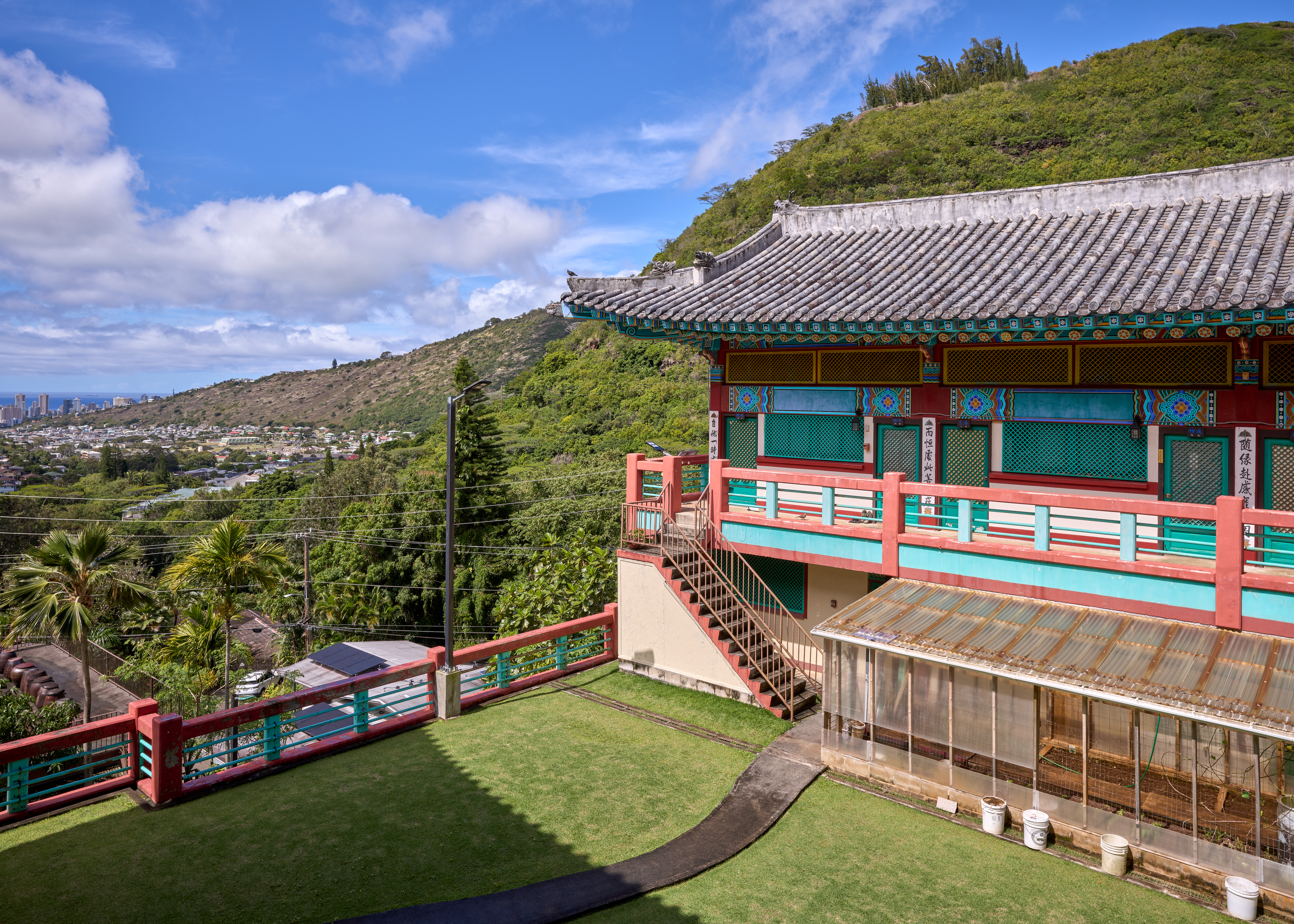
- View from the Mu-Ryang-Sa Korean Buddhist Temple towards Waikīkī

Religion
- Affiliation: Chogye

Location
- Location: 2420 Halelaau Place, Honolulu, HI 96816
- Country: United States
- Interactive map of Broken Ridge Buddhist Temple

Architecture
- Completed: 1975

Website
- muryangsatemple.com

Broken Ridge Buddhist Temple (Korean: 무량사; Hanja: 無量寺; RR: Muryangsa) is a Korean Buddhist temple on the island of Oahu in the U.S. state of Hawaii. Originally known as the "Dae Won Sa Temple," it was constructed on King St in Honolulu in 1975. After being destroyed by fire, construction of the new temple located in the Palolo Valley began in 1986. Due to legal disputes construction was not completed until 2005.

== Legal disputes ==
In February 1988, residents of Palolo filed the first of several lawsuits in an effort to legally force the height of the temple to be lowered. In 2001, the roof was lowered by over two meters to comply with a court order.
