= Byodo-In (Hawaii) =

Memorial park located on Oʻahu, Hawaiʻi, US

Coordinates: 21°25′51.43″N 157°49′54.44″W

Byodo-In Temple
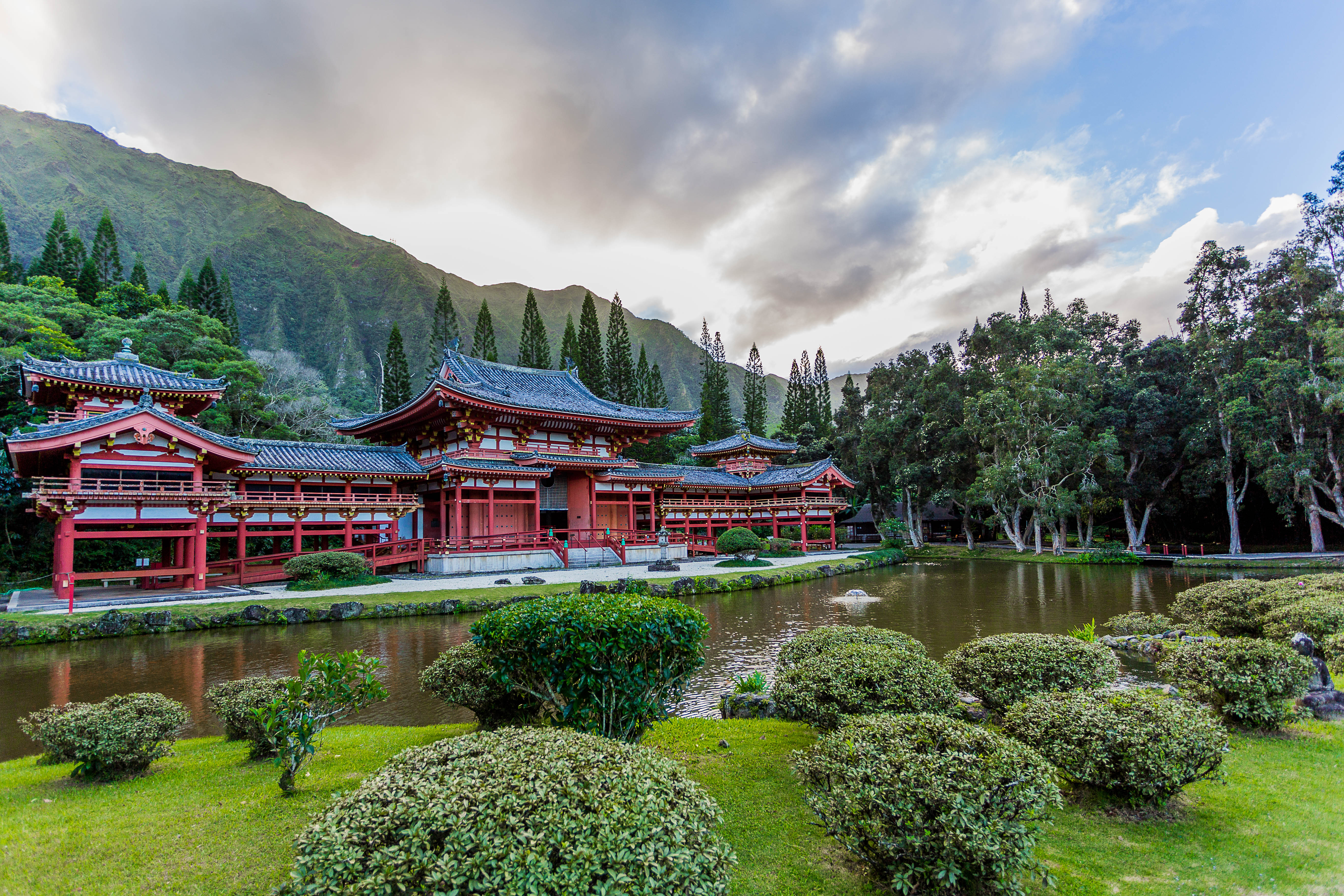
- Byodo-In Temple in Hawaiʻi is a replica of the historic Byodoin Temple of Uji in Kyoto prefecture of Japan.

Religion
- Affiliation: non-denominational

Location
- Location: 47-200 Kahekili Hwy Kaneohe, HI 96744
- Country: United States
- Interactive map of Byodo-In Temple

Architecture
- Completed: 1968

The Byodo-In Temple (Japanese: 平等院テンプル, Byōdōin Tenpuru) is a non-denominational Buddhist temple located on the island of Oʻahu in Hawaiʻi in Valley of the Temples Memorial Park. It was dedicated in August 1968 to commemorate the 100th anniversary of the first Japanese immigrants to Hawaiʻi. The temple is a replica of a 900-year-old Buddhist temple at Uji in Kyoto Prefecture of Japan, the latter being established in 1052.

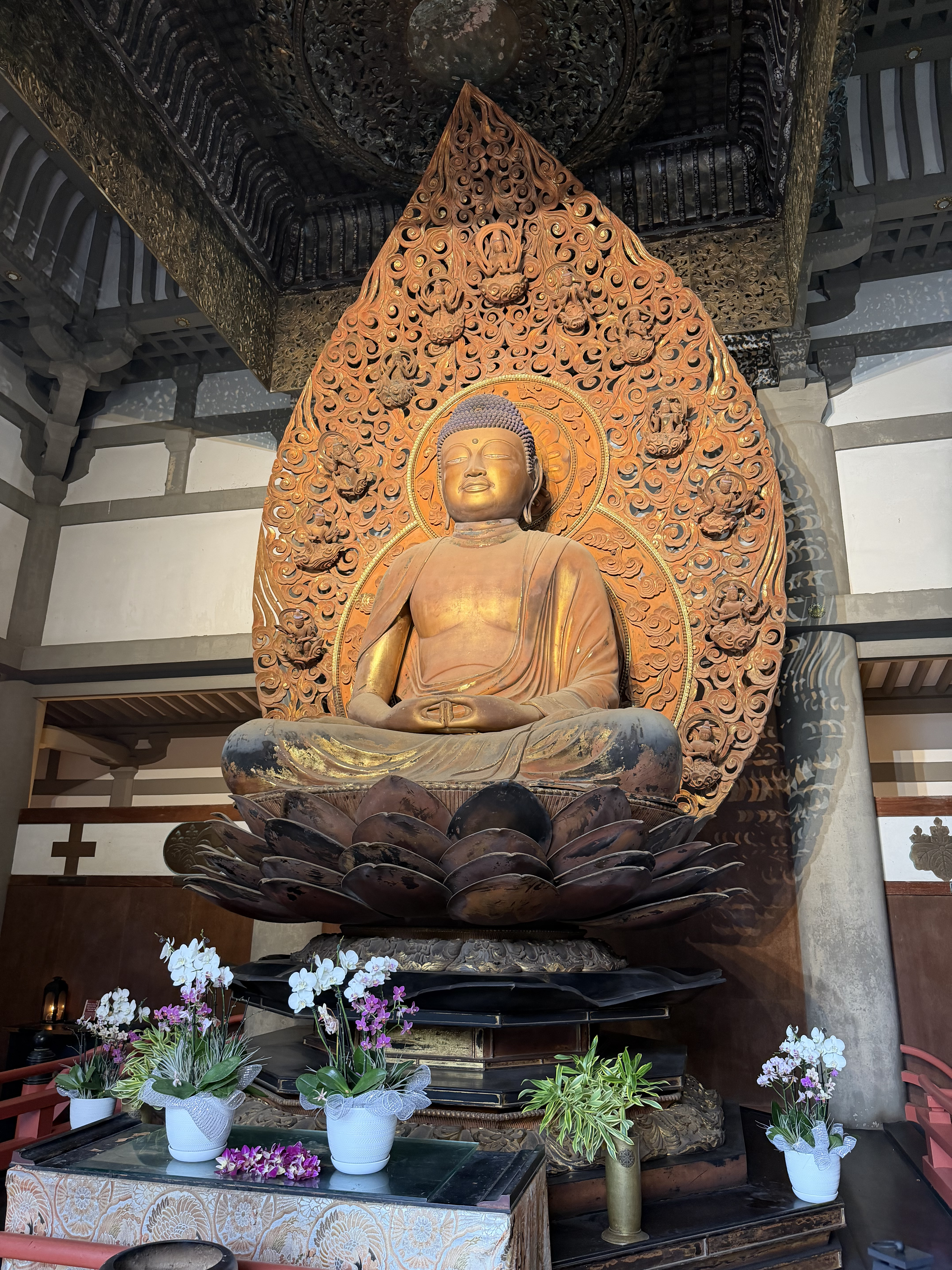
Statue of the Lotus Buddha.

Contrary to popular belief, the Byodo-In is not a functioning Buddhist temple in the proper sense as it does not host a resident monastic community nor an active congregation. Inside the Byodo-In Temple is a 18 ft (5.5 m) statue of the Lotus Buddha, a wooden image depicting Amitābha. It is covered in gold and lacquer. Outside is a three-ton, brass peace bell. Surrounding the temple are large koi ponds that cover a total of 2 acres (0.81 ha). Around those ponds are lush Japanese gardens set against a backdrop of towering cliffs of the Koʻolau Range. The gardens are home to sparrows, peafowl, and swans. The temple covers 11,000 sq ft (1,000 m^{2}).

The Byodo-In Temple is visited and used by thousands of worshipers from around the world. It welcomes people of all faiths to participate in its traditions. Apart from worship, the temple grounds are also used for weddings and office meetings.

== Ancient Japan ==
Byodo-In Temple is a smaller-scale replica of the Byōdō-in, a World Heritage Site near the ancient city of Kyoto, originally a monastery founded by Fujiwara no Yorimichi in 1052 of the Heian period. It was famous for its Vairocana statue. The statue was lost and replaced in 1053 with a large wooden statue of Amitābha, a national treasure carved by the Japanese artisan Jōchō.

The Amitābha statue stands in the midst of the Phoenix Hall (鳳凰堂, Hōōdō), an artistic reproduction of Sukhavati, the pure land of Amitābha. It is called the "Phoenix Hall" in English in reference to the two fenghuang birds stretching their wings upon the temple roof. Fifty-two wooden images of bodhisattvas surround Amitābha, dancing and playing musical instruments on floating clouds.

From 2001 to 2007, the temple underwent restoration in the spirit of preservation of Japan's ancient heritage.

The original Byōdō-in is wooden and constructed without the use of nails.

== Modern Hawaiʻi ==
Byodo-In Temple was commissioned and built largely by concrete in 1968 at its present location in the Valley of the Temples to celebrate the centennial anniversary of the arrival of Japanese culture to Hawaiʻi. It was dedicated by Governor John A. Burns, a favorite of the Japanese community for his long service for the cause of Japanese rights during the state's territorial years.

Japanese immigrants entered the Kingdom of Hawaiʻi and later Territory of Hawaiʻi to labor in the sugarcane and pineapple plantations. They joined the Chinese, Filipino, Korean, native Hawaiians and Portuguese.

== Valley of the Temples Memorial Park ==
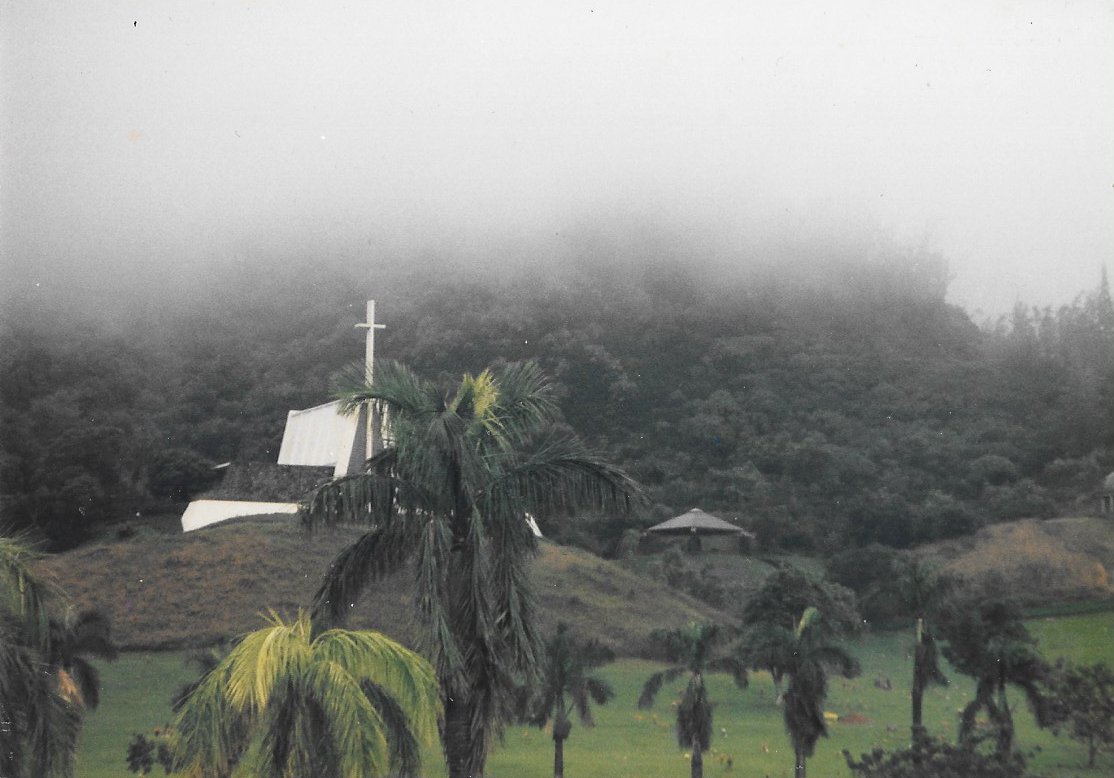
Chapel at Valley of the Temples, Oahu

The Valley of the Temples Memorial Park, where the Byodo-in Temple is located, also contains large Catholic statues depicting the Passion of Christ, the Virgin Mary, various Catholic saints, crypts and mausoleums of some of the most influential people in Hawaiʻi. Most notable of those interred at the mausoleums of the Valley of the Temples is Walter F. Dillingham, Hawaii entrepreneur and statesman. For a time, former Philippine President Ferdinand E. Marcos was interred at a private mausoleum overlooking the Byodo-In temple. Thousands of Buddhist, Shinto, Protestant and Catholic residents of Hawaiʻi are buried in this memorial park. It was founded by Paul Trousdale in 1963.

== In popular culture ==
The TV series Hawaii Five-O and Magnum, P.I. featured several episodes where the temple is incorporated into the plot. The temple and its vicinity also served as a stand-in for South Korea in one episode of the ABC series Lost and as the Presidential Villa in an episode of seaQuest DSV.

The temple was also used in the 2001 movie Pearl Harbor as a replica of the Byodo-In Temple in Japan as well as several other movies.

== Gallery ==
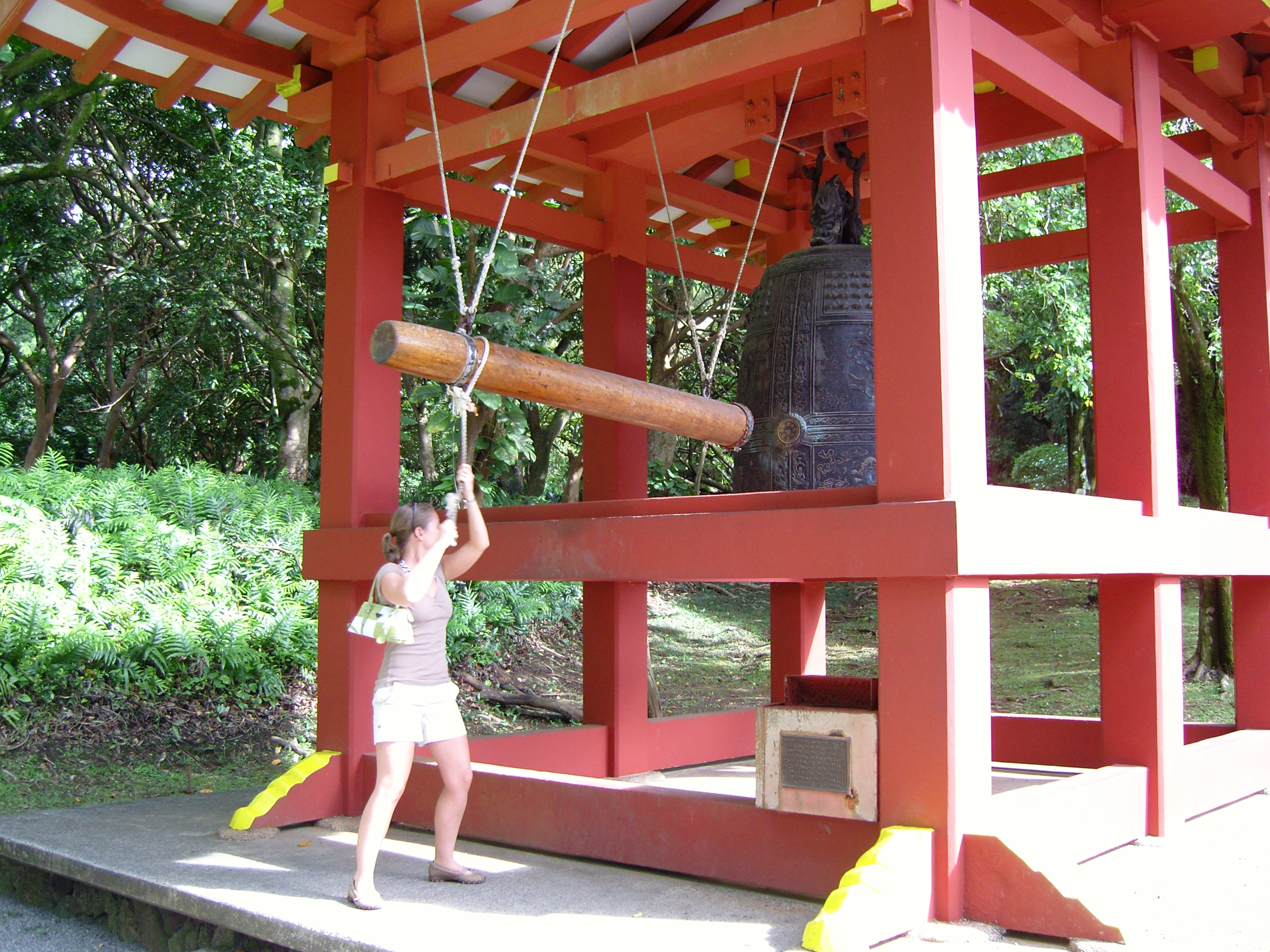
A woman rings the peace bell prior to entering.

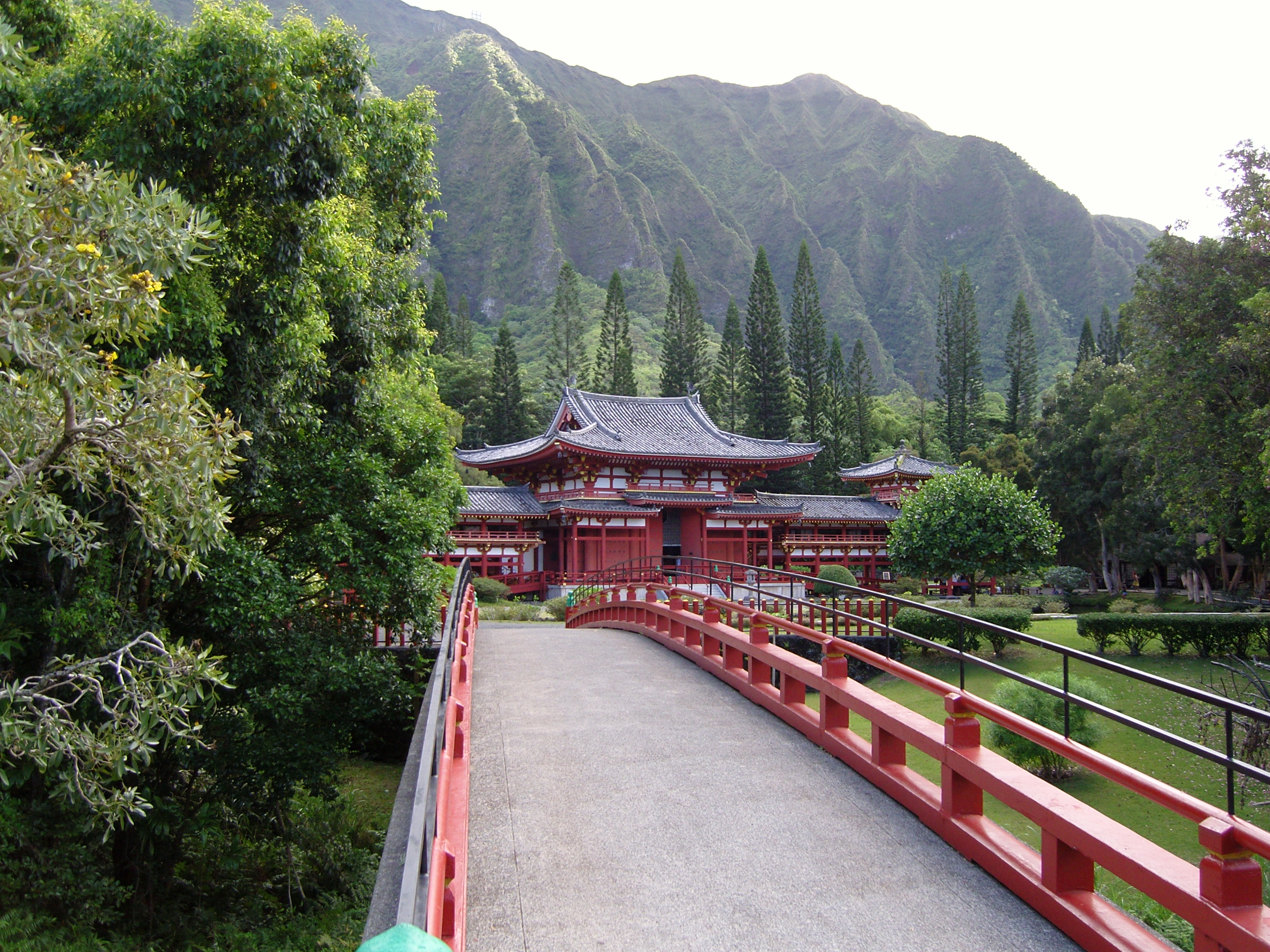
Byodo-In Temple as seen from the entrance bridge.

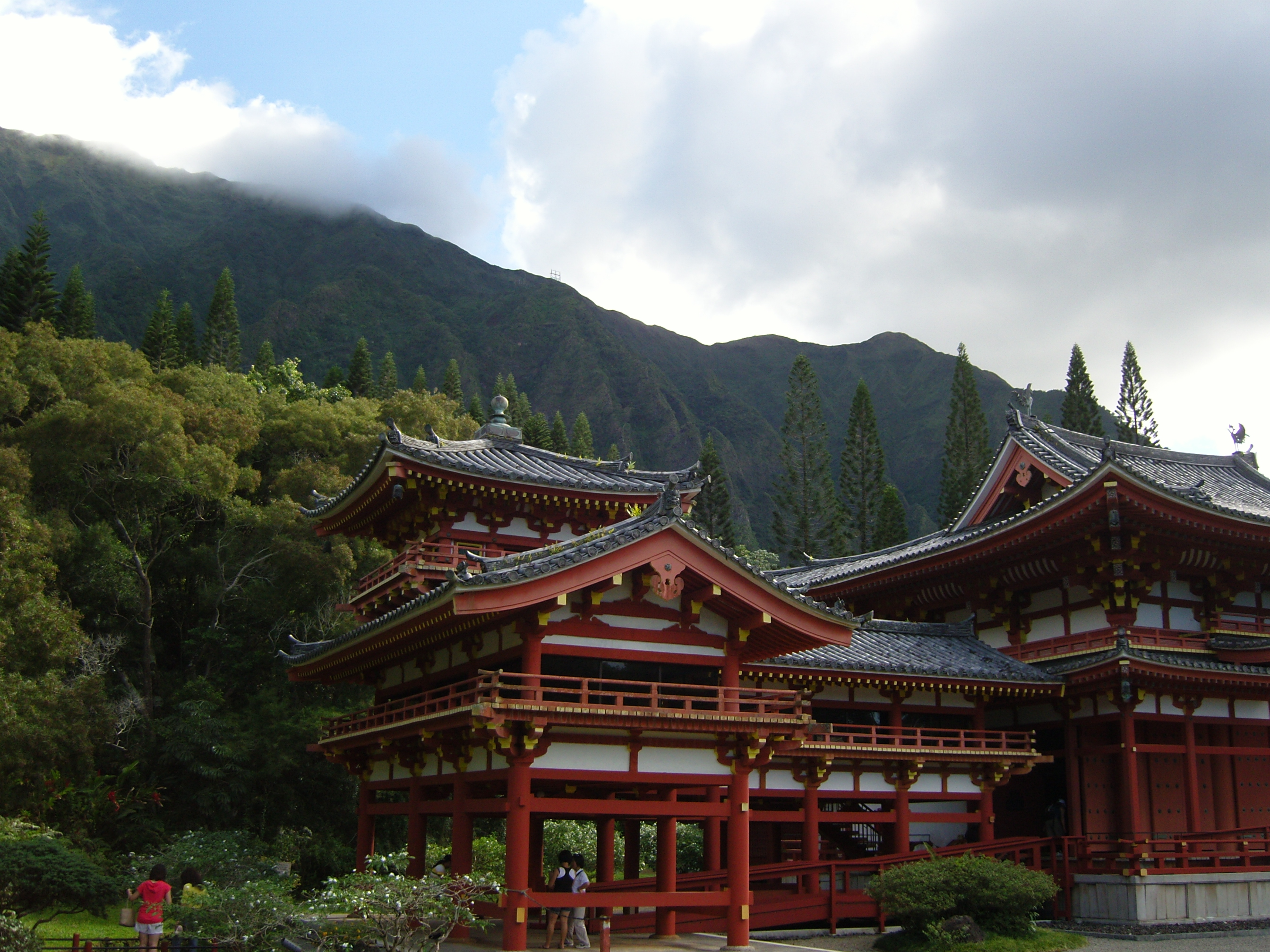
Mist-capped mountains loom above the temple.
