= Yōen jihō =

Japanese language newspaper published in Hawaii

Yōen jihō, also known as Koloa Times, was a Japanese language newspaper published from Koloa, Kauaʻi County, Hawaii. The first issue of the publication was issued on February 2, 1921. It was launched by the Kaua'i branch of the Federation of Japanese Labor in the aftermath of the 1920 sugar strike.

During its initial phase, the newspaper was published twice weekly. Yōen jihō was the most radical of the ethnic newspapers in the area at the time. It carried several articles on Marxism and Socialism. Ichiro Izuka served as the editor of the newspaper. Yōen jihō gained a circulation of 1,000. The newspaper was published by Yoen Jiho Sha Ltd.

In 1923 Reverend Seikan Higa, a Methodist pastor, shifted his residence to Koloa. He took over the management of Yōen jihō in 1925 or 1926. Higa then sold it to Chinyei Kinjo in 1928.

It continued publication until 1941. In its latter period G. Arashiro was the editor of the publication, which was issued weekly on Wednesdays. It had a circulation of 2,430. The newspaper folded on April 30, 1970, citing a decline in readership.
