= Hideyo =

- Gender: Male

Origin
- Origin: Japanese
- Meaning: Different meanings depending on the kanji used

Hideyo (written: 英世 or 秀世) is a masculine Japanese given name. Notable people with the name include:

- Hideyo Amamoto (天本 英世; 1926–2003), Japanese actor
- Hideyo Arita (有田 英世; 1929–2006), Japanese businessman
- Hideyo Arisaka (有坂 秀世; 1908–1952), Japanese linguist
- Hideyo Emori (江森 英世; born 1959), Japanese educator
- Hideyo Fudesaka (筆坂 秀世; born 1948), Japanese political commentator
- Hideyo Fujita (藤田 秀世; born 1964), Japanese actor
- Hideyo Hanazumi (花角 英世; born 1958), Japanese politician
- Hideyo Hayashi (林 英世; born 1963), Japanese actress
- Hideyo Kadoguchi (門口 秀世; born 1941), Japanese baseball player
- Hideyo Kawaharada (川原田 英世; born 1983), Japanese politician
- Hideyo Kuneida (國枝 秀世; born 1950), Japanese astronomer
- Hideyo Kurata (倉田 英世), Japanese author
- Hideyo Kurimoto (栗本 英世; born 1957), Japanese anthropologist
- Hideyo Kusuda (楠田 英世; 1831–1906), Japanese samurai
- Hideyo Mangetsu (満月 英世; born 1942), Japanese actor
- Hideyo Miyama (深山 英世; born 1957), Japanese businessman
- Hideyo Morimoto (森本 英世; born 1941), Japanese singer
- Hideyo Motoyama (本山 英世; 1925–2005), Japanese businessman
- Hideyo Naganuma (長沼 秀世; born 1937), Japanese economic historian
- Hideyo Noguchi (野口 英世; 1876–1928), Japanese bacteriologist
- Hideyo Noguchi (architect) (野口 秀世; 1954–2015), Japanese architect
- Hideyo Sasaki (politician) (佐々木 秀世; 1909–1986), Japanese politician
- Hideyo Sasaki (sound engineer) (佐々木 英世; born 1940), Japanese sound engineer
- Hideyo Sengoku (千石 英世; born 1949), Japanese literary critic
- Hideyo Sugimoto (杉本 英世; born 1938), Japanese golfer
- Hideyo Yamada (山田 英世; 1921–1982), Japanese philosopher
- Hideyo Yamaguchi (山口 英世; born 1934), Japanese mycologist
