= Azalia Emma Peet =

American educator

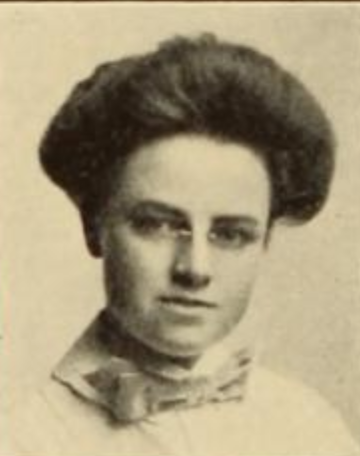
- Azalia Emma Peet, from the 1910 yearbook of Smith College
- Born: September 3, 1887; Webster, New York
- Died: September 21, 1973; Asheville, North Carolina
- Occupation(s): Educator, missionary

Azalia Emma Peet (September 3, 1887 – September 21, 1973) was an American missionary educator in Japan. During World War II, she was a "lone dissenter", "one of the very few white Americans" to speak out against the incarceration of Japanese Americans. She taught students at internment camps in Idaho and Oregon.

== Early life and education ==
Peet was born in Webster, New York, the daughter of James Clinton Peet and Marion Keeler Green Peet. She graduated from Smith College in 1910; during college she was a member of the "Oriental Society" with Smith's first Asian student, Tei Ninomiya. She took graduate courses at Boston University during a furlough in the early 1920s, and earned a master's degree in 1923. Her master's thesis title was "The application of certain American labor legislation to the industrial life of Japanese women and children" (1923).

== Career ==
Peet became a missionary in 1916, after her widowed father remarried, and sailed for Tokyo under the auspices of the Genesee Conference of the Methodist Episcopal Church. She worked in schools from kindergarten to high school level in Kagoshima, from 1917 to 1921. From 1923 to 1927, she taught women and girls at a hostel in Fukuoka, preparing them for higher education. The Woman's Foreign Missionary Society bought and shipped a piano to Peet in Fukuoka. In 1927 she supervised two kindergartens in Hakodate. She had a furlough in the United States for health reasons from 1928 to 1929. From 1929 to 1935 and from 1936 to 1941, she was back to teaching in Japan, until World War II, when she was evacuated along with other American citizens.

In the United States, she worked with Japanese immigrant families and students in Oregon. She testified before the House Select Committee Investigating National Defense Migration, voicing her opposition to the incarceration of Japanese and Japanese-American residents of the West Coast. “What is it that makes it necessary for them to evacuate?" she asked the committee. "Have they done anything? Is there anything in their history in this area to justify such a fear of them developing overnight?” "Progressive Christians like Peet were among the few dissenting voices," noted Buddhist scholar Duncan Ryuken Williams. Historian Ellen Eisenberg observed that, unlike clergymen in other cities, "Peet spoke as an individual, without any organizational support."

Like some other former missionaries with useful language, pedagogical and cultural skills, Peet worked at internment camps in Nyssa, Oregon and Minidoka, Idaho, mostly supporting teen students in their preparations for college. She returned to Japan from 1946 to 1953, to help with postwar reconstruction. She was awarded the Order of the Sacred Treasure (5th Class) by the Japanese government in 1953, for her lifetime of service.

== Publications ==
- "Pinafores and the King's Daughters" (1919)
- "Fragments from a Devotional Diary" (1935)

== Personal life ==
Peet lived in Rochester, New York after she retired from the mission field. She moved to a retirement home in Asheville, North Carolina in 1961. She died there in 1973, at the age of 86. Her papers, including photographs, diaries, and correspondence, are at Smith College.
