= Japanese Problem =

Racial tensions in Hawaii, United States

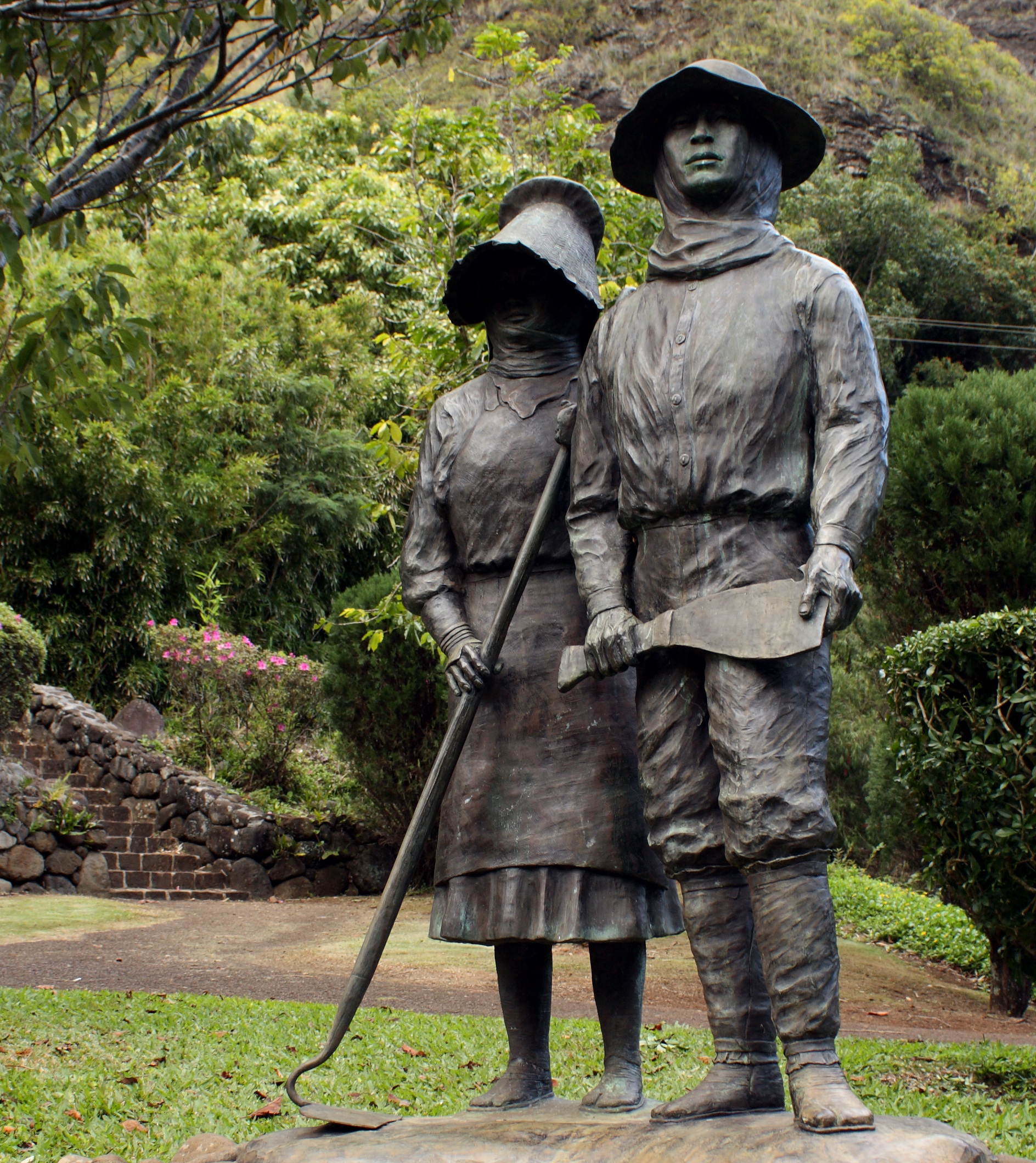
Bronze statue of Japanese sugarcane workers erected in 1985 on the centennial anniversary of the first Japanese immigration to Hawaii in 1885.

The Japanese Problem, also referred to as the Japanese Menace or the Japanese Conspiracy, was the name given to racial tensions in Hawaii between the European-American sugarcane plantation owners and the Japanese immigrants hired to work in the cane fields.

== Origins ==
The term "Japanese Problem" came into use during the 1920 Oahu Sugar Strike.

Following the strike, powerful European-Americans like Walter Dillingham and Harry Baldwin were vocal about their concerns regarding the increasing Japanese population in Hawaii. They worried that the increasing Japanese population would eventually affect politics in Hawaii as the voter base changed. Ultimately, they were most concerned that the Japanese were loyal to Japan, and would allow the Japanese Empire to claim Hawaii.

Wallace Farrington pointed out in a speech in 1920 that even though the strikes were caused by "malcontents and agitators", the Japanese had to be given the chance to Americanize. This notion was pushed back against by people both within Hawaii and on the U.S. Mainland, like Valentine McClatchy, who claimed that the Japanese could not integrate into American culture because they held on to their own culture and religion too fervently.

== See also ==
- Japanese in Hawaii
- Politics in Hawaii during the 1920s
- Yellow Peril
- Niihau incident
