= Chinyei Kinjo =

Okinawan journalist (1899–1987)

Chinyei Kinjo (金城珍栄)(December 21, 1899 – March 3, 1987) was a prominent Okinawan journalist. He ran the Yoen jiho for most of its 49-year history.

== Early life ==
Kinjo was born in Naha, Okinawa on December 21, 1899. He was the son of Chinzen Kinjo, one of the first Okinawan immigrants to Hawaii. Kinjo joined his father in Hawaii much later in life, after graduating from Naha City Business School in 1918. He worked in sugar plantations on Oahu for a few months before enrolling in Iolani School. In 1926, Seikan Higa invited Kinjo to manage a Japanese-language newspaper on Kauai called the Yoen jiho. The newspaper had a lot of unpaid bills at the time, so Kinjo went to plantation camps all over Kauai to solicit subscriptions from laborers. He became the owner and president of the newspaper in 1928.

Kinjo was also practiced karate. In 1934, he invited Chojun Miyagi to visit Hawaii and demonstrate karate. Miyagi's visit lasted eight months.

== Internment ==
In 1942, a few months after the attack on Pearl Harbor, Kinjo was arrested and interned by the United States government for his work as a Japanese journalist. There was also some suspicion that Kinjo and his co-worker Ginjiro Arashiro, the editor of the Yoen Jiho, were leading a group of Okinawan communists. This activity may have also led to his arrest, but the government's official finding was that while Kinjo had not "engaged in any subversive activity", he would be interned for the duration of the war anyway. Kinjo was first interned in Sand Island Internment Camp, then was transferred to the mainland. He was imprisoned at the Angel Island Detention Facility, Fort Sam Houston Internment Camp, Lordsburg Internment Camp, and Santa Fe Internment Camp throughout World War II. He returned to Hawaii in 1945.

== Post-war ==
After returning to Hawaii, Kinjo moved to Yoen jiho to Honolulu. They published a reopening issue in October 1948, and eventually established a new office downtown. Kinjo was hospitalized for eye surgery in 1965, and had to pause publication of the newspaper. He briefly revived it when he recovered in 1966, but closed it for good in April 1970, citing a decline in readership. After the newspaper closed, Kinjo worked for Central Pacific Bank. He was awarded the Order of the Sacred Treasure, 6th class, in 1968. He died on March 3, 1987.

== See also ==
- Tetsuo Toyama
