= Seikan Higa =

Personal details
- Born: August 7, 1887 Naha, Okinawa, Empire of Japan
- Died: 1985 (aged 97–98)
- Denomination: Methodist

Seikan Higa (比嘉静観) (August 7, 1887 – 1985) was a Methodist minister who was active in Hawaii. He was the first Okinawan minister to practice there.

== Early life ==
Higa was born on August 7, 1887, as "Gashu Higa" (比嘉賀秀) in Naha, Okinawa, Japan. Higa entered Fukuoka Baptist School in 1909, then transferred to the Tokyo Baptist Theological Seminary in Koishikawa, Tokyo. He graduated in 1911 and returned to Okinawa, where he became a minister at the Okinawa Baptist Church. Higa and Iha Fuyū founded the Okinawa Union Church in 1916. He then founded the Tokyo Labor Church in Tokyo in 1919.

== Hawaii ==
Higa was asked to come to Hawaii to spread the gospel by Dr. Schwartz in 1921. Higa left two of his four children in Japan with his mother, and moved his family to Hawaii. He settled in Honolulu, and established the Palama Methodist Church. He was the first Okinawan minister to preach in Hawaii. He encouraged the coexistence of Buddhism and Christianity, and spoke out about social welfare issues, such as promoting birth control. His views meant that he sometimes clashed with fellow influential Okinawan Tetsuo Toyama. After visiting the mainland United States in 1924, he was inspired to start the Hawaii Reimei Kyokai (New Dawn Church). He traveled frequently because he was often invited to preach on other islands.

In May 1925 or 1926, Higa purchased the Yoen Jiho, a Japanese language newspaper on Kauai. Three years later, in 1928, he sold it to the newspaper's chief editor at the time, Chinyei Kinjo, and returned to Honolulu.

Higa moved to the Big Island in 1930 to become the principal of the Pi'ihonua Japanese school. In 1936, Higa was asked to become principal of the Honokaa Japanese School. He was the principal of the school until World War II broke out in 1941, and all Japanese language schools were closed. When the war ended, Higa moved back to Honolulu, where he was the principal of the Waialae Japanese School. He was then asked to serve as the minister for the Japanese service at the Wesley Methodist Church in Honolulu in 1949. He served there until 1972, when he retired.

After retirement, Higa wrote for Japanese newspapers and magazines, and continued public speaking.

Higa was awarded the Order of the Sacred Treasure in 1968, on the same day that Tetsuo Toyama received the same award.

Higa died on July 3, 1985.

== Bibliography ==
Higa wrote poetry under the literary name "Seikan Higa"

- Higa, Seikan (1922). Seimei no bakuon. Honolulu, Hawaii: Jitsugyō no Hawaisha..
- Higa, Seikan (1924). 赤い 戀 [Red romance]. Honolulu, Hawaii: Jitsugyo no Hawaiisha.
- Seikan, Higa (1927). 自顔 [My face]. Koloa, Hawaii: Yōen Jihōsha.
