= Tetsuo Toyama =

Okinawan journalist (1883–1971)

Tetsuo Toyama (当山 哲夫, Toyama Tetsuo; April 8, 1883 – May 29, 1971) was an Okinawan journalist.

== Biography ==
Toyama was born on Ikei Island in Okinawa, Japan on April 8, 1883. He was recruited in the Japanese military in 1904 and served in Manchuria during the Russo-Japanese war. He was discharged after he suffered a gunshot wound. After leaving the military, he decided to immigrate to Hawaii in 1906. He worked on a plantation in Kekaha, Kauai. He worked several side jobs before moving to the Big Island and working as a reporter for the Hilo Shimbun in 1909. He began publishing a magazine called Jitsugyo no Hawai in 1912. He used this publication to stand up for planation workers and improve the lot of Okinawan immigrants, and thus enjoyed a healthy readership. He then published a directory of Okinawan organizations in 1919 that also proved to be successful.

In 1929, Toyama and his publications became entangled in an event later called the "Nakaima Incident". An election was being held in Okinawa that featured far-left and far-right candidates. He was asked by influential Okinawans on both sides to help raise support for their campaigns. Shuncho Higa, an Okinawan journalist who supported the left-wing candidate, had helped Toyama when he first arrived in Hawaii. However, Toyama wrote articles saying that Ichiro Nakaima, a lecturer Higa had invited to Hawaii, was a communist. He also tried to have him deported, but the case was dismissed on March 12, 1930. This incident split the Okinawan community, and Toyama had earned himself a bad reputation.

In 1941, after the attack on Pearl Harbor, Toyama was arrested and the Jitsugyo no Hawai was closed. He was initially incarcerated in the Sand Island Internment Camp, but over the course of World War II he was sent to six camps operated by the Department of Justice, Jerome War Relocation Center, and Amache Relocation Center. Toyama converted to Christianity while incarcerated, and was initially paroled to Lincoln, Nebraska so that he could study theology at Union College. He eventually returned to Hawaii in November 1945.

After the passage of the McCarran-Walter Immigration Act, Toyama became one of the first Japanese immigrants to become a naturalized American citizen. He also started a new newspaper, the Shimin, which encouraged people to naturalize and combated communism. He held classes and assisted many people with their citizenship applications. He was awarded the Order of the Sacred Treasure, fifth class, on June 14, 1968, the same day as fellow Okinawan immigrant Seikan Higa.

Toyama closed Shimin and retired in 1970. He wrote a memoir, which was published in Japan just before his death on May 29, 1971.

== Bibliography ==
- Toyama, Tetsuo (1971). Eighty years in Hawaii. Tokyo: Tosho Print. Co.

== See also ==
- Chinyei Kinjo
