= 1920 Politics (Hawaii) =

Racist political strategy in Hawaii

1920 Politics also referred to as "Jim Crow" circa 1930, was a Republican political strategy to reassert the authority of the white race and promote American Anglo-Saxon values, in what was then the US Territory of Hawaii.

== Strike of 1920 ==
Before 1920 Hawaii was divided into various nationalist groups of Whites, Hawaiians, Chinese, Portuguese, Japanese, Okinawans, Filipinos, and Koreans.

At the time white nationalism by Republicans had been an acceptable position. Since annexation, Hawaii's white-dominated oligarchy comprised three branches: the HSPA and Big Five sugar plantations dominated economics, the Republican Party dominated politics, and the white minority dominated society. These organs supported each other: one important example was that the plantations were a crucial source of Republican votes. On Election Day, the crude election booths allowed plantation management to survey which worker voted Republican or not; those who did not were disciplined or fired. While several workers had the right to vote, they valued their livelihood more than their right to choose their candidate.

Racism was not only a social issue but more importantly an economic one. Hawaii's plantation economy relied on the ready availability of cheap labor to work the fields, and any increase in wages was costly as pay was distributed over the large work force. For the white planters, the two largest groups — the Japanese and Filipinos — rivaled each other, dividing the labor force so that when one group went on strike the other would become strike breakers. But in 1920 the Japanese and Filipinos reconciled their differences and joined in the dual strike of 1920.

== Farrington ==
After the 1920 strike, greater attention was given to the Asian majority. At the time, half of public school students were of Japanese ancestry. The white minority petitioned Governor Charles J. McCarthy for racial segregation to prevent their children for being exposed to what they believed to be the "corrupting influences" of the colored students. McCarthy had little sympathy for the immigrant Asian population and agreed to create English Standard Schools for whites and some Hawaiians, who were given privileges over students attending the more prevalent public schools. Republican Governor Wallace Rider Farrington came to power, stating that the “Racial elements are out of balance and seriously in need of adjusting”. Republicans feared that a united labor force would take over the economy and eventually the political system, overturning the plantation economy, race hierarchy, and social values of Hawaii. The previous strategy known as Divide-and-Control had failed. Republicans created a new strategy to prevent majority rule. Divide-and-Control was unstable since it relied on different ethnicities confronting each other. Instead of Divide-and-Control, where Japanese identity was the center of the Japanese community and the Filipino identity was the center of the Filipino community, the 1920 Politics strategy was to Americanize the Japanese and Filipino communities to disconnect them from their own identity, to adopt a Western identity and to further the power of the white population.

The Filipinos were considered a mongrel race, the result of Asian and Hispanic mixing that produced a primitive people of low intelligence. People of Japanese origin were regarded as a pure race and better organized, despite being described as "paganistic barbarians". Armed with this logic, Republicans decided to assimilate the Japanese first and then the Filipinos. The logic of the campaign was that, after the Japanese had been assimilated, the Filipinos, with their limited mental capacity, would be too weak to oppose the movement. If they concentrated on trying to assimilate the Filipinos first, it was likely that they would turn to the Japanese to arrange resistance to the campaign. Even if the Filipinos were broken, the Republicans would still have to challenge the Japanese who had organized the Filipinos.

=== Japanese ===
Farrington's strategy was to target the schools and the next generations while the plantations dealt with the adults by promoting Christianity, thereby converting the ethnically Japanese population to the predominant American religion.

Immigrants to Hawaii usually encountered Christian groups proselytizing to newcomers, but with plantation owners allowing high tolerance for the immigrants’ culture, these immigrants continued to follow their own religions. During the strike of 1920, Buddhist and Shinto churches took the risk of supporting the striking workers. Christian churches on the other hand wanted to maintain good relations with the plantation owners and opposed the strike.

A solution was proposed by Umetaro Okumura as a means to assimilate the Japanese population: with his father Reverend Takie Okumura, he proposed evangelicalizing the Japanese community. Once converted to Christianity, the planters could manipulate the Japanese through the churches and discourage their workers from criticizing poor conditions, leaving the labor force, requesting pay raises, and creating unions. An additional advantage to Okumura was if he was effective in converting the Japanese community into a Christian fundamentalist society, it gave him the opportunity to become the theocratic leader over the Japanese.

The white oligarchy believed that Japanese would always believe another ethnic Japanese, this being a primitive but effective defense amongst a people of limited intelligence. Believing Takie Okumura could gain acceptance as a Japanese and infiltrate the Japanese community to carry out his agenda, the oligarchy gave its support to Okumura. He received support from planters brothers William and George Castle, former Republican governors George Carter, Walter Frear, and the governor at that time, Farrington. In exchange for higher productivity the Evangelical churches would be financially secured by the plantations and Republican would give government support in the spread and influence of Christianity.

Okumura was an avid opponent of the unions, and he refused to shelter or aid strikers following the evictions. His philosophy was that to use labor unions to challenge the white-dominated power structure might produce immediate gains but at a long-term loss, as a hostile relationship with the power holders would cause difficulties in the future. Instead, he believed in enduring the immediate hardships and accepting white-dominated authorities, becoming Americanized and Christianized, so that they could say ‘your country is my country; your God is my God’. Okumura believed deeply in the rule of law, and under the Republican administration he made a crusade of ridding Honolulu of prostitution and gambling. Since 1919, labor unions had been categorized as organized crime. To Okumura, they were the rural counterpart to Honolulu's syndicates and the unionists and pagan priests that supported them were no better than the pimps and gangsters of Honolulu.

In 1921, Farrington applied new requirements for school emphasizing the teaching of English Language, American History, and democracy. In 1923, the Government passed Act 30, Act 171, and in 1925 Act 152. The Acts limited the range of subjects taught and put financial pressure on Foreign language schools. Okumura was appointed to a committee to regulate the Language school text books.

In January 1921, Okumura began an “Education Campaign” to coax Japanese into Christianity by attempting to persuade them of its similarities to Japanese culture and to promote a strong work ethic. Okumura initially convinced Buddhists clergy and Japanese businessmen to support the program, believing Okumura was taking an initiative to reconcile tensions between the two faiths and join to alleviate hostilities between Whites and Japanese.

The campaign was flawed from the start, since it was known that Okumura opposed the 1920 strike and sided with planters. It was also known that the plantations were providing Okumura and his colleagues with facilities and paying their expenses, Okumura's close relations with the planters raising distrust amongst the Japanese. The Japanese unionists began to reject Okumura as a “traitor” and “betrayer”. Many did not go the programs and those who did found it taught them to become subservient workers. Amongst Okumura's teachings was to reject materialism and value their role in society. However, this approach met with an adverse reaction from an audience with few possessions and low social status, and Okumura was accused of being a propagandist for the wealthy social elite. Buddhist priests were irate to discover the Christian agenda to convert Buddhists and that Umetaro Okumura was discussing with the planters the ways to restrict Buddhist practices and close Buddhist churches on plantation land. Okumura was also known for his offensive remarks toward Buddhists, in which he described them as “alien” and “pagan”. Instead of attracting the Japanese to Christianity to correct their supposed spiritual flaws, the criticisms deepened their devotion to Buddhism or Shinto and their rejection of Christianity.

The integration program was based largely on the Haole-Hawaiian Alliance. Since the missionaries of the 1820s, the Hawaiian religion, which was regarded as "primitive", was easily overcome by Christianity. Hawaiians had disowned their heritage, traded Hawaiian values for American values, and adopted English, driving the Hawaiian language to near extinction. Hawaiians were regarded as the proper colored Americans and model second class citizens, and for this they were given opportunities and rewards for their subservience. But in the eyes of the Evangelicals, the Japanese were frustratingly irrational, voluntarily subjecting themselves to unnecessary hardship and discrimination by their refusal to forgo their heritage and religious beliefs. The Evangelicals believed that what they regarded as the Japanese community's mutinous and hostile attitudes were what kept them third-class citizens and barred them for the advantages enjoy by other Hawaiians.

The foreign languages controversy was decided by the U.S. Supreme Court in 1927 in Farrington v. Tokushige. A judgement was made on Farrington's and the Republicans' interpretation of American values, that certain people who deserved freedoms should receive them, while those whom they believed to have abused their rights should not. The languages schools were believed to be an abuse of the American freedom to perpetuate un-American views. The case was regarded as exposing hypocritical attitudes and for being an embarrassment, and the Supreme Court disagreed with the Hawaiian government and found Farrington violating the same values he was imposing. For Farrington and the Republicans, Okumura proved himself a liability more than an asset, and they disassociated themselves from him.

With little progress and after the publicizing of the result of the Supreme Court case, the Planters reanalyzed the Education Campaign and began to doubt Okumura's effectiveness, and complained he had made the Japanese more skeptical of American culture, and more belligerent, than before. The Planters even accused Okumura of being a double agent, because rather than making the Japanese submissive workers and solving the "Japanese Problem", he appeared to have exacerbated the conflict and put Whites and Japanese further at odds. The planters discontinued funding Okumura's campaign in 1927 and Okumura ended it in 1929.

== Judd ==
Shortly before Lawrence M. Judd became governor, in July 1929, a series of events revived 1920 Politics. In 1928 a ten-year-old white boy named George Gill Jamieson was kidnapped and murdered by a 19-year-old Japanese man, Myles Fukunaga, who was executed after Judd became governor. In 1931, a white woman named Thalia Massie, claimed to have been raped by five or six Hawaiians. In a separate incident on the same night of the rape, five non-white men were put on trial, which ended in a hung jury. After the trial, one suspect, Horace Ida, was beaten, and another was shot and killed. The killers of the latter, Joseph Kahahawai, involved Massie's mother and husband and two other navy men. After pressure from Congress and the white community, Judd communed their sentences of 10 years to one hour in his office. The Japanese compared the petition for clemency of Fukunaga, a colored man, who killed a white person, to Massie's parents and cohorts: whites, who had killed a colored person. Not even the white community was satisfied with the uneven handling of the two cases. Judd was criticized for giving a commutation, not a pardon, and although the difference in the two rulings was negligible, it was widely believed that Judd was not committed to the belief that Massie's avengers should be punished for their crime.

Following these events, Judd and the Republican government had to reassure the white minority in Hawaii, and whites nationally, of their safety. Under Farrington, the Hawaiians were exempted from the 1920 Politics by the Haole-Hawaiian Alliance. But after the Massie Affair, doubts arose over entrusting the power of authority to the Hawaiians. Under Alliance, Hawaiians were able to receive government jobs which had included police officers and prison guards. But, after examining these positions, U.S. Attorney General Seth Richardson found an incompetent police force and sympathetic prison guards. The Hawaiians had betrayed the trust of the white leadership to carry out their demands, were regarded as a liability and phased out by whites. Further pressure to Americanize Hawaii came from a renewed attempt at statehood.

=== Japanese ===
Under Judd, a new 1920 Politics strategy was implemented against the Japanese population, which was to ignore them. This change had several causes. Judd had learned from Farrington's social attack, which had been intended to subordinate the Japanese community (which largely consisted of manual laborers and domestic servants), instead made them feel anti-American. Similarly, Buddhists and Shintos became anti-Christian. At the same time, whites became increasingly anti-Japanese and Christians anti-Buddhist. The attempted resolution to the problem concluded in a lawsuit that the Territory lost, thereby failing in its plan to assimilate the Japanese community through a policy of subordination.

In addition to avoiding conflict with the Japanese majority was the prospect of future statehood, and the incitement of civil unrest would not represent Hawaii positively to Congress. Furthermore, the statehood committee made a conscious effort to avoid discussion of the unassimilated Japanese.

One of the fears of the failure of the assimilation policy was soon realized: Japanese laborers left the plantations at the earliest opportunity and established their own shops and small businesses, and felt no need to assimilate as they already formed the majority of the population. Another fear arose: that if the Japanese became more politically active, their higher population size meant they would dominate the vote. Senator Hiram Bingham III, grandson of Hiram Bingham I, preferred the islands of his birth to remain in Caucasian hands rather than let democracy shift power into the hands of the Japanese. In 1932, he proposed a possible solution to Congress, in a bill to make Hawaii a military territory under the U.S. Navy. It would have discontinued elections until Hawaii could be settled by Caucasians.

For many Japanese in the 1930s, minimal privacy at the voting stations, voter intimidation by Republicans that risked one's job and livelihood, and a choice between anti-immigrant Democrats or white supremacist Republicans, resulted in more than 90% of Japanese-Americans deciding not to vote.

Under the new policy, the Japanese community was allowed to practice its traditions, culture, and religion relatively unharassed by the government, planters, and Americanizing Christian organizations, on the condition that they did not interfere with the white community. The Christian movement was met with a strong counter-movement as the Japanese rejected Christianity as a ploy by the Planters to subordinate them. This created a resurgence of Buddhism in the 1930s, which Christians dubbed “re-paganization”. Japanese businessmen helped finance Buddhists and Shinto ministries to move off the plantations to become more autonomous and form a strong Buddhist establishment. At its height, Buddhists accounted for one-third of the territory's population. Students continued to be subjected to right-wing speakers in schools, and Japanese were rewarded for showing progress in assimilating. Although the situation was judged to be far from satisfactory, the Japanese generally preferred Judd's neglect over persecution under Farrington. Conversely, Judd received criticism by the largely white evangelical community, that Buddhists and Shintos were allowed to practice their religion freely, even in public, without being challenged or in fear of governmental interference.

By the end of the 1930s, a problem with the Haoles arose: the strategy of ignoring the Japanese meant that whites who were unaware of 1920s Politics did not consider Japanese to be a menace to American society. Some whites became interested in eastern traditions, took a curiosity in Buddhist beliefs, and considered intermarriage with Japanese people. However, concerns were expressed about what was perceived to be the erosion of traditional values by “Japanese Minded” Whites.

=== Filipinos ===
Since the Great Depression, the treatment of Filipinos was particularly harsh, as they were considered the most inferior of the Asian race. As a result, acts of defiance such as striking, unionizing, or protesting were resolved with deportation back to the Philippines. Furthermore, around 6,000 Filipinos were unemployed in Hawaii, further reducing their collective bargaining power. Unlike the Japanese, most Filipinos still worked in the plantations, and without Pablo Manlapit, the labor movement collapsed.

A product of the Great Depression was the Wagner Act that was signed into law in 1935, despite strong efforts by the Big Five and Hawaii Republicans to lobby against it. In response, Hawaii's Republican-controlled government flatly refused to acknowledge the Act, claiming that, as Hawaii was a territory, and not a state, the law did not apply. However, in 1937, Hawaii was forced to implement the Wagner Act by the federal government.

Despite the Depression a successful wild cat strike occurred in Puunene, Maui, resulting in others strikes on Molokai, Hamakua, Kahuku, and Kekaha.

== World War II ==
Politicians continued to wait for an answer on statehood; the 1930s turned into the 1940s with no decisive answer forthcoming, and any serious discussion of racial inequality in Hawaii remained in reserve of an affirmative decision on statehood.

== Quinn ==
Under William F. Quinn, who became governor in 1957, senior politicians in Hawaii became open about bringing an end to 1920 Politics. Quinn was not only been a member of the Republican Club, a faction of the Party opposed to 1920 Politics, but had been the second leader of the club. After the sweeping losses of the election of 1954, Republicans had to change their political strategy in order to survive.
