= Chozaburo Kusumoto =

Japanese scientist, physician and university president

Chōzaburō Kusumoto
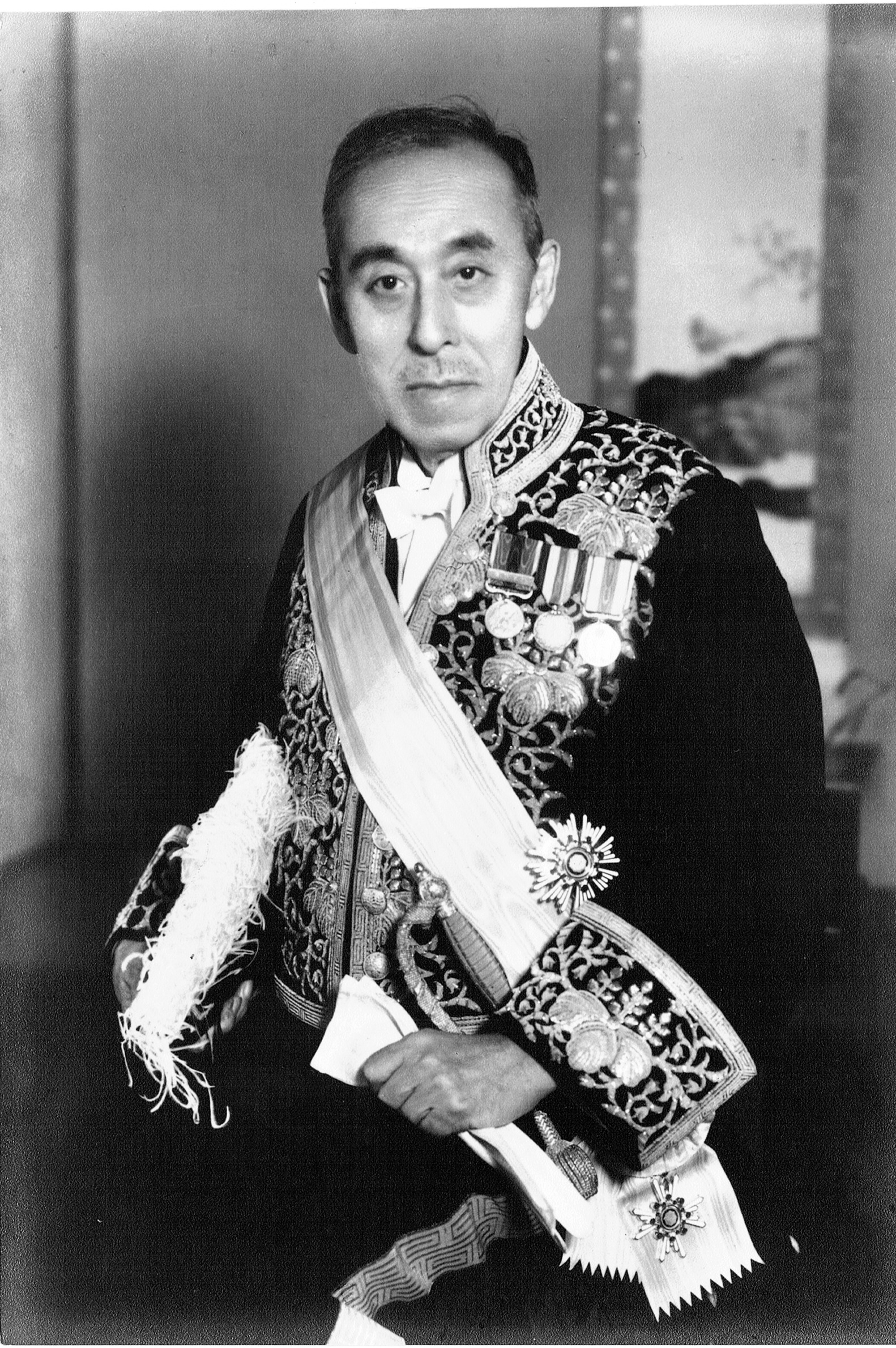
- Professor Kusumoto in court dress, c. 1943
- Born: March 10, 1871; Shichikama, Saikai, Nishisonogi District, Nagasaki
- Died: December 6, 1946 (age 75); Osaka
- Scientific career
- Fields: Medicine

Translated from the corresponding article in the Japanese Wikipedia. May be expanded

Kusumoto Chōzaburō (Japanese: 楠本長三郎) (10 March 1871 – 6 December 1946) was a Japanese scientist, physician and the second president of Osaka Imperial University. He was the founder of Osaka Medical College, and oversaw the elevation of the school from a prefectural college to an imperial university. In establishing the Research Institute for Microbial Diseases and the Institute of Scientific and Industrial Research, he greatly contributed to the expansion of Osaka Imperial University.

== Early life ==
Kusumoto was born in the village of Shichikama, later incorporated into the town of Saikai, in Nishisonogi District, Nagasaki on 10 March 1871, or the 20th day of the first month by the old calendar then still in use. The second son of Kusumoto Gansho, he lost his father at an early age and was raised by his mother and grandfather, who himself died in October 1882, leaving his mother to raise four children alone. However, with her support he graduated from a private junior high school in Omura in 1889 and from its First Higher School in 1896. In December 1900, he graduated from the medical school of Tokyo Imperial University.

== Doctor ==
Following his graduation, Kusumoto worked as a teaching assistant in the medical school until April 1905, when he took up the post of medical director and instructor in the medical school of Osaka Prefectural Higher School. In March 1906, he left for Germany to undertake further studies, returning in October 1907. While in Germany, Kusumoto studied the Zarichin effect of the relationship between bile and fecal hyperlipidemia in regards to diet. He also conducted research on Vitamin B1 after his return to Japan. In December 1909, he was awarded a doctorate from Tokyo Imperial University for a paper "concerning the occurrence of bleeding in the kidney". However, Kusumoto's inclinations were more towards clinical studies rather than research. He always made efforts to be courteous while treating the patient, as he had often noted doctors seemed to regard clinical studies as more of a hobby than a true duty. Even after he became a university president, he was noted for his kindness towards patients.

== Professor ==
In February 1917, Kusumoto became an instructor at a public vocational school; joining the faculty of Osaka Medical College as a pathology professor in November 1919, he became its dean in May 1924 and director of the college hospital in October. After becoming dean of the medical college, he strenuously worked towards the recognition of Osaka University as an imperial university, including taking a six-month tour of Western countries from April 1930 to study their universities. After returning home, he and the university faculty with the cooperation of public and private sectors and the Osaka business community, promoted the concept of Osaka Imperial University to Prime Minister Hamaguchi. On 1 May 1931, with the support of Finance Minister Jun'nosuke Inoue et al. the government donated ¥ 185 million, equal to over $1.1 billion in the present day; this, in addition to donations from Osaka totalling ¥ 95 million, enabled the establishment of the university.

== University president ==
As the progenitor of Osaka Imperial University, Kusumoto had much popular support from many in the community to become the new institution's first president. However, the Minister of Education instead supported Hantaro Nagaoka upon a recommendation from RIKEN. Though Hantaro was himself hesitant to assume the role, it was finally agreed Kusumoto would be his successor, and Hantaro would retire as soon as possible. Kusumoto became the second president of the university in June 1934. In September, he established the Research Institute for Microbial Diseases with donations from the business community, and headed a group to study cancer treatment in August 1935. The study group began cancer treatment research by buying 3g of radium from Czechoslovakia, which was widely reported in newspapers. He was appointed Director of the Institute of the Japan Society for the Promotion of Disaster Science of Osaka Imperial University in January 1937. In November 1939, the Industry, Science and Research Association/Institute of Scientific and Industrial Research was formed. As a result of discussions with the President of Nippon Life Insurance, Naruse Ogata, in September 1942 Tekijuku land and buildings of the current Ogata Koan were donated to Kusumoto.

== Last years ==
Kusumoto retired in February 1943, becoming an emeritus professor in May. He died at the hospital he had helped establish on 6 December 1946, aged 75.

== Honours ==
- Showa Coronation Medal - November 1928
- Grand Cordon of the Order of the Sacred Treasure - February 1943 (Second Class: April 1936; Third Class: March 1928; Fourth Class: March 1922; Fifth Class: December 1914; Sixth Class: October 1906)

=== Order of precedence ===
- Senior third rank (February 1943)
- Third rank (April 1938)
- Senior fourth rank (March 1933)
- Fourth rank (August 1926)
- Senior fifth rank (April 1921)
- Fifth rank (December 1915)
- Senior sixth rank (September 1908)

== Kusumoto Award ==
Upon Kusumoto's retirement in February 1943, the "Association Memorial Scholarship of Former President Kusumoto" was set up, funded by individuals and the business community. In March 1945, Dr. Kusumoto Memorial Scholarship Foundation was established and in December of the same year the foundation set up Kusumoto Award to "inherit the will of his tenure, to subsidize and promote the development of natural sciences and humanities". The award has been presented every year to the excellent graduates from each of the faculties and departments of Osaka University.
