= Order of the Sacred Treasure =

Honor bestowed by the government of Japan

Order of the Sacred Treasure 瑞宝章
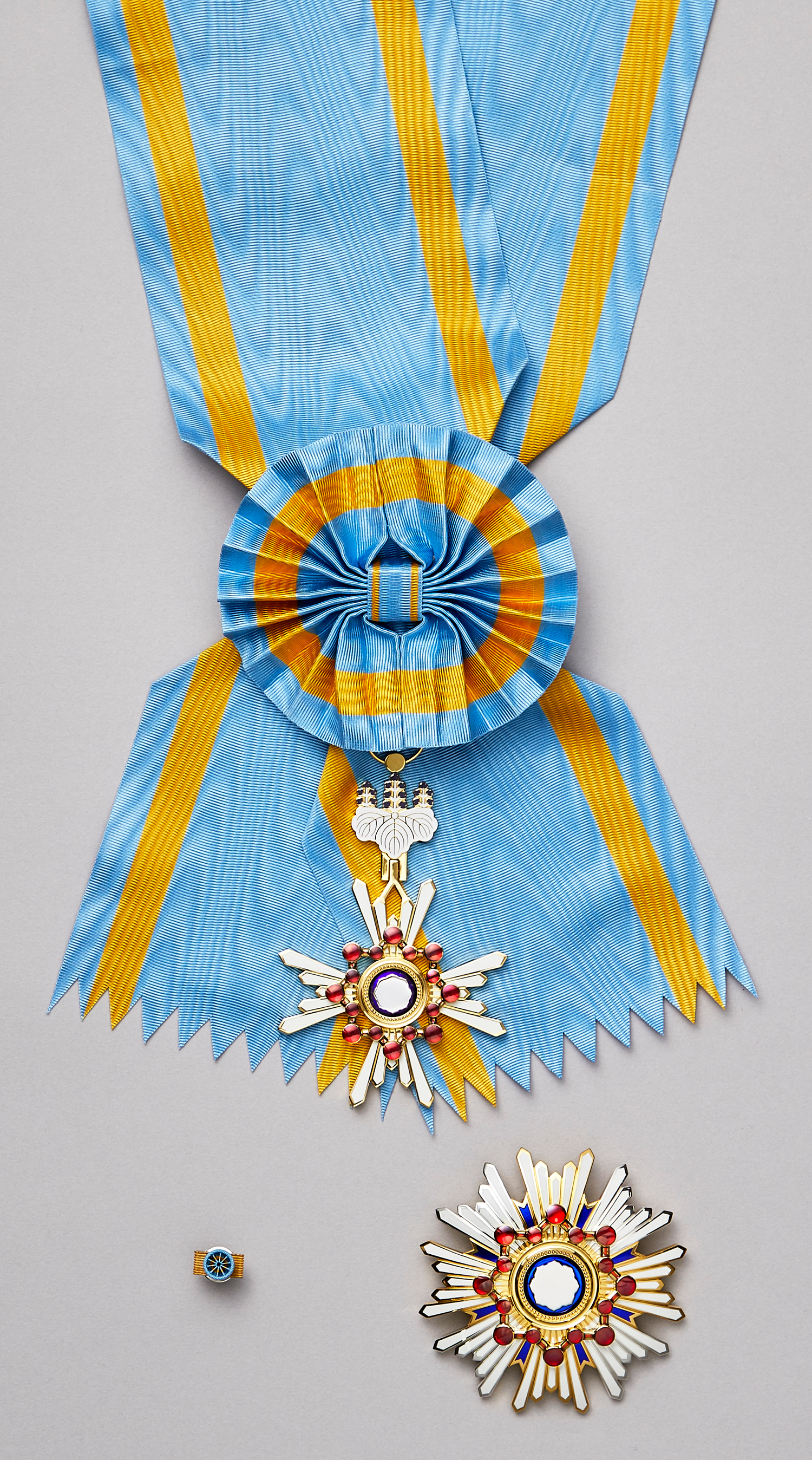
- Grand Cordon of the Order of the Sacred Treasure (1st class)

Awarded by the Emperor of Japan
- Type: Order
- Awarded for: Long-term contribution to public service or to a non-public service equivalent to public service.
- Status: Currently constituted
- Sovereign: HM The Emperor
- Grades: 1st through 8th Class (1888–2003); Since 2003: Grand Cordon; Gold and Silver Star (Rays, Principal Grade); Gold Rays with Neck Ribbon (Cordon, Middle Grade); Gold Rays with Rosette (Cordon, Junior Grade); Gold and Silver Rays (Double Rays); Silver Rays (Single Ray)

Precedence
- Next (higher): Order of the Paulownia Flowers
- Equivalent: Order of the Rising Sun; Order of the Precious Crown
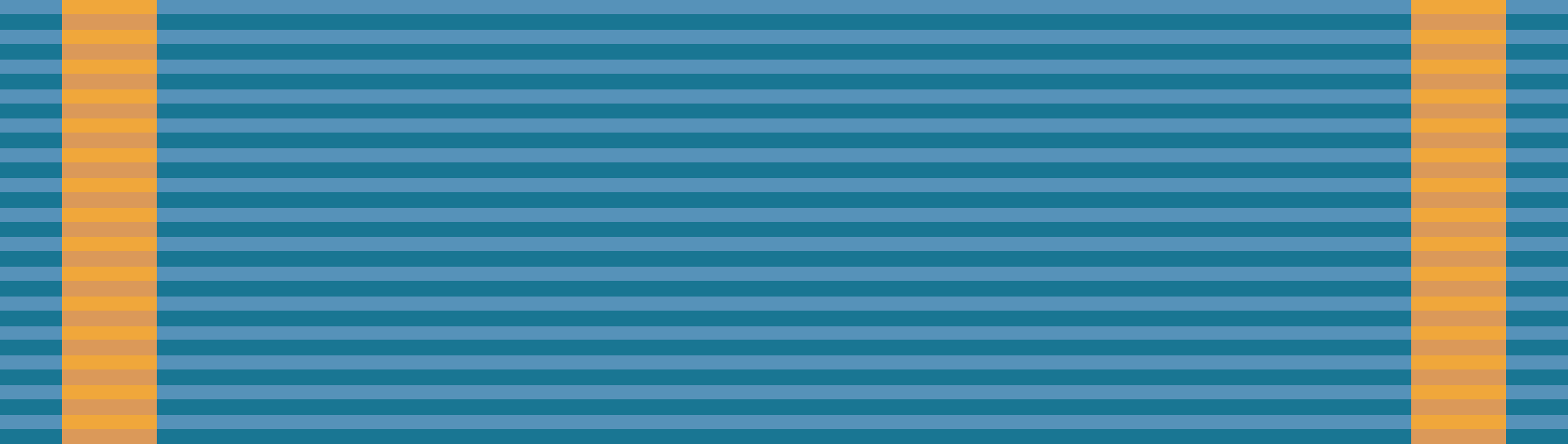
- Ribbon of the Order of the Sacred Treasure – new type

The Order of the Sacred Treasure (瑞宝章, Zuihō-shō) is a Japanese order, established on 4 January 1888 by Emperor Meiji as the Order of Meiji. Originally awarded in eight classes (from 8th to 1st, in ascending order of importance), since 2003 it has been awarded in six classes, the lowest two medals being abolished that year. Originally a male-only decoration, the order has been made available to women since 1919.

The Order of the Sacred Treasure, which had 8 ranks until 2003, was awarded as a slightly lower rank than the Order of the Rising Sun for men and the Order of the Precious Crown for women. For example, the 1st class of the Order of the Sacred Treasure has been treated as between the 1st class and the 2nd class of the Order of the Rising Sun and the Order of the Precious Crown, and the 2nd class of the Order of the Sacred Treasure has been treated as between the 2nd class and the 3rd class of the Order of the Rising Sun and the Order of the Precious Crown.

Since 2003, the Order of the Sacred Treasure has been given the same rank as the Order of the Rising Sun. The Order of the Rising Sun is awarded with an emphasis on achievements to the state, and the Order of the Sacred Treasure is awarded with an emphasis on long-term public service. Since military achievements are not included in the criteria for awarding the Order of the Rising Sun, Japan Self-Defense Forces personnel are awarded the Order of the Sacred Treasure for their long service in public service. For example, the Chief of Staff, Joint Staff, the highest rank in the JSDF, receives the Grand Cordon of the Order of the Sacred Treasure (1st class). The Order of the Sacred Treasure is awarded to persons who have been engaged for many years in the public service of the national and local governments, or in the following non-public services that are equivalent to public service, and who have accumulated distinguished service.

- Work directly involved in education or research at school.
- Work directly involved in social welfare at various facilities.
- Work directly involved in medical care or health guidance
- Work commissioned by the national or local governments, such as conciliation commissioners, volunteer probation officers, and welfare commissioners.
- Work that is extremely dangerous.
- Work in an extremely mentally or physically demanding environment.
- Work in an obscure field other than those listed in the preceding items.

Since 2003, the number representing rank included in the official name of the order was removed. As a result, although numbers representing ranks were sometimes used in common names, the formal names such as 勲一等 (Kun-ittō, First Class) and 勲二等 (Kun-nitō, Second Class) were no longer used.

== Classes ==
Before 2003, the Order could be awarded in any of eight classes. In 2003 the seventh and eighth classes were dissolved, leaving six. Conventionally, a diploma is prepared to accompany the insignia of the order, and in some rare instances, the personal signature of the emperor will have been added. As an illustration of the wording of the text, a translation of a representative 1929 diploma says:

"By the grace of Heaven, Emperor of Japan, seated on the throne occupied by the same dynasty from time immemorial,

We confer the Second Class of the Imperial Order of Meiji upon Henry Waters Taft, a citizen of the United States of America and a director of the Japan Society of New York, and invest him with the insignia of the same class of the Order of the Double Rays of the Rising Sun, in expression of the good will which we entertain towards him.

"In witness whereof, we have hereunto set our hand and caused the Grand Seal of State to be affixed at the Imperial Palace, Tokyo, this thirteenth day of the fifth month of the fourth year of Shōwa, corresponding to the 2,589th year from the accession to the throne of Emperor Jimmu."

== Insignia ==
The insignia of the order incorporates symbols for the three imperial treasures: the Yata Mirror, so sacred that not even the Emperor is allowed to look at it; the Yasakani Jewel, which is made of the finest jade; and the Emperor's personal sword.

The star for the Grand Cordon and Second Class is similar to the badge as described above, but effectively with two sets of Maltese crosses, one in gilt and one placed diagonally in silver. It is worn on the left chest by the Grand Cordon, on the right chest (without any other insignia) by the 2nd class.

The badge for the first through sixth classes is a Maltese cross, in gilt (1st–4th classes), gilt and silver (5th class) and silver (6th class), with white enameled rays (representing the sword). The central disc is blue, bearing an eight-pointed silver star (representing the mirror), surrounded by a wreath with red-enameled dots (representing the jewel). The badge is suspended on a ribbon, worn as a sash on the right shoulder by the Grand Cordon, as a necklet by males of the 2nd and 3rd classes, on the left chest (the ribbon folded into a triangle) by the 4th to 6th classes (with a rosette for the 4th class). For females of the 2nd to 6th classes, the ribbon is a bow worn on the left shoulder (with a rosette for the 4th class).

Until 2003, when it was abolished, the badge of the seventh and eighth classes was an eight-pointed silver medal, partially gilded for the 7th class, with representations of just the mirror and the jewel. The badge is suspended on a ribbon, worn by men on the left chest (the ribbon folded into a triangle). For women, the ribbon is a bow worn on the left shoulder.

Until 2003, the ribbon of the order was very pale blue with a gold stripe near the borders; since then the ribbon has been light blue, but retains the gold stripe near the borders. When the ribbon is worn alone, the ribbon for the Fourth Class and above incorporates a blue-and-gold rosette (very pale blue until 2003), with a solid gold bar for the Grand Cordon, a gold and silver bar for the Second Class, a solid silver bar for the Third Class and only the rosette for the Fourth Class. The ribbon for the Fifth and Sixth Classes has a centered blue disc (very pale blue until 2003) with gold rays radiating from its center, eight rays for the Fifth Class and six rays for the Sixth Class. Formerly, the ribbon for the Seventh and Eighth Classes had a centered very pale blue disc with gold rays radiating from its center, four rays for the Seventh Class and three rays for the Eighth Class.

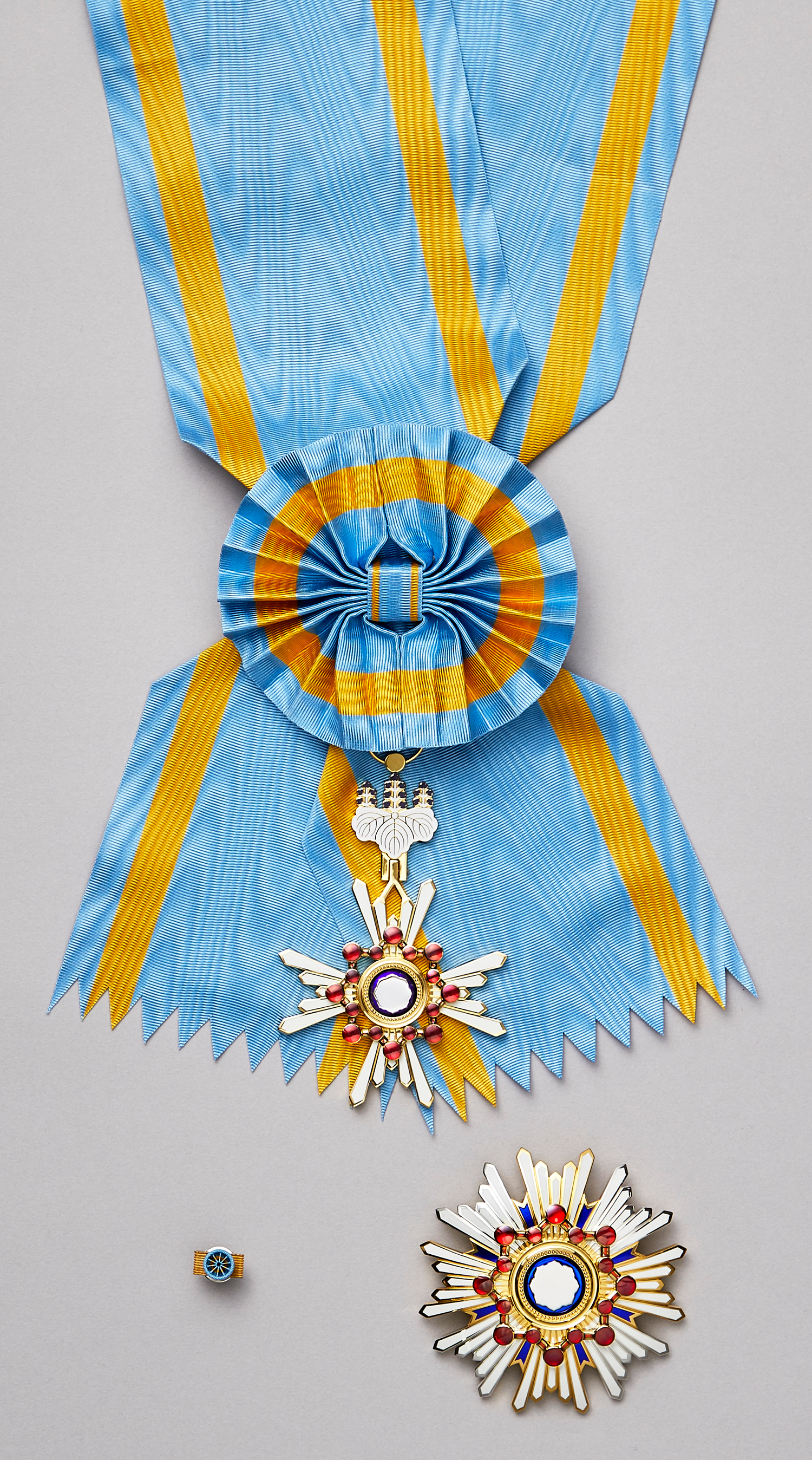
Grand Cordon of the Order of the Sacred Treasure (1st class)

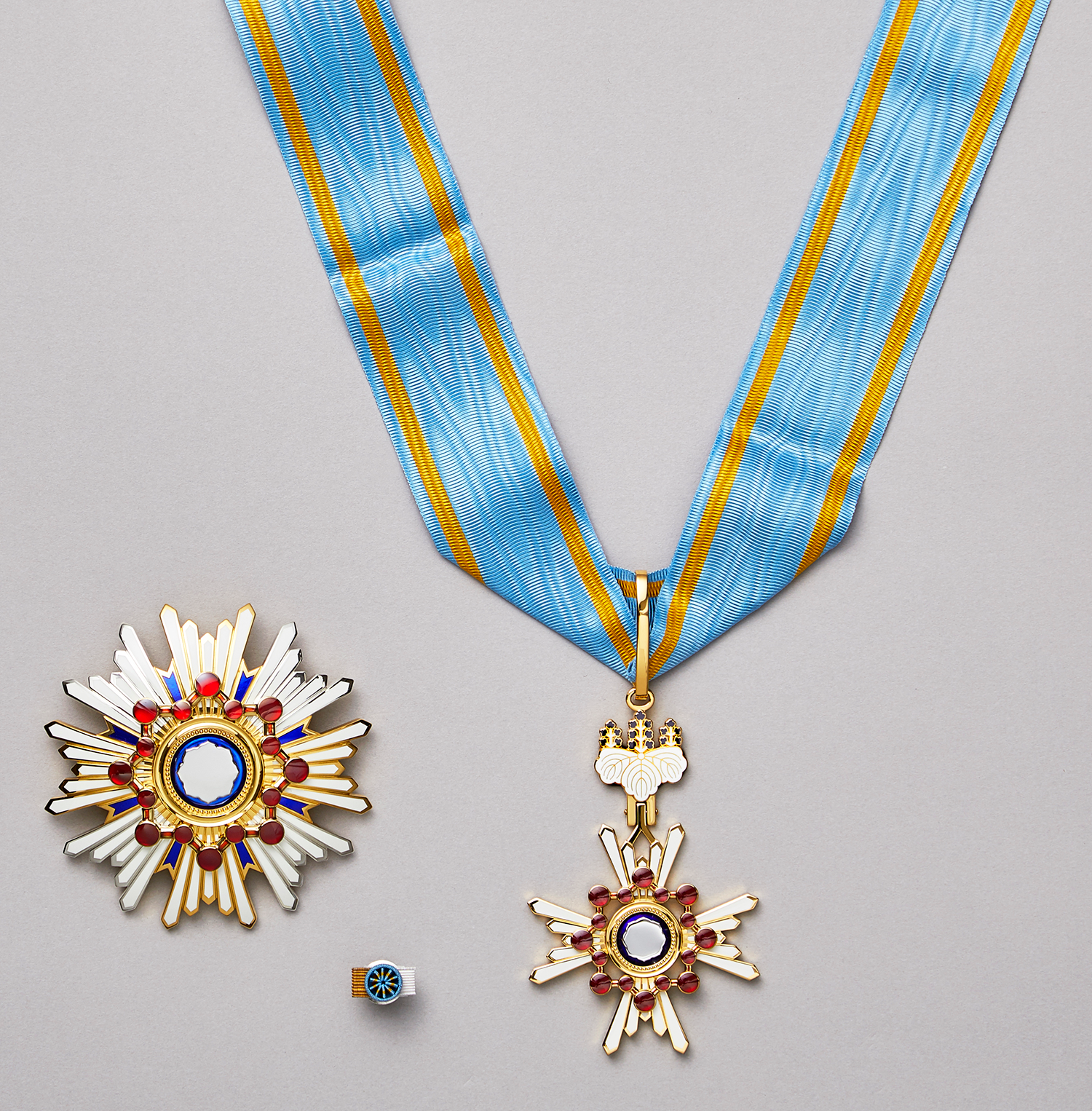
The Order of the Sacred Treasure, Gold and Silver Star (2nd class)

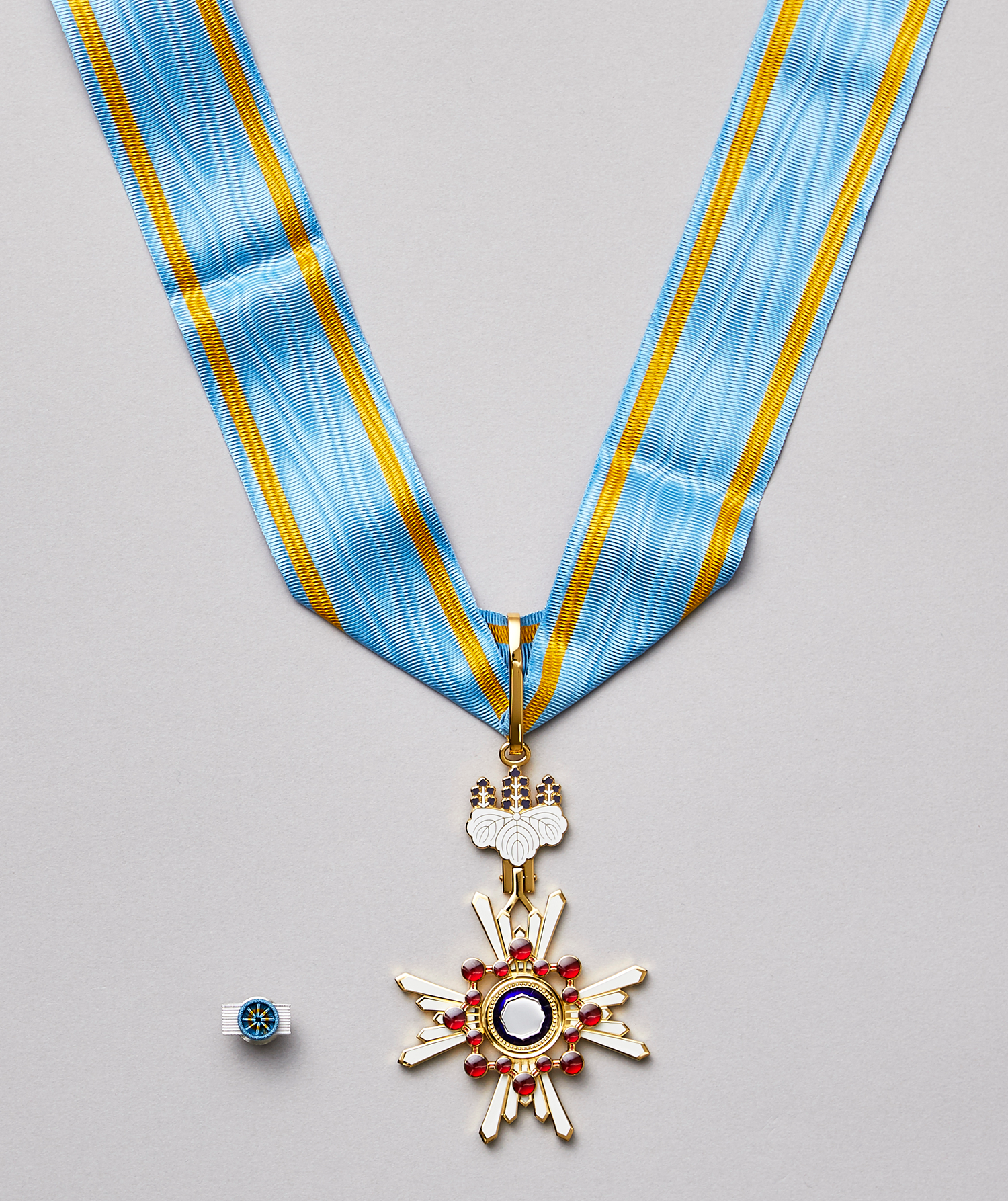
The Order of the Sacred Treasure, Gold Rays with Neck Ribbon (3rd class)

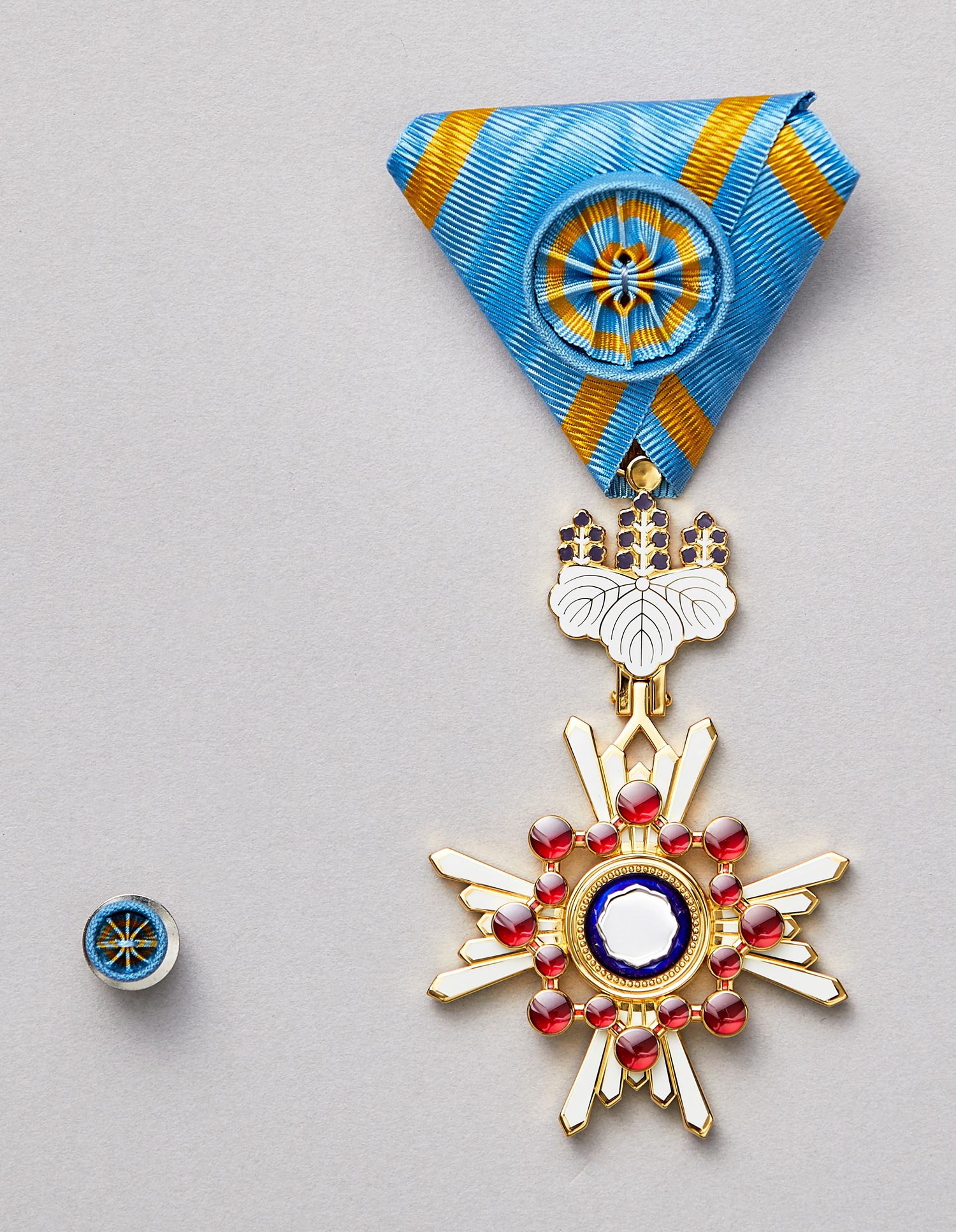
The Order of the Sacred Treasure, Gold Rays with Rosette (4th class)

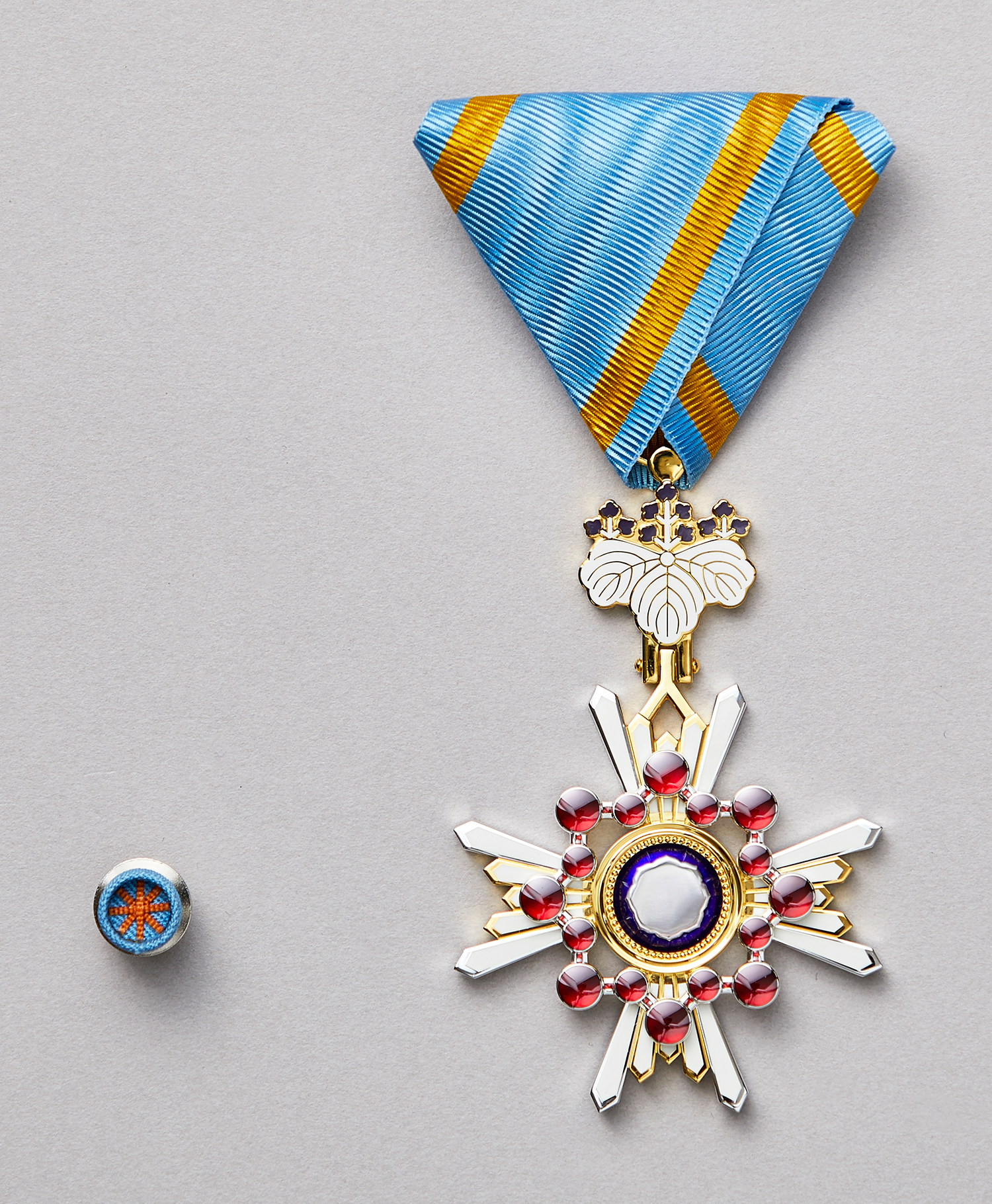
The Order of the Sacred Treasure, Gold and Silver Rays (5th class)

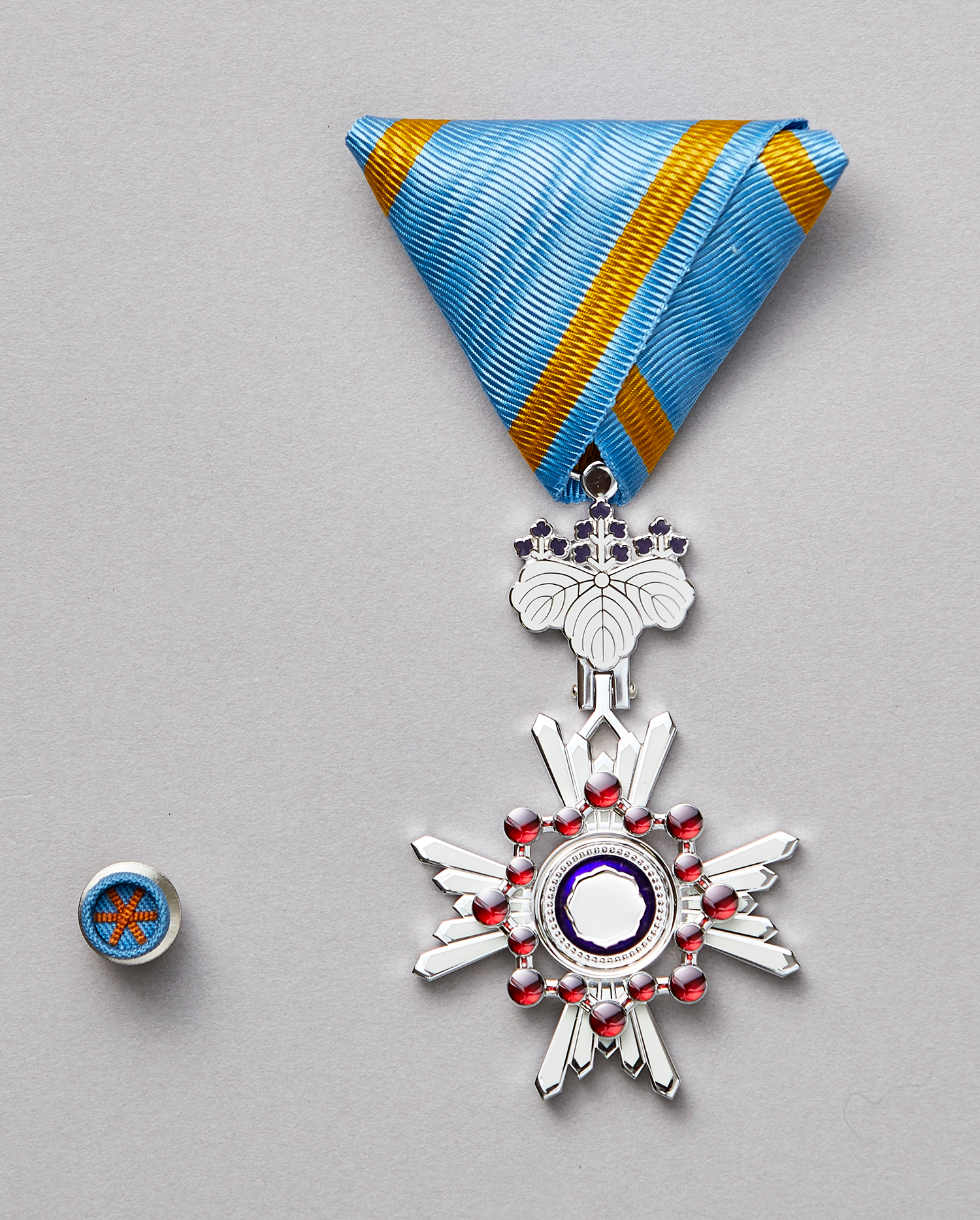
The Order of the Sacred Treasure, Silver Rays (6th class)

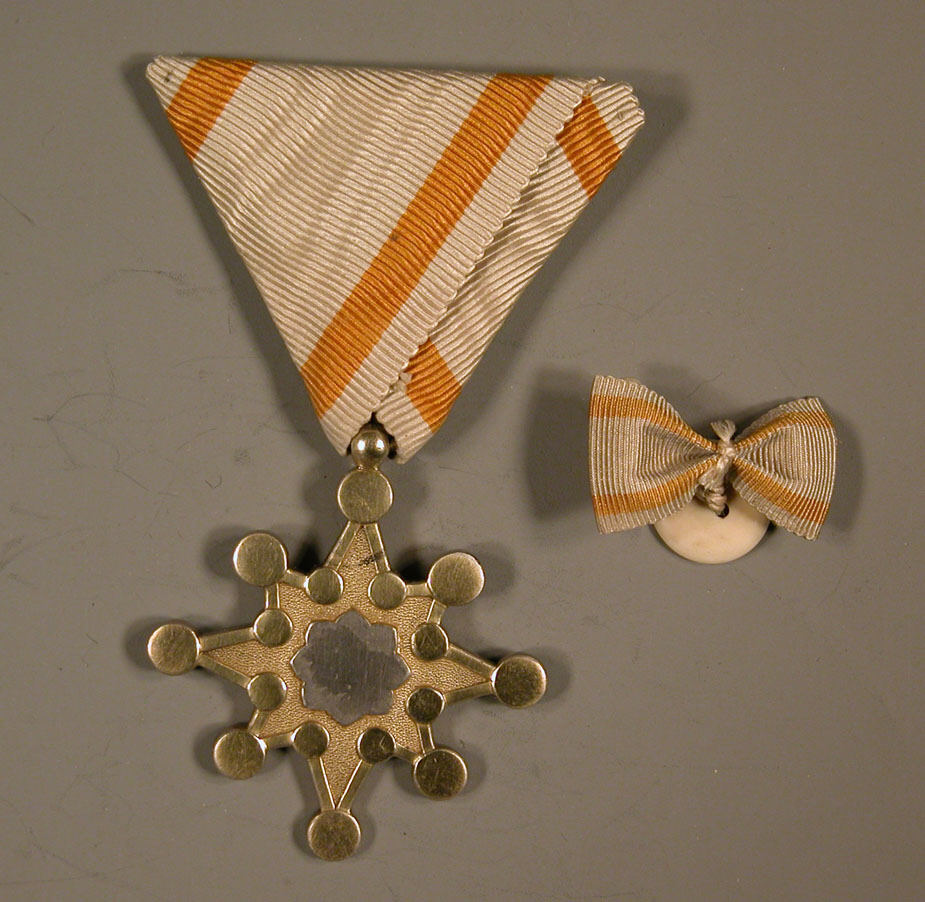
7th Class (Abolished in 2003)

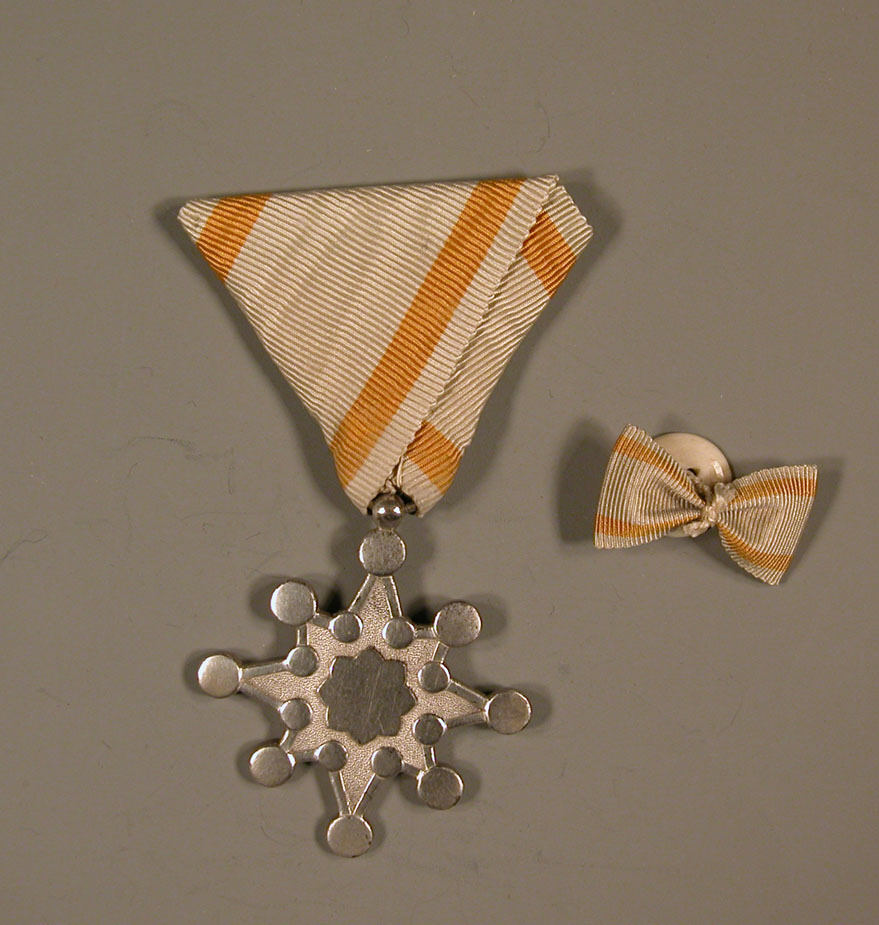
8th Class (Abolished in 2003)

Ribbons of the Order of the Sacred Treasure
1888–2003
| First Class |
| Second Class |
| Third Class |
| Fourth Class |
| Fifth Class |
| Sixth Class |
| Seventh Class |
| Eighth Class |
| General ribbon of the order |
2003–present
| Grand Cordon |
| Gold and Silver Star |
| Gold Rays with Neck Ribbon |
| Gold Rays with Rosette |
| Gold and Silver Rays |
| Silver Rays |
| General ribbon of the order |

== After the 2003 reform ==
In 2003 the lowest two classes of the Order were abolished. Moreover, the badges of the Order will from now on be suspended from three white-enamelled paulownia leaves.

== Selected recipients ==
=== 1st class, Grand Cordon ===
- Radit Punya TG
- Lt Gen Sir Edward Altham Altham, awarded 1918
- Sir Charles Alexander Anderson, awarded 1921
- James Burrill Angell, awarded 1909
- Isoroku Yamamoto, awarded 1939
- Lt Gen Alamsyah Ratu Perwiranegara, awarded 1988
- Abdullah Ahmad Badawi, awarded 1981
- Emilio Álvarez Montalván, awarded 2002
- Gen Mohammad Jusuf, awarded 1996
- Daniel Boorstin, awarded 1986
- Avery Brundage awarded 1964
- Ali Wardhana, awarded 1988
- George Champion, awarded 1969
- Cho Tong-yun on 21 April 1905
- Sir Hugh Cortazzi, awarded 1995
- Radius Prawiro, awarded 1994
- General Sir John Stephen Cowans, awarded 1918
- Takuma Dan, awarded 1932
- Mohammad Sadli, awarded 1987
- Henry Willard Denison
- Milton Friedman, awarded 1986
- Admiral Albert Gleaves, awarded 1920
- Stephen Gomersall awarded 2015
- Mark Hatfield, awarded 2003
- Chushiro Hayashi, awarded 1994
- Daniel Hays, awarded 2000
- Lt Gen Sir David Henderson, 1918
- James McNaughton Hester, awarded 1981
- Masaru Ibuka (1908–1997) awarded 1978
- Lt Gen Sir Launcelot Edward Kiggell, 1918
- General Sir Cecil Frederick Nevil Macready, 1918
- Baron Matsuoka Yasutake, 1902
- Yosuke Matsuoka, 1935
- Umezawa Michiharu, awarded 1914
- Kōkichi Mikimoto, awarded 1954
- Charles C. Moore, president of the Panama-Pacific Exposition, awarded 1916
- Akio Morita, awarded 1991
- General Sir Archibald James Murray, 1918
- Lt Gen Sir James Wolfe Murray, 1918
- Nakamura Utaemon VI, awarded 1996
- Norio Ohga, awarded 2001
- Henry Francis Oliver (1865–1965), awarded 1917
- Radhabinod Pal, awarded 1966
- Peter Parker, awarded 1991
- Samuel Kamuela Parker (1853–1920), awarded 1892
- Nancy Pelosi awarded 2015
- Sir Julian Ridsdale (1915–2004), awarded 1967 and 1990
- Edmund Leopold de Rothschild, awarded 1973
- Eishiro Saito, awarded 1982
- Saisho Atsushi, awarded 1903
- General Sir Henry Crichton Sclater, 1918
- Princess Soamsawali of Thailand
- Shinji Sogo, 'Father of the Bullet Train', awarded 1965
- Kiyoshi Sumiya, awarded 1998
- Shoichiro Toyoda, awarded 1995
- Hugh Trenchard, awarded 1921
- Prof. Pieter van Vollenhoven
- Maj. Gen. Aung San, awarded August 1943

=== 2nd class, Gold and Silver Star ===
- Hirotugu Akaike, awarded 2006
- Momofuku Ando (1910–2007), awarded in 1982
- Herbert W. Armstrong (1892–1986)
- Hans Hermann Baerwald, awarded 1989
- Thomas Baty (1869–1954), awarded 1936
- James Molesworth Blair awarded 1921
- Mary Griggs Burke (1916–2012), awarded 1987
- Pierre Cardin (1922–2020)
- Verner W Clapp (1901-1972), awarded 1968
- Samuel Mills Damon (1845–1924), awarded 1892
- W. Edwards Deming (1900–1993), awarded 1960
- Tomio Fukuoka (2008)
- James Harold Elmsley (1859–1921)
- Bonner Fellers, awarded 1971
- Ted Fujita (1920–1998)
- Fr. Hermann Heuvers S.J., awarded 1969
- Yoshimasa Hirata (1915–2000), awarded 1987
- William G. Irwin (1843–1914), awarded 1892
- Kaoru Ishikawa (1915–1989)
- Joseph M. Juran (1904–2008) awarded 1981
- Yuet Keung Kan (1913–2012), awarded 1983
- Masaki Kashiwara (born 1947), awarded 2020.
- Shahin Lauritzen, awarded 1999
- Bernard Leach (1887–1979), awarded 1966
- Mike Masaoka 1983
- Thomas Corwin Mendenhall, awarded in 1911
- Kakichi Mitsukuri, awarded in 1906
- Nahoko Takada
- Hideyo Motoyama (1925–2005) awarded in 2000
- Edward S. Morse (1838–1925), awarded in 1922
- Paul Neumann (Attorney General) (1839–1901), awarded 1892
- Richard W. Pound, awarded 1998
- Johannis de Rijke, awarded 1903
- Sakıp Sabancı (1933–2004), awarded 1992
- Jacob Schiff (1847–1920), awarded 1905
- Charles Nichols Spencer (1837–1893), awarded 1892
- Henry W. Taft (1859–1945)
- Ichimatsu Tanaka (1895–1983)
- Akira Toriyama (1898–1994), awarded 1971
- Wilfred Chomatsu Tsukiyama (1897–1966), awarded in 1963.
- Guy Tripp (1865–1927), awarded 1924
- John Alexander Low Waddell (1854–1938), awarded 1922
- John Smith Walker (1826–1893), awarded 1892
- Langdon Warner (1881–1955), awarded 1955
- William Austin Whiting (1855–1908), awarded 1892
- Merriman Colbert Harris (1846–1921), awarded 1916
- Hermann Adam Widemann (1822–1899), awarded 1892
- Eugene P. Wilkinson

=== 3rd class, Gold Rays with Neck Ribbon ===
- William DeWitt Alexander (1833–1913), awarded 1892
- John Batchelor D.D., OBE (1855–1944) Archdeacon of an Anglican Communion in Hokkaido awarded in 1933
- Khalid Jerjes, awarded 2017, Consulting Lawyer of the Embassy of Japan in Iraq
- The Rev. Stuart D. B. Picken (1942–2016), awarded 2007
- Frank Shozo Baba (1915–2008)
- Gheorghe Bagulescu (1886–1963)
- John Tamatoa Baker (1852–1921), awarded 1892
- Robert Hoapili Baker (c 1845/1847-1900), awarded 1892
- Thomas Baty (1869–1954), awarded 1920
- Henry Franz Bertelmann (1859–1921), awarded 1892
- Captain John P. Brockley USN (born 1942), awarded 1990 Commanding Officer NAF Atsugi
- Delmer Myers Brown (1909–2011), awarded 1997
- George Bull (1929–2001)
- Clark Burdick (1868–1948), awarded 1918
- Joseph Oliver Carter (1835–1909), awarded 1892
- Edoardo Chiossone (1833–98) 1891
- William Henry Cornwell (1843–1903), awarded 1892
- Dettmar Cramer (1925–2015), awarded September 1971
- Charles F. Creighton (1862–1907), awarded 1892
- Captain John Wallace Curtin Sr. USN (born 1944) awarded August 1994 Commanding Officer NAF Atsugi
- William B. Dazey(1915–2002), awarded 1961
- Sir Frank Gill (1866–1950) awarded 1930
- Robert Günther, awarded 1929
- Günther Gumprich
- Elmer L. Hann (1901-1990), awarded 1968
- Eleanor Hadley (1916–2007), awarded 1986
- John Adair Hassinger (1837–1902), awarded 1892
- Frank P Hastings, Major, USS Mohican, awarded 1892
- Captain Arthur Hawkins (USN)
- Col. William F. Hebert (1928–2008), awarded 1970
- Col. Vernon J Henderson (USAF) (1922–2008), awarded 1970
- Samuel Hill, 1922
- John Dominis Holt II (1861–1916), awarded 1892
- Frederick J. Horne, awarded 1919
- Akira Ifukube (1914–2006)
- Pieter Philippus Jansen (1902–1982), awarded 11 September 1964
- Paul P. Kanoa (1832–1895), awarded 1892
- Professor Iwane Kimura (1932–2019), Kyoto University, awarded 2012,
- Miles Wedderburn Lampson (1880–1964), awarded 1932
- Trevor Leggett (1914–2000)
- Masao Maruyama (1914–1996), awarded 1976
- Genzō Murakami, awarded 1981
- Toshiro Mifune, awarded 1993
- Tetsuya Noda, awarded 2015
- Isamu Noguchi (1904–1988), awarded 1988
- Thomas Noguchi, awarded 1999
- Samuel Nowlein (–1905), awarded 1892
- Keiko Ozato, awarded 2012
- Arthur Porter Peterson (1858–1895), awarded 1892
- Franklin Seaver Pratt (1829–1894), awarded 1892
- John Curtis Perry, awarded 1991.
- Captain Timothy Edwin Prendergast USN (born 1949) awarded August 1997 Commander Fleet Air, Western Pacific
- Leonard Pronko, awarded 1986
- John Keone Likikine Richardson (1853–1917), Private Attorney for Queen Liliuokalani, awarded 1892
- James William Robertson (1852–1919), awarded 1892
- Eric Gascoigne Robinson (1882–1965)
- Paul Rusch (1897–1979), awarded 1956
- Eiji Sasaki (1915–2007), awarded 29 April 1998
- Munetsugu Satomi (1904–1996), Graphic Designer, awarded December 1974
- William Schull, awarded 1992.
- Tadahiro Sekimoto (1926–2007)
- Captain Claude B Shaw USN (1918–2012), awarded May 1972 Commanding Officer Fleet Activities Sasebo
- Hiroko Sho, awarded 2006
- William James Smith (1839–1906), awarded 1892
- Sugino Yoshiko, awarded 1978
- Akira Suzuki, awarded 2005
- Col. Fred Grant Swafford (1924–1996), awarded 1972
- Osamu Tezuka (1928–1989), awarded 1989
- Herbert Cyril Thacker (1870–1953)
- Admiral Richmond K. Turner, USN, awarded after WWII
- Takeo Uesugi, awarded 2010
- Masanobu Tsuji (1902–1961), awarded 1942
- Bunei Tsunoda (1913–2008)
- Charles E. Tuttle (1915–1993), awarded 1983
- Elizabeth Gray Vining (1902–1999), awarded 1950
- Gordon Warner (1913–2010), awarded 2001
- The Rt Rev Herbert Welch (1862–1969), awarded 1928
- Charles Burnett Wilson (1850–1926), awarded 1892
- Arthur Young (1907–1979)
- Isamu Sando, MD (1928-2014), awarded 2007.
- Kayano Shigeru (1926-2006), awarded 2001

=== 4th class, Gold Rays with Rosette ===
- Sachio Ashida, awarded 1998
- Mildred Ruth Brown, awarded 1988
- Chōshin Chibana, awarded 1968 Archived 27 April 2010 at the Wayback Machine
- Charlotte Burgis DeForest (1879–1973), awarded 1950
- Verne Dallas Dusenbery (1885-1978), awarded 1968
- Ralph D. Dwyer, Jr., awarded 1973
- Keiko Fukuda, awarded 1990
- Masaru Funai, awarded 2001
- The Rev. Jean-Baptist Gaschy (1875–1955), awarded 1954
- John Gillett, awarded 1994
- Beate Sirota Gordon, awarded 1998
- Edbert Ansgar Hewett (1860–1915), awarded 1901
- Noriko Kamakura, awarded 2022
- Herbert Keppler, awarded 2002
- Helmut Laumer, awarded 2002
- Yukiko Maki (1902–1989), awarded 1976
- Thomas Masuda (1906–1986)
- Rofū Miki (1889–1964), awarded 1965
- Hidetaka Nishiyama, 2000, awarded 2000
- Akira Sakima (1918–2007), awarded 2000
- Agnes Mitsue Niyekawa (1924–2012), awarded 1998
- Junnosuke Ofusa (1908–1994), awarded 1982
- Richard Ponsonby-Fane (1878–1937), awarded 1921
- Oskar Ritter und Edler von Xylander
- Thomas Tozaburo Sashihara (1900–1974), awarded 15 December 1970
- Shozo Sato, awarded 2004
- Floyd Schmoe, awarded 1988
- Serizawa Keisuke (1895–1984)
- Ir Sukarno (1901–1970)
- Masao Takahashi, awarded 2002
- Wray Taylor (1853–1910), awarded 1892
- Andrew Tsubaki (1931–2009), awarded 2007
- Ichirō Tominaga (1925–2021), awarded 1998
- The Rev. Walter Weston, awarded 1937
- Ayako Hosomi, awarded 1981

=== 5th class, Gold and Silver Rays ===
- Janak Jeevantha Bandaranayake, awarded in 2020
- Alfred M Burke, awarded 2012
- On Chuil, member of the suite of the Korean Crown Prince, awarded 1908
- Hester Ferreira, awarded 1997
- Mabel Francis (1880–1975), awarded 1962
- Kumaji Furuya (1899–1977), awarded 1968
- George Edward Luckman Gauntlett (1868–1956)
- Capt. W.W. Greene, awarded before March 1908
- Seikan Higa, awarded 1968
- Friedrich Hirzebruch, awarded 1996
- Fujitaro Kubota (1879–1973), awarded 1973
- Thomas Masuda (1906–1986)
- John Mittwer (1907–1996), awarded 1977
- Chiura Obata (1885–1975), awarded 1965
- Azalia Emma Peet (1887–1973), awarded 1953
- Yi Pomik, member of the suite of the Korean Crown Prince, awarded 1908
- Miki Saito, Japanese Consul General to Hawaii, awarded bef Nov 1905
- Yoshio Senda, Hon. LL.D. (1922–2009), awarded 2008
- Chiune Sugihara (1900–1986), awarded 1944
- Yoshio Tamiya (1905–1988), awarded 1976
- Tetsuo Toyama, awarded 1968
- Tomio Fukuoka, awarded 2008
- Jungo Takita (1896–1957), awarded in Nasu on Aug. 14th 1957
- Yap Bee Hoon, awarded 2024
- Brian Francis Swords, awarded 2024
- Joseph Delgado Tenorio, awarded 2026

=== 6th class, Silver Rays ===
- Riichi Shibano, Certified on May 15, 1970
- Capt. Philip Going, approx 1905
- Eijiro Iwamura, 1975
- Chinyei Kinjo, 1968
- Chozaburo Kusumoto, 1906
- Mary Cornwall Legh (1857–1941), awarded 1939
- Capt. Mitsuo Matsumoto (Japanese: 松元三男), (1919-2004), officer of the Japanese Imperial Army, awarded 1944
- Hannah Riddell, (1855–1932) awarded 1924
- Ted Tsukiyama (1920–2019) awarded 2001
- His Majesty Ariki Tuheitia of New Zealand, awarded 2015
- Ko Wichun, member of the suite of the Korean Crown Prince, awarded 1908
- Joseph Seka (1893-1965) awarded 1919

=== 7th class: abolished ===
While established with the original induction of the first six classes, the 7th Class has never been issued or given an official designation or design. Officially the medal and its designation were abolished in 2003; there are no known recipients or issuances of this medal in its original design, since 1887.

=== 8th class: abolished ===
While established with the original induction of the first six classes, the 8th Class has never been issued or designated a design, like the 7th Class before it. Officially the medal and its designation were abolished in 2003; there are no known recipients or issuances of this medal in its original design since 1887.

=== General Class ===
- Jackson Bailey, awarded 1988
- Carmen Blacker (1924–2009)
- Faubion Bowers
- Ernesto Burzagli (1873–1944), awarded 1906
- Winfield Scott Chaplin (1847–1918), awarded 1882
- George Ramsay Cook, awarded 1994
- David Culver
- Dorothy DeLay
- Mamadou Diarra, awarded 1988 (Order with sunburst)
- Robert Lawrence Eichelberger
- Yoshikawa Eiji, awarded 1962
- Anton Geesink
- John Whitney Hall
- Heinrich Hertz
- Marcel Junod, awarded 1961
- Takahira Kogoro (1854–1926)
- Kume Kunitake, awarded 1889
- Tokubei Kuroda (1886–1987), awarded 1939
- Tetsuko Kuroyanagi, awarded 2003
- Toshirō Mifune, awarded 1993 (Order with gold ribbon)
- Lawrence Olson, awarded 1987
- Fusakichi Omori, awarded 1928
- Jean-Jacques Origas, awarded 1998
- John Roderick, awarded 1985
- Renato Ruggiero
- Jack Seward, awarded 1986
- Edmund Charles Wyldbore Smith (1877–1938)
- Kenjiro Takayanagi, awarded 1989
- Tomoyuki Tanaka, awarded 1981
- Eiji Tsuburaya, awarded 1970
- Yosh Uchida, awarded 1986.
- Morihei Ueshiba (1883–1969)
- J.R. Wasson (1855–1913), awarded 1874

== Gallery ==
Order of the Sacred Treasure

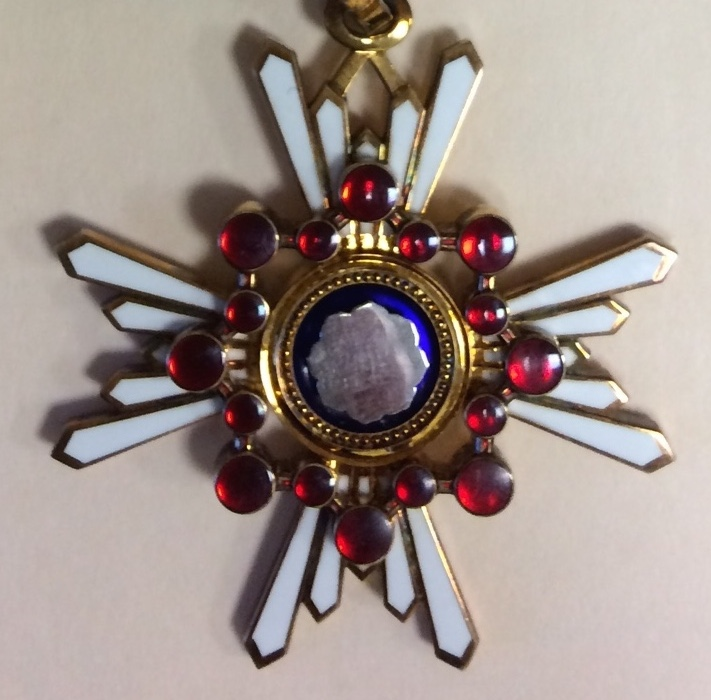
Order of the Sacred Treasure (class 3)

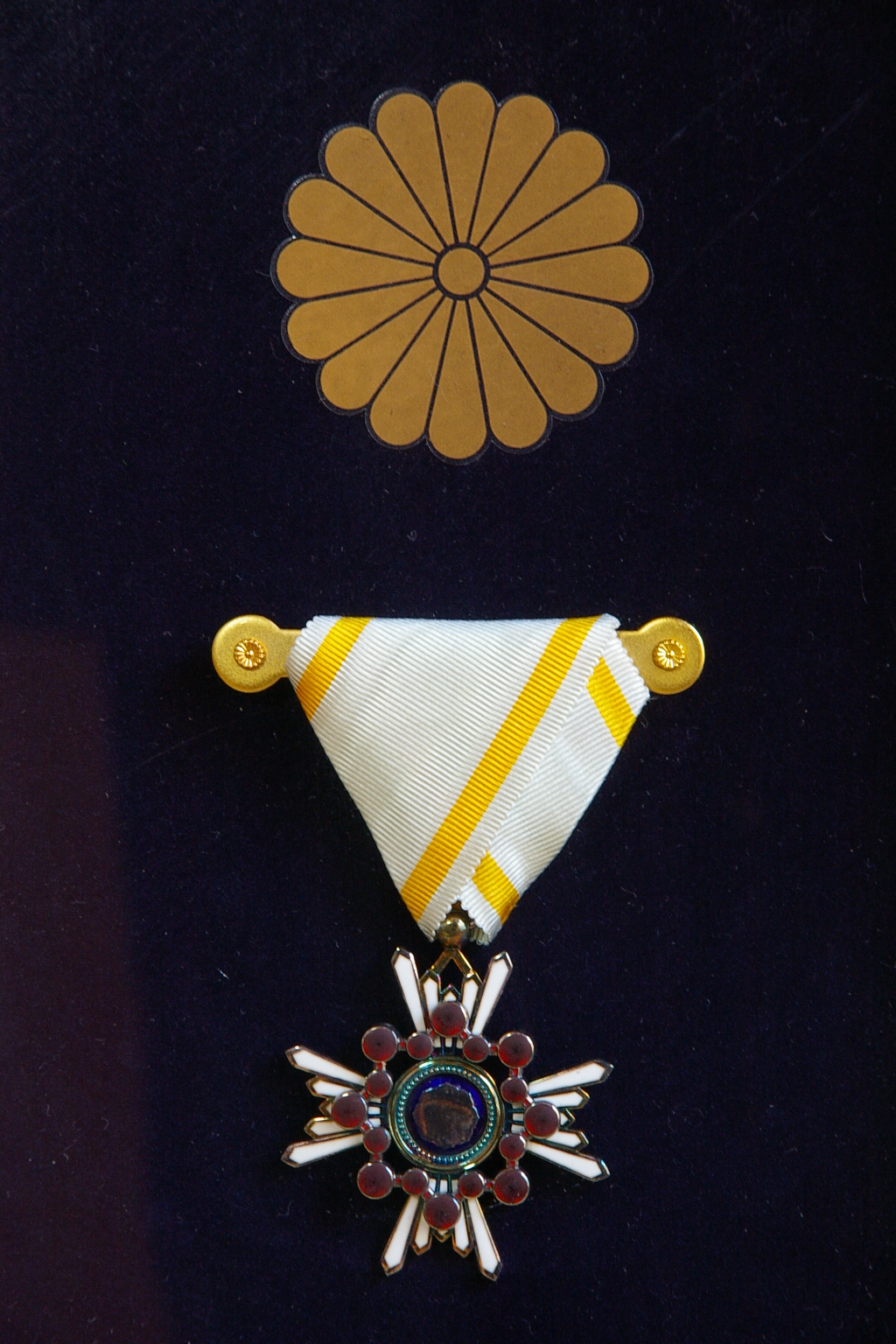
Order of the Sacred Treasure (class 5)

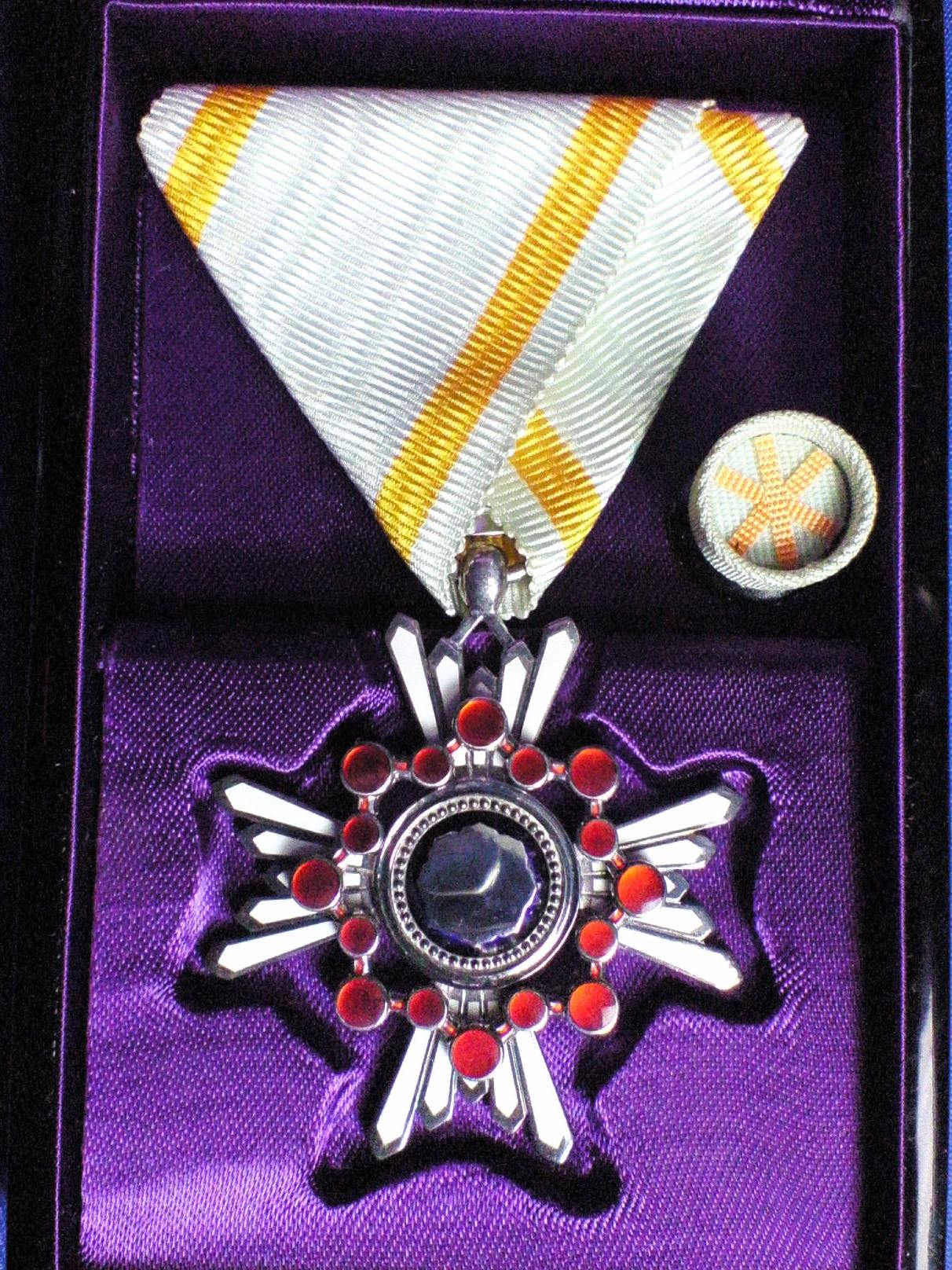
Order of the Sacred Treasure (class 6)

Ribbon of the Order of the Sacred Treasure – old type

== See also ==
- Order of the British Empire (UK)
- National Order of Merit (France)
- Order of Civil Merit (Spain)
- Order of the Star of Italy
- Order of Service Merit (ROK)
- Decoration of Honour for Services to the Republic of Austria (Grand Decoration in Silver with Sash, in Silver with Star, in Silver, Decoration of Honour in Silver, Decoration of Merit in Silver, Silver Medal)
- Order of Merit (Portugal)

== Sources ==
- Peterson, James W., Barry C. Weaver and Michael A. Quigley. (2001). Orders and Medals of Japan and Associated States. San Ramon, California: Orders and Medals Society of America. ISBN 1-890974-09-9
- Rossiter, Johnson, ed. (1904). The Twentieth Century Biographical Dictionary of Notable Americans, Vol. II. Boston: The Biographical Society....Click link for digitized, full text copy of this book
- Kenkyusha's New Japanese-English Dictionary, Kenkyusha Limited, Tokyo 1991, ISBN 4-7674-2015-6
