= Hawaii Federation of Japanese Labor =

Labor union for Hawaiian plantation workers

The Hawaii Federation of Japanese Labor was a labor union in Hawaii formed in 1921. In the early 1900s, Japanese migrants in Hawaii were the majority of plantation workers in the sugar cane field. These individuals faced low wages and long work days, as well as frequent discrimination. A day in the life of a laborer in Hawaii during this period was controlled almost entirely by the plantation owner; and in addition, many laborers were bound by contract to a 3-5 year period, and faced repercussions if this contract was deserted. Alongside the Japanese, there was a very high population of Filipino field workers who advocated for higher wages through the Filipino Labor Union of Hawaii. The Filipino Labor Union presented for higher wages and threatened a worker strike in 1919, and inspired founder Noboru Tsutsumi to organize the Federation of Japanese Labor in 1921.

== Background and history ==
In 1835, the plantation economy began in Hawaii, as Bostonian William Hooper arrived on the island of Kauai, establishing the first plantation throughout the islands. The Hawaiian Islands at this time were under the rule of King Kamehameha III. Traditional Hawaii land ownership practices were forever altered by the Gold Rush, the American Civil War, the Great Mahele, and the Reciprocity Treaty. Plantations throughout the Hawaii Islands were different than the continental United States and islands in the Caribbean in the fact that they paid their labourers, who were both male and female.

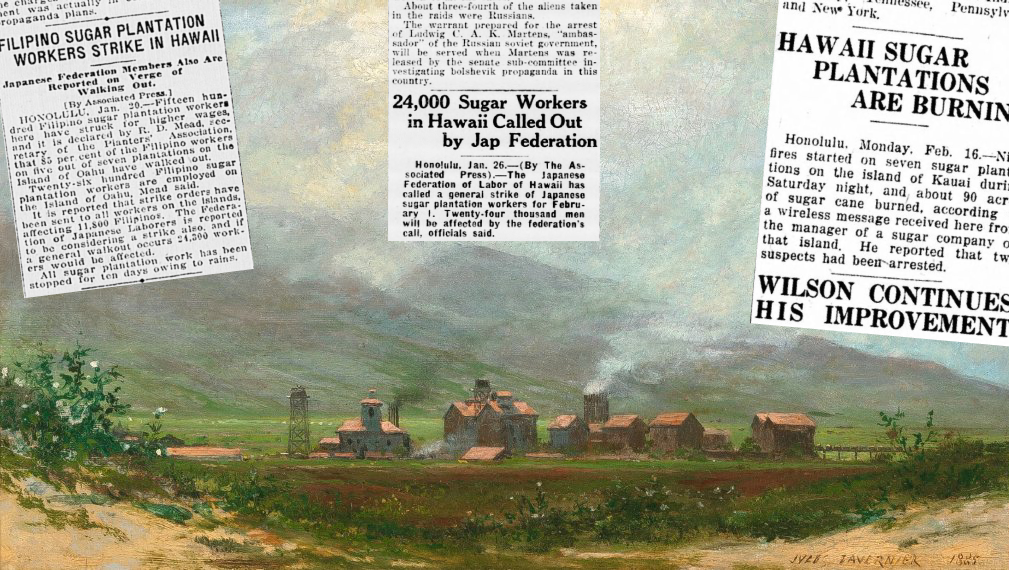
Filipino stance for fair wages and conditions influence the beginning of the Japanese Labor Federation

Before the 1919 and 1920 formation of the Federation of Japanese Labor, there were several strikes organized to protest the abuse endured by European plantation owners, notably the Oahu Sugar Strike of 1920. The plantation system of Hawaii was a physically taxing life for Japanese labourers, but by the early 1900s, they had established a community within the plantation system—leading to the ability and confidence to combat the harsh treatment they faced on the plantation, as well as the lack of adequate living conditions provided to them. This led to the formation of the labour union and the actions taken in 1919 and 1920 to oppose the laws and social norms of plantation life in Hawaii.

== Life in Hawaii and Influences of the Japanese Labor Movement ==
The urban centre of Hawaii, Oahu, was home to one-third of the entire Hawaiian Japanese population. In comparison to the Japanese population across the west coast of the United States, Hawaiian Japanese were not subject to the racist ideals of mainland American citizens. In Hawaii, the Japanese were the majority of the demographic makeup and therefore did not face the same level of isolation and fear of attacks based on race and ethnicity. This allowed the Japanese to plant roots and practice their traditions in Hawaii, their new place of residence. The streets of Honolulu were home to a bustling Japanese economy—and is considered by historians to be a "microcosm" of Japanese society—embodying Japanese customs and styles. The Federation of Japanese Labor, however, was opposed by the Plantation Labor Supporters’ Association, made up of many of the Japanese Elite. These groups considered "elite" consisted of business owners, school administration, religious leaders, journalists, and other individuals of various professions and associations.

Across the ocean in mainland United States, there were strikes in the mining industry in the Midwest that influenced the plantation strikes in Hawaii. These nationwide protests helped the movement in Hawaii to snowball and form a larger and more effective movement. In these demonstrations, some speakers detailed experiences on plantations, one of which was named Takeshi Haga, age 19, who described being "treated like livestock" while working. He was brought to Hawaii from Japan only a few years before these demonstrations. He further describes the supply and demand of products that are grown on the Hawaiian Islands and then sold and shipped to Japan because of the back-breaking work performed by exploited Hawaiian Japanese migrants.

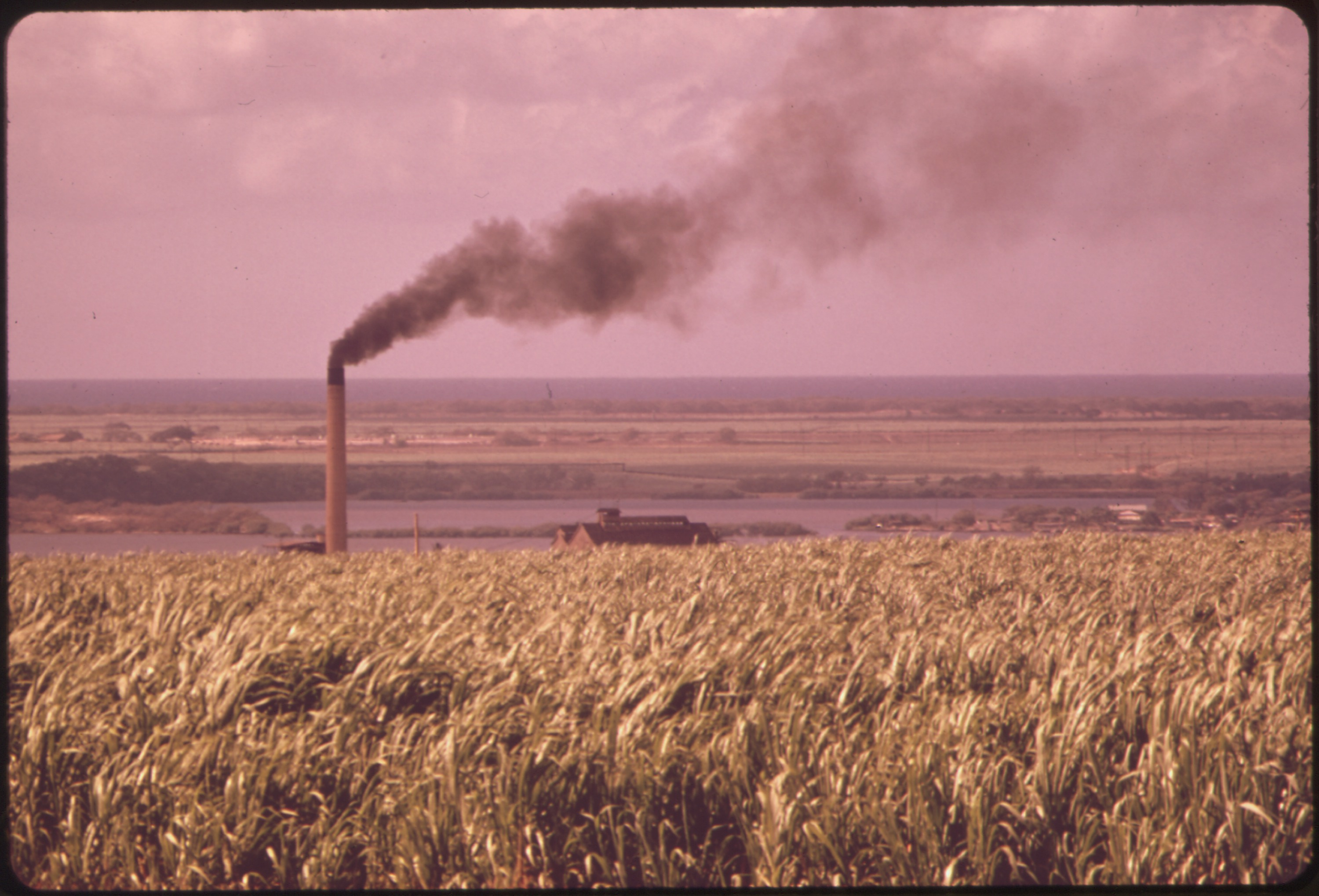
Waipahu Sugar Plantation of Takeshi Haga in 1919

Japanese culture versus American culture varied extensively based on the customs of mainland Japanese and the developed norms attained by the inhabitants of the Hawaiian Islands. This summarizes the universal clash between different cultures social norms.

== Protests and measures to evaluate labour demands ==
On a different note, the protests put on by the Federation of Japanese Labor were severe, and had to be addressed by the American Federation of Labor and their president in 1919, and was unsuccessful on the first attempt. As a result, this led to the intervention of the Attorney General at the time, Mitchell Palmer, who issued a strict warning if the workers’ strike were to continue November 7, 1919. Two days after this warning, on November 9, 1919, there was a lecture meeting in Honolulu to address the Federation of Japanese Labor and their workers’ strike. This meeting was held at the Asahi Theatre and was sponsored by the Plantation Labor Supporters’ Association. This was a platform for speakers like Takeshi Haga to share their stories and raise awareness for the treatment they faced as workers on the plantation.

On December 1, 1919, there was a meeting between Japanese labourers and the Honolulu Plantation Labor Supporters’ Association. Eight delegates from Hawaii, three from Hawaii, and five from Maui were in attendance alongside thirty representatives from the Honolulu Plantation Labor Supporters’ Association. Discussions were held regarding the number of delegates (representatives) from the islands of Hawaii, voting rights, worker wages, length of the work day, and creating social change. There were disputes between English and Japanese language press and journalism regarding the already tense circumstances. As a result of this meeting, delegates and voting rights between them were established: voting would be based on the number of laborers, and the islands each had a designated number of representatives. The island of Hawaii had eight votes, while the other islands were given six. This meeting was incredibly polarized that both sides of the party were concerned with a potential attack on the meeting in Honolulu.

Additionally, journalists and other press who were unhappy with the resolution between the Planters Association and the Federation of Japanese Labor challenged the background and knowledge of leader Noboru Tsutsumi; he had not worked as a laborer on the plantations. In terms of creating social change, at all of these events, it was customary to introduce and greet the press and bystanders who attended the demonstrations and sponsored meetings. This is an action that Tsutsumi did not perform; moreover, it was later discovered that he had been against the involvement of the Japanese press regarding the increase of workers’ wage increase. This was because he believed that the demonstration should be solely a labour movement with sole labourers as members, and was against the engagement of "peasants" who had travelled to Oahu to "dominate the movement" pushing labourers to the margins of the movement. Tsutsumi became the headlines in the press due to this publicized belief.

Following these events involving the Japanese Federation of Labor, the Hawaii Laborers’ Association was formed, and it was the island nation's first multiethnic labor union that included individual of Japanese, Chinese, Filipino, Spanish, and Portuguese descent.
