= Oahu sugar strike of 1920 =

Multiracial strike in Hawaii of two unions

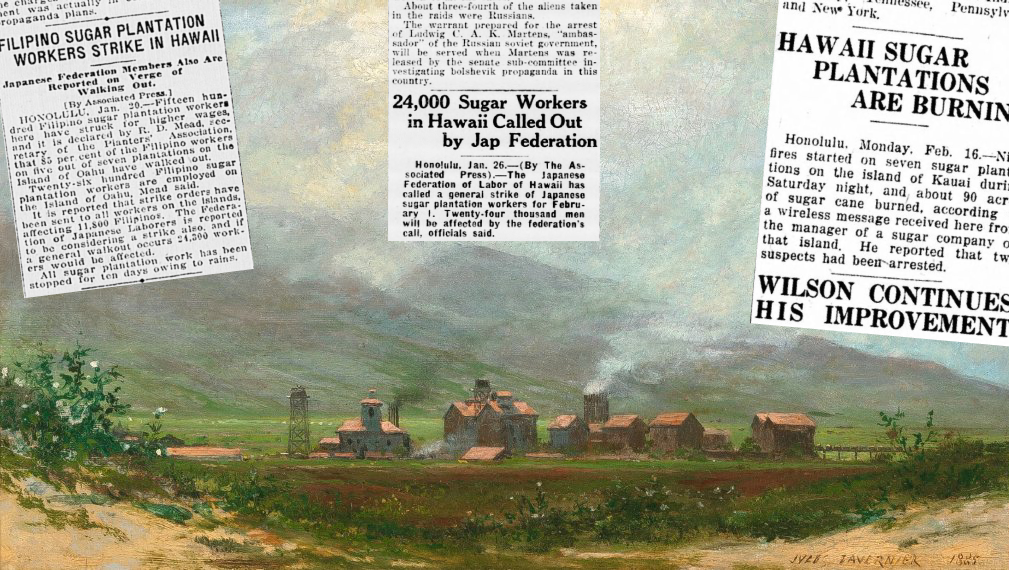
- Media coverage of the Oahu sugar strike of 1920 overlaid on the painting Maui Sugar Plantation by Jules Tavernier
- Date: 19 January – 1 July 1920

Parties
American Federation of Labor	Hawaiian Sugar Planters' Association

The Oahu sugar strike of 1920 was a multiracial strike in Hawaii of two unions, the Filipino American Filipino Labor Union and the Japanese American Federation of Japanese Labor. The labor action involved 8,300 sugar plantation field workers out on strike from January to July 1920.

The unions' demands for a pay increase were met by the Hawaiian Sugar Planters' Association. Some 150 evicted workers and their family members died of the epidemic Spanish flu during the strike, with their poor living conditions presumably contributing to their deaths.

== Background ==
Before the 1920 strike, when one ethnic group went on strike the other groups worked as strikebreakers, leading to a strike's failure. Before the strike fieldworkers were paid wages that met the poverty line. With the start of World War I, supplies directed to the war effort drove up living expenses and wages remained the same, putting much of the plantation work force into destitution, which lingered after the war ended. After years of organizing, the Filipino Labor Union and the Federation of Japanese Labor united the Filipino and Japanese groups. The unions brought their demands to the Hawaiian Sugar Planters' Association on December 4, 1919. The demands were pay raises from $0.77 to a $1.25 for males and $0.58 to $0.90 per day and paid maternal leave for females (With inflation $1 in 1920 is about $16 in 2025). Initially the planters refused demands and expected to outlast the strike.

== Strike ==
Roughly speaking the strike began for Filipinos on January 20, 1920, and the Japanese officially joined on February 1, although many Japanese joined independently earlier. The strike involved 8,300 workers spanning six plantations: 5,000 Japanese, 3,000 Filipinos, and 300 of other ethnicities – Portuguese, Chinese, Puerto Ricans, Spanish, Mexicans, and Koreans.

In retaliatory action against the strike the plantations evicted picketers and their families from plantation housing. A total of 12,020 people were evicted. The evicted took shelter in homes of strike sympathizers, hotels, tents, empty buildings and factories as well as Buddhists and Shinto churches, but Christian clergy had been prominent opponents of the strike and turned away homeless pickets and their families from lodging in Christian churches. The Board of Health re-evicted 300 Filipinos that had taken up residence in a brewery at Kakaako and they moved into tents.

Another dilemma was finances for food. The Japanese union's approach was to build up a reserve for the Japanese picketers and their families; this fund held $900,000. The Filipino union's approach was to be sustained by donations from Filipinos working on other plantations not affected by the strike. In less than a month, the Filipinos were desperately low on funding and on the verge of starvation. If the Filipinos were to return to work the strike would collapse. The Japanese union used their reserves to sustain the Filipino picketers, averting a collapse of the strike.

After months of striking immense boredom became a problem that had to be addressed. The Federation of the Japanese Labor arranged a protest march with 3,000 participants on April 3 and went down King street.

== Casualties ==
During the strike the Spanish flu hit Hawaii. 1,056 Japanese fell ill by the flu of whom 55 died. 1,440 Filipinos fell ill and 95 died during the worldwide epidemic. Picketers blamed the plantations for these casualties as the evictions had forced many of them to live in crowded living quarters.

== Conclusion ==
The strike lasted until July 1, more than half a year, when a compromise was reached at the Alexander Young Building which included a 50% pay raise and more benefits. Many workers felt the strike was a failure because the results were not immediate. It would take six months for the products of the strike to fully materialize.

The strike had taken a toll on both sides; 1,000 strikers had gone back to work and more than 2,000 strikebreakers were hired. The HSPA lost $12,000,000 in potential income. Although the strike was successful, the "Japanese Problem" and the "Filipino Problem" was exposed as a larger issue than the planters realized.
