= Hideyo Motoyama =

Japanese businessman (1925–2005)

- 本山 英世
- Born: August 27, 1925; Niigata Prefecture, Japan
- Died: November 22, 2005 (aged 80); Yokohama City, Japan
- Years active: 1950–1993
- Employer: Kirin Brewery Company
- Organization: National Soft Drink Association

Hideyo Motoyama (Japanese: 本山英世, romanized: Motoyama Hideyo; August 27, 1925 – November 22, 2005) was a Japanese businessman who served as president and chairman of the Kirin Brewery Company. He was additionally the representative director of the Beer Brewing Association and a chairman of the National Soft Drink Association. He was nicknamed 'the Emperor of Kirin' and was an awardee of the Order of the Sacred Treasure, Second Class.

== Early life ==
Motoyama was born in 1925 in the Niigata Prefecture and graduated in 1950 from the Tokyo University of Commerce. Out of school, he joined the Kirin Brewery as a salesman.

== Career ==
In 1984, more than three decades into work at the company, he became the president of Kirin Brewery. Under his leadership, the company launched the Kirin Ichiban Shibori draft beer, which became a hit seller and helped prevent a decline in the company's market share. By 1991, the company occupied 50% of the domestic market, and it was the largest brewery in Japan by that time. He also helped expand the company's pharmaceutical division and diversified the business further from its core products, including Espoo, their brand name for Erythropoietin. He reorganized the beverage division of the company under Kirin Beverage Company. 15 new products were launched during his tenure.

Motoyama resigned from the company in 1993, along with four other executives, after a scandal involving paying several racketeers a total of nearly ¥30,000,000 who threatened to disrupt the company's annual meeting. Even after resigning, he had total control over the company and continued to oversee it after stepping down as president, which earned him the moniker, 'Emperor of Kirin'.

== Personal life ==
For his contributions to the Japanese liquor industry, in 1999, Motoyama was offered the Order of the Sacred Treasure, Second Class. He initially declined the honor, but was offered it again in 2000, and accepted it then. For his development of Ichiban Shibori, he was also awarded that same year the New Words and Buzzwords Award.

On November 22, 2005, Motoyama died from pneumonia at a hospital in Yokohama City.
