= Tei Ninomiya =

Japanese educator

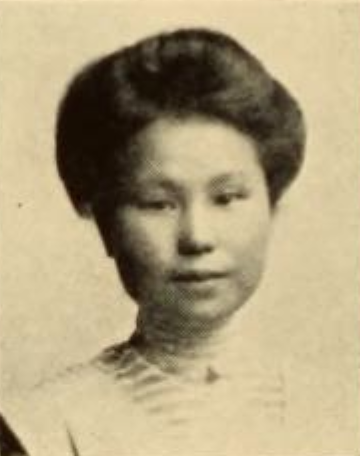
- Tei Ninomiya, from the 1910 yearbook of Smith College.
- Born: 1887; Matsuyama, Shikoku
- Died: Unknown
- Occupation: Educator
- Known for: first Asian student at Smith College
- Spouse: Unjiro Fujita

Tei Ninomiya (born 1887 – unknown date of death) was a Japanese educator and wife of bureaucrat Unjiro Fujita. She was the first Asian graduate of Smith College. A residence hall on campus, Ninomiya House, is now named for her. Another Japanese student Akuri (Aguri) Inokichi attended Smith in the 1890s as a graduate student and studied physical education.

== Early life and education ==
Ninomiya was born in Matsuyama, the daughter of Kunijiro Ninomiya, a Japanese Congregational minister and schoolmaster. She sailed from Yokohama to Seattle in 1903 with a group of other Japanese women students, and graduated from Smith College in 1910. She is recognized as the school's first Asian student. While she was at Smith, she spoke about Japanese women's lives, often dressed in a kimono, to women's groups and church audiences in New England. She wrote an essay, "The Condition of Japanese Women" (1907), for the Smith College Monthly.

== Career ==
Ninomiya was a teacher in Japan, and a Red Cross worker. She was also secretary of the YWCA in Yokohama in 1912, until she married in 1913 and was replaced by American Molly Baker. She was a member of the national committee of the YWCA in Japan, working with Michi Kawai, a Bryn Mawr College alumna.

== Personal life and legacy ==
In December 1913, Ninomiya married Japanese lawyer and bureaucrat Unjiro Fujita. They had multiple children: Meiko (born 1914) and Atsuo (born 1916); and they had two young sons when Smith alumna Stella Tuthill visited them in Kobe early in the 1920s. The Fujitas moved to Port Arthur in Manchuria later in 1922. She had a son and two daughters when she wrote to the Smith College alumnae from Hiroshima in 1930.

In 2010, the president of Smith College, Carol T. Christ, toured six Asian cities; the timing of her trip coincided with the centenary of Ninomiya's graduation from Smith. Smith College dedicated Ninomiya House in 2016, a campus residence named in her memory. There is a plaque on the building's exterior, explaining her significance in the school's history.
