= Hideyo Fujita =

Japanese actor

- Born: 1 July 1964 (age 61)
- Occupation: Actor
- Years active: 1994-present

Hideyo Fujita (藤田 秀世, Fujita Hideyo) (born July 1, 1964 in Tokyo) is a Japanese actor in film, television, and commercials. He is also an actor in the KERA theatre company (also known as Nylon100°C, Keralino Sandorovic).

== Stage history ==
- Gekidan Kenkou(劇団健康) 20 appearance from 1986 in total
- Nylon100°C(ナイロン100°C) 15 appearance stage.(data until October, 2010.)

== Television ==
- 24 no hitomi (TBS)
- Kinpachi-sensei (Sannen B-gumi Kinpachi-sensei part 2) (TBS)
- Narawareta Gakuen (drama, CX)
- Oishii Seikatsu (drama, CX)
- Aiko 16sai (TBS)
- Batten Robomaru (CX)
- Detarame Tenshi (CX)
- Yonimo kyouna monogatari (CX)
- Akai hanamichi (NTV)
- Triangle Lovers(NTV)
- Kinpachi-sensei (Sannen B-gumi Kinpachi-sensei part 7)guest (TBS)
- Shimokita Sundays (ANB)
- The Japanese The Japanese Don't Know(NNS)
- SPEC(TBS)
- Sakura shinju(THK)

== Film ==
- Ai no Shinsekai
- Nakayugi Hime

== Voice artist ==
- Batman(WOWOW)

== TV commercials ==
- DODA
- 0088 Nihon Telecom
- JACCS CARD
- Otsuka Pharmaceutical Co., Ltd.
- Benesse
- Glico

== Radio ==
- Radio Tosyokan(TBS)

== Radio Commercials ==
- Kirin Brewery Co., Ltd
- FamilyMart Co., Ltd
- Sapporo Breweries
- Shiseido Co., Ltd.
