= CFJS =

CFJS may refer to:

- Canadian Federation of Jewish Students
- Chicago Futabakai Japanese School
