= NikkeiWest =

San Jose, California newspaper

- Type: Bi-monthly Newspaper
- Format: Broadsheet
- Owner(s): June Oka Yasuhara and Denise Matsuzaki Hayashi
- Editor: June Yasuhara
- Founded: 1992 . In 2024 June Yasuhara and Denise Hayashi are the new owners
- Language: English
- Headquarters: San Jose, California
- Circulation: 2,000
- Website: nikkeiwest.org

The NikkeiWest is a bi-monthly newspaper based in San Jose, California serving the San Francisco Bay Area and Sacramento Valley areas. With the disestablishment in 2009 of two prominent Japanese American bilingual dailies, the Nichi Bei Times and the Hokubei Mainichi Newspaper, the Nikkei West remains the largest and oldest printed English newspaper serving Northern California's Japanese American community. The newspaper serves as a source of current events, news, sports and articles that are directly related to the Japanese American culture and heritage with articles of interests for the Nisei, Sansei and Yonsei generations. The NikkeiWest is the oldest all-English language publication for Japanese Americans in the Northern California region. In addition, this newspaper was the first Nikkei publication to have internet presence and provide e-commerce for its readers.

The NikkeiWest has a bimonthly circulation of 2,000 copies. The editor is June Yasuhara and Denise Hayashi. In 2024, with the new ownership NikkeiWest Foundation was formed as a non-profit 501(c)(3).

== History ==
The NikkeiWest was founded in 1992 to serve the English speaking Japanese American Community in San Jose. The paper serves over 90,000 English-speaking Northern California Japanese Americans.

In 2013, NikkeiWest featured the Confinement Sites Grant program awards on its front page.
