= Philadelphia Reparations Task Force =

The Philadelphia Reparations Task Force was created by the Philadelphia City Council in June, 2023. After meeting with the National Coalition of Blacks for Reparations in America, Councilmembers Jamie Gauthier, (D) and Kendra Brooks (WFP) introduced the legislation to develop the city's plan for reparations for slavery.

Among others, those speaking in support of the Task Force's creation were a Rabbi, Rob Buscher from the Japanese American Citizens League, and White Men for Racial Justice.

== See also ==
- Evanston Reparations Committee
- California Reparations Task Force
- St. Louis Reparations Commission
