= Democratic Sentinel =

Democratic Sentinel is the name of several newspapers, including:

- Cadiz Sentinel, Cadiz, Ohio, previously known as Democratic Sentinel
- Democratic Sentinel (Bloomsburg, Pennsylvania), Bloomsburg, Pennsylvania
- Democratic Sentinel (Rome, New York), Rome, New York
- Democratic Sentinel, San Francisco, merged into Occidental and Vanguard
