= List of San Francisco newspapers =

Local interest media

- AsianWeek
- Bay Area Reporter
- California Farmer and Journal of Useful Sciences (1855–1880)
- California Star (1847–1848)
- California Star & Californian (1848)
- Chung Sai Yat Po
- Daily Evening Bulletin (1855–1895)
- Daily Evening News
- Daily Evening Picayune (1851–1854)
- Daily Pacific News (1849–1851)
- Elevator (1865–1898)
- Golden Gate Guardian (1941–1946)
- Greens Land Paper (1872)
- Hindustan Ghadar
- Hispano América (1914–1917)
- Hokubei Mainichi Newspaper
- Italia (1897–1919)
- J. The Jewish News of Northern California
- Leviathan
- Mirror of the Times
- Nichibei (Japanese American News, 1912–1932)
- Nichi Bei Times
- Occidental and Vanguard
- Organized Labor (1900–1988)
- Pacific Appeal (1862–1880)
- Pacific Rural Press (1871–1922)
- Resources of California (1875)
- San Francisco Bay Guardian
- San Francisco Call Bulletin
- San Francisco Call
- San Francisco Chronicle
- San Francisco Evening Bulletin
- San Francisco Examiner
- San Francisco Herald
- San Francisco Independent
- San Francisco Progress (1918–1988)
- SF Weekly
- Shinsekai asahi shinbun (New World Sun, 1932–1941)
- Shin sekai (New World, 1912–1932)
- Sinhan Minbo
- South San Francisco enterprise (1907–1938)
- Star Presidian (1952–1972)
- Sun-Reporter
- Sunday Times, James P. Casey (1827-1856), publisher
- Synapse (University of California, San Francisco's student newspaper, 1957–2013)
- The Daily Alta California
- The Daily News
- The Pacific Ensign
- Vestkusten
- Weekly Alta California (1849)
- Wide West (newspaper) (1854–1858)
