= Edison Uno =

American civil rights activist (1929–1976)

- Born: Edison Tomimaro Uno; 1929; Los Angeles, California, U.S.
- Died: December 24, 1976 (aged 46–47); University of California Hospital
- Education: California State University, Los Angeles; Los Angeles State College
- Occupation: Policy Changer or Community Activist
- Spouse: Rosalind Uno
- Children: 2 (including James Tom)

Edison Tomimaro Uno (Japanese: 宇野 富麿, 1929–1976) was a Japanese American civil rights advocate, best known for opposing laws used to implement the mass detention of Japanese Americans during World War II and for his role in the early stages of the movement for redress after the war. To many Japanese American activists, Uno was the father of the redress movement.

Uno was born in 1929 in Los Angeles, California. He was the son of George and Riki Uno. In 1942, Uno was interned with his parents and siblings at the Granada War Relocation Center in Colorado. Not long after, he was transferred to the Crystal City Internment Camp in Texas, where he remained for the duration of World War II.

Following the war, Uno graduated from Los Angeles State College with a degree in political science. Later, he married Rosalind Kido, daughter of wartime national JACL president Saburo Kido. He later became involved in academia, teaching at San Francisco State University (SFSU) and various civil rights issues. Uno was active in grand jury reform, as well as in such civil rights issues as the Wendy Yoshimura Defense Fund, Title II Repeal, Redress for Evacuation, and the Japanese American Citizens League (JACL), and worked on the Farewell to Manzanar television program. Uno died of a heart attack in 1976.

SFSU, where Uno helped create one of the country's first Ethnic Studies programs, established the Edison T. Uno Public Service Award in recognition of his impact on the school and the larger community.

== Early life ==
Uno was born in Los Angeles in 1929 into a family of 11. As a young man, he was forced from his home during the World War II after Executive Order 9066 was signed. Uno was incarcerated at the Granada War Relocation Center in Colorado, then subsequently transferred to the Crystal City internment camp. He stayed at the internment camp even after the war was over, and he was told that he was the last American citizen to be released, after 1,647 days in prison. After Uno returned to Los Angeles, he became the youngest chapter president of JACL in 1950.

Uno's father, George Kumemaro was a first generation immigrant who arrived in America at the age of 19. Like many of those who came to America seeking new freedoms and opportunities, Kumemaro often took various forms of employment as a means of subsisting his growing family. First working at a nursery, and later on railroad construction in Nevada, California, and Utah, Uno's father was unable to provide for the complete needs of his family.

== Wartime detention ==
In 1942, the economic concerns of Uno's family were compounded when Uno's father was apprehended by the FBI; with George Kumemaro being subsequently held in detention centers in North Dakota, New Mexico, and Texas.

At the age of 13, Uno was apprehended, and eventually taken to the Santa Anita Assembly center in the spring of 1942. Transferred to the Grenada Relocation center, and later to the Crystal City Internment Camp, Uno reunited with his father in the fall of 1942. Although four of Uno's brothers volunteered for military service, all returned from the war without injury.

While Uno's father was one of the last to leave the Crystal City Internment Camp in Texas, Uno himself was one of the last Nisei to be released. Having been held in internment camps for four and a half years, and having lost almost all personal possessions during the war, Uno's family was forced to start their lives anew in 1945–6. Although he eventually returned to Los Angeles, this period of imprisonment and relocation had a profound effect on his life that he would never forget. Quoted later from his introduction to Executive order 9066, he wrote that " Time has healed some of the old wounds, but the scars are not visible, they are there in the deep recesses of that psychological corner of our minds".

== Activism between 1960-1980 ==
Following his return to Los Angeles, Uno joined the JACL in 1948; becoming the youngest chapter president in the organization's history in 1950. However, he was forced to leave Hastings Law School where he attended, due to poor health. Suffering from a stroke at the age of 28, Uno was informed by doctors that he might not live to be 40. Not allowing these health conditions to inhibit his contributions to community and political involvement, Uno chose to dedicate his life as a "champion of social justice".

Advocating for racial equality, Uno organized workshops with the ACLU and gave speeches to the SFLC, CCMC, CCCJ, and the CPHJ.

Uno served on San Francisco Mayor Joseph Aliotio's Crime Commission and on the city's Grand Jury as a chairman of the reform committee.

Uno also taught ethnic studies at San Francisco State University in the 1960s.

== Japanese American Redress Movement ==
In 1988, Uno's campaign for redress gained popularity, twelve years after his death. The campaign hoped to both educate the public on the plight of the Japanese American people, and gain economic restitution for their mass internment.

== Awards and recognition ==
In 1972, Uno was the recipient of awards from the American Civil Liberties Union and the American Bar Association as recognition for his position as national co-chairman of the push to repeal Title 2 of the 1952 Internal Securities Act, which authorized retention camps.

== Personal life ==
Uno was married to Rosalind Uno and had two daughters. He died on December 24, 1976, after a stroke at the University of California Hospital.

== See also ==
- List of civil rights leaders
