= Saburo Kido =

Saburo Kido 城戸三郎
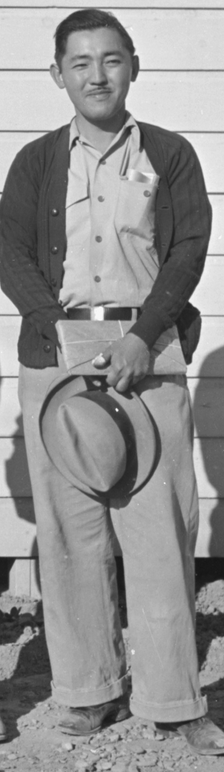
- Born: October 8, 1902; Hilo, Hawaii Territory, U.S.
- Died: April 4, 1977 (aged 74); San Francisco, California
- Education: University of California College of the Law, San Francisco
- Occupations: Attorney, newspaper editor

Saburo Kido (城戸三郎, Kido Saburo; October 8, 1902 – April 4, 1977) was a Japanese-American lobbyist, California attorney, and newspaper editor. He was also one of the founding members of the Japanese American Citizens League (JACL).

During the Pacific War, he served as president of the JACL, and navigated various difficult situations Japanese-Americans faced, including internment. After the war, he was involved in various lawsuits involving the civil rights of non-white and immigrant residents, including Nikkei, such as the Alien Land Law, school segregation, and fishing rights. He represented clients in the landmark cases of Oyama v. California and Takahashi v. Fish & Game Commission.

== Early life ==
Born in Hilo, Territory of Hawaii as the third son of Sannosuke and Haru Kido in 1902, Saburo moved to California at the age of 19 to attend UC Hastings (now the University of California College of the Law, San Francisco); he graduated in 1926. While in California, his parents left for Japan after the 18th Amendment outlawed the majority of alcohol production, which impacted Sannosuke's brewing of sake.

In 1929, Kido helped establish the Nikkei Shimin, later renamed to the Pacific Citizen.

== JACL ==
Kido was chosen as president of the Japanese American Citizens League in 1940. He pushed for the hiring of Mike Masaoka in 1941 due to his personality and connections to white political figures such as Senator Elbert D. Thomas.

After the Pearl Harbor attack on December 7, 1941, Kido wrote to President Franklin Delano Roosevelt; he assured Roosevelt that the JACL is prepared to fight against any Japanese military actions. Under his and Masaoka's direction, the JACL controversially cooperated with the internment of Japanese Americans. Kido and his family were themselves interned at the Poston War Relocation Center in Poston, Arizona.

== Civil rights attorney ==
During his time as an attorney, Kido fought for the civil rights of non-white Americans. He first collaborated with former ACLU attorney, A.L. Wirin, in challenging George Ochikubo's exclusion in 1944. In 1945, he represented Torao Takahashi on a suit against a California law that forbid "aliens ineligible for citizenship" from acquiring fishing licenses. The Supreme Court eventually overturned the law in their 1948 decision in Takahashi v. Fish & Game Commission. Kido was Fred Oyama's lawyer during the Oyama v. California case that enjoined enforcement of the California Alien Land Laws. He, Wirin, and Fred Okrand, also filed amicus briefs on behalf of the JACL challenging housing and school segregation.

== Later life ==
Kido later opened up his own law firm in Los Angeles in 1948. He still printed articles for the Pacific Citizen until he acquired ownership of the Shin Nichibei newspaper in the 1960s. Due to failing health, Kido retired in 1970. He died on April 4, 1977.
