= Karon Kehoe =

American author (1911 – 2011)

- Born: 19 September 1919; Detroit, Michigan
- Died: 9 March 2011 (aged 91)
- Education: Hunter College
- Occupation: Writer
- Partner: Monika Kehoe
- Writing career
- Notable work: City in the Sun (1946)

Karon Kehoe (19 September 1919–9 March 2011) was an American writer. She is best known for her 1946 novel City in the Sun, one of the earliest novels to describe the internment of Japanese Americans during World War II. She worked for the War Relocation Authority at the Gila River War Relocation Center, and utilized her experience of working there in writing the novel.

== Early life and career ==
Karon Kehoe was born on 19 September 1919, and was a native of Detroit, Michigan. Karon was in a same sex relationship with Monika Kehoe and changed her surname to Kehoe as she did not like her birth name. They declared themselves as half-sisters to avoid unwanted attention to their relationship. The couple lived in the San Pedro locality in Los Angeles. Karon was involved in organizing recreational activities for youth while Monika took evening classes for war workers and migrants.

In 1942, Karon and Monika moved to Gila River War Relocation Center to work for the War Relocation Authority. Gila River was one of the two camps located in the Gila River Indian Reservation in Arizona for the internment of Japanese Americans during World War II. Karon initially worked as the secretary to the chief of internal security and a telephone switchboard operator. In December 1943, she transferred to the Adult Education Department, which was headed by Monika since September 1943. Karen later stated that the racial tensions in California prompted them to moving to Gila River.

The couple wished to relocate from Arizona due to the extreme summer temperatures. In 1944, the couple moved to New York City after Monika got a teaching position at the Brooklyn College. They took along Kenneth Masaichi Shimizu, a Nisei teenager, after they agreed to sponsor him. While the trio lived in the same house for sometime, they separated later when Karon enrolled at Hunter College and Shimizu moved to upper Manhattan.

== As a writer ==
Following her departure from Gila River, Karon began writing a novel based on her observations of the camp life as a means of protest against the way the inmates were treated at the camp. She later stated that she had initially hoped that a Japanese American writer would publish such a work, but, when none appeared, she was "angered into writing" the novel herself. In early 1945, Kehoe submitted the manuscript for the Intercollegiate Literary Fellowship offered by Dodd, Mead and Company. When she received the fellowship, she took a year's leave from college to complete the novel.

The novel, titled City in the Sun, was published by the company in 1946. It follows the story of the fictional Matsuki family who were forcibly removed from their home and relocated to an incarceration camp similar to Gila River. The novel portrays the experiences of the incarcerated Japanese Americans, and the lives of the War Relocation Authority employees stationed at the camp.

The book received generally favourable reviews upon its publication. The Los Angeles Times praised the book as "thoughtful, sincere, and honest", while the The New York Times suggested the novel resulted from the author's "outraged sympathy". Japanese American reviewers such as Guyo Tajiri and Miné Okubo positively reviewed the book.

== Later life and legacy ==
City in the Sun was Karon's only published novel. During the 1950s, she worked as an editor for a women's magazine in New York, and in the 1970s she taught at a high school in Natick, Massachusetts. She died on 9 March 2011, and by the time of her death, her novel had largely fallen into obscurity.

== Bibliography ==
- City in the Sun (Dodd, Mead and Company, 1946)
