= Frank Chuman =

American attorney (1917–2022)

- Born: Frank Fujio Chuman; April 29, 1917; Montecito, California, U.S.
- Died: May 23, 2022 (aged 105); Bangkok, Thailand
- Education: University of California, Los Angeles, University of Toledo, University of Maryland
- Occupations: Attorney; author
- Spouse: Donna

Frank Fujio Chuman (Japanese: 中馬 不二男, April 29, 1917 – May 23, 2022) was an American civil rights attorney and author, involved in several important Japanese American civil rights cases and in the redress movement.

== Early life ==
Frank Fujio Chuman was born on April 29, 1917, in Montecito, California, to parents who had emigrated from Japan's Kagoshima Prefecture. The middle of three children, Chuman attended Los Angeles High School, where he graduated in 1934 as class valedictorian. He went on to graduate from UCLA in 1938, and then enrolled in USC's Law School in 1940. In 1942, following Executive Order 9066, Chuman was forced to leave school and was incarcerated at Manzanar with his parents and older sister.

While at Manzanar, Chuman served as chief administrator at the Manzanar Hospital. In 1943, Chuman was allowed to leave Manzanar and resume his legal education, first at the University of Toledo and then at the University of Maryland, where he was the institution's first Asian American law student. Chuman received his law degree in 1945. While at the University of Maryland, Chuman took a course in which he became acquainted with the writ of error coram nobis — a legal order that would play an important role later in his life.

== Legal career ==
In 1945, Chuman returned to Los Angeles, where he worked for a law firm which provided counsel to the Japanese American Citizens League (JACL). While working there, Chuman helped draft initial briefs for Oyama v. California and Takahashi v. Fish & Game Commission. In 1947, Chuman left the firm and joined the law firm of John Aiso in a partnership where he stayed until 1954.

In 1946, Chuman became president of the Los Angeles chapter of the JACL. He offered legal counsel for the national organization from 1953 to 1960, and was its national president from 1960 to 1962. While serving as JACL president, Chuman facilitated the launch of the Japanese American Research Project (JARP) and assisted with its fundraising. Chuman's work with JARP led to his research on the Japanese American legal history in the United States, including laws dealing with citizenship and immigration restrictions, alien land laws, and wartime confinement. Chuman published his finding in his 1976 book The Bamboo People. In this comprehensive book, Chuman delved into the varying reasons and motivations of the individuals, groups and organizations that were behind these laws.

In the 1960s, Chuman became involved in the civil rights movement and was named commissioner of the Los Angeles County Human Relations commission.

Chuman became active in Japanese American redress efforts starting in the 1970s, and with the effort to overturn court rulings for the World War II convictions of internment resisters Fred Korematsu, Gordon Hirabayashi, and Minoru Yasui. Years earlier, Chuman had discussed the idea of using the writ of coram nobis that he had learned as a law student to support this effort. Chuman repeated his suggestion of using the writ to help overturn the rulings during 1981 testimony before the Commission on Wartime Relocation and Internment of Civilians (CWRIC), and shortly thereafter the scholar Peter Irons and attorney Dale Minami undertook a coram nobis petition in this effort. Chuman joined the legal team as an adviser, and the petition led to the reversal by federal court judges of the two convictions.

== Later life and death ==
After 2000, Chuman moved to Thailand with his wife, Donna. He received a Distinguished Graduate Award from University of Maryland School of Law in 2005, and in 2011 he published his memoirs, Manzanar and Beyond. In 2021, at the age of 104, Chuman received an honorary degree from USC. Chuman died in Bangkok on May 23, 2022, at the age of 105.
