= Rafu Shimpo =

Japanese-English newspaper in Los Angeles

The Rafu Shimpo
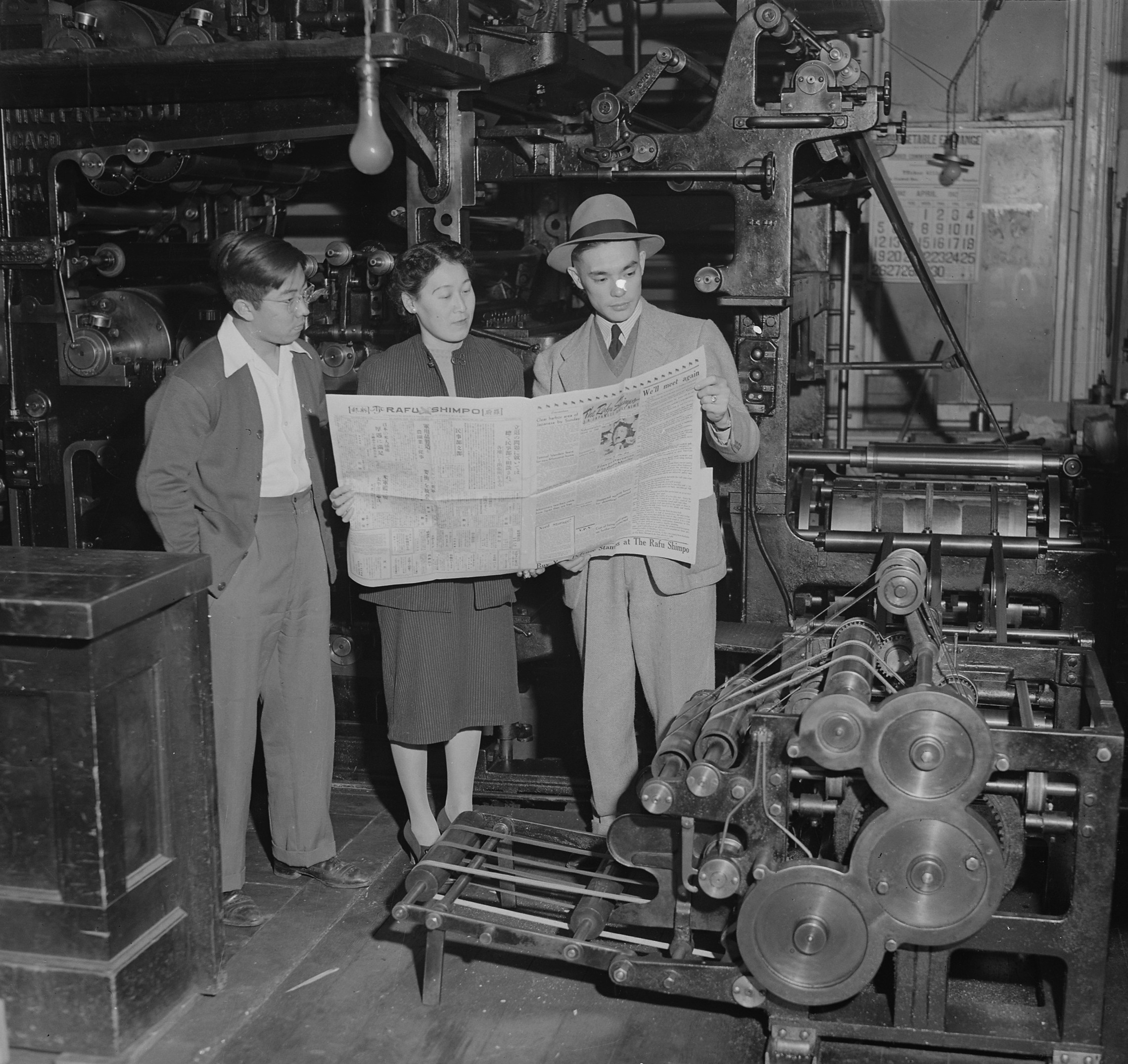
- Rafu Shimpo staff read the final edition of the paper before their incarceration in April 1942
- Type: Daily newspaper
- Format: Broadsheet
- Owner: Los Angeles News Publishing Co.
- Publisher: Michael M. Komai
- Editor: Michael Culross (English), James Yamamoto (English), Jun Nagata (Japanese)
- Founded: 1903; 123 years ago
- Language: Japanese / English
- Headquarters: 1300 W. Beverly Blvd. Montebello, California 90640; United States
- Website: rafu.com

The Rafu Shimpo (羅府新報, Rafu Shinpō) is a Japanese-English language newspaper based in Little Tokyo, Los Angeles, California and is the largest bilingual English-Japanese daily newspaper in the United States. As of November 2024, it is published online daily. In print publication is only on Friday.

== Founding ==
The paper began in 1903 as a one-page, mimeographed Japanese-language newspaper produced by Rippo Iijima, Masaharu Yamaguchi, and Seijiro Shibuya. H. T. Komai became publisher in 1922, beginning a family dynasty. He was succeeded by son Akira and grandson Michael. The name of the newspaper essentially translates as "Los Angeles area newspaper" ("ra" abbreviated from "rashogiri" (羅省枝利), a historic Chinese name for Los Angeles, "fu" meaning "prefecture", and "shinpo", a term for newspaper).

Weekly English sections first appeared on Feb 21, 1926. The English section became a daily feature on January 11, 1932.

== World War II and Japanese American incarceration ==
Togo Tanaka, the editor of the paper's English language section, appealed unsuccessfully to the United States government to allow the paper to continue printing in the event of war with Japan, and oversaw the paper's last edition before he was sent to the Manzanar internment camp.

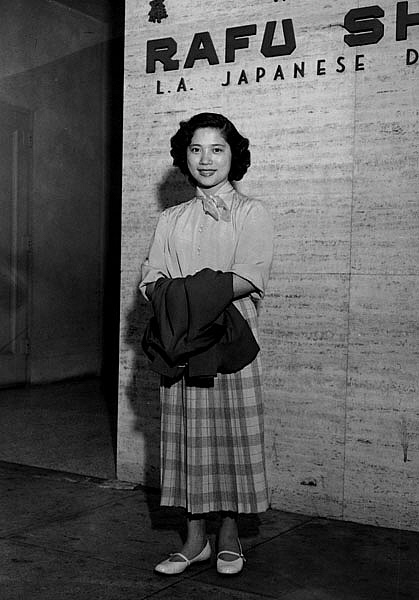
Chiemi Eri poses in front of the Rafu Shimpo office in Little Tokyo in 1953

The paper ceased publication in 1942 due to the incarceration of Japanese Americans at President Franklin D. Roosevelt's order. It was revived in 1946, due to Akira Komai's foresight and the loyalty of his employees. Komai had arranged for the paper's rent to be paid during the war and hid the Japanese type under the floorboards.

As of 1992, circulation was 23,000. By 1997, “the laborious process of hand setting the several thousand syllabic characters and ideograms used in Japanese, which took up to three hours per page, [had] given way to a rapid computerized operation.”

== Financial troubles ==
In March 2010, the Los Angeles Times reported that The Rafu Shimpo was losing circulation and money, and was the target of community drives hoping to save the newspaper from going out of business.

On March 25, 2016, publisher Michael Komai released an "open letter" stating that the paper had lost $750,000 over the prior three years, was projected to lose $350,000 in 2016, and would have to close at the end of that year unless its finances improved. In the hopes of generating 10,000 new subscribers and raising $500,000, Komai introduced an eNewspaper subscription drive in the same "open letter".

In 2025, Komai announced that the paper would move out of Little Tokyo due to rising rents and relocate to 1300 W. Beverly Blvd. in Montebello.

== See also ==
- History of the Japanese in Los Angeles
- International Bilingual School
- Asahi Gakuen
- Chicago Shimpo
- Hokubei Mainichi Newspaper
- Nichi Bei Times
- Pacific Citizen
