= Chicago Shimpo =

Japanese newspaper in Chicago

- Type: Twice weekly newspaper
- Founder: Ryoichi Fujii
- Editor-in-chief: Robert W. Karr, Jr.
- Founded: November 15, 1945
- Language: Japanese, English
- City: Arlington Heights, Illinois
- ISSN: 0009-370X
- OCLC number: 4032234
- Website: chicagoshimpo.com

The Chicago Shimpo (シカゴ新報, Shikago Shinpō; "Chicago News Report", ISSN 0009-370X), published by Chicago Shimpo, Inc. (シカゴ新報社, Shikago Shinpō-sha), is a Japanese-American newspaper published for readers in the Chicago, Illinois area. As of 1995 it was published twice weekly. It is currently headquartered in Arlington Heights, Illinois, and its offices were previously located in Albany Park, Chicago. The Chicago Shimpo, which publishes articles in Japanese and English, is the only Japanese-American newspaper in the Chicago media market.

== History ==
Ryoichi Fuji, who had been placed in an internment camp in World War II, created the Chicago Shimpo after his release. The newspaper was first published on November 15, 1945, and in 1947 the newspaper added English language pages. Kohachiro Sugimoto, who had joined the Chicago Shimpo in 1950 as the newspaper's business manager, became the newspaper's owner and publisher in 1966. In 1981 Fuji retired. Frank T. Sugano took over the publication; the Chicago Shimpo would have ceased publication if Sugano had not taken over the newspaper, because there was no designated successor to Fuji. In 1982 Sugimoto retired. In 1994 Frank Sugano died, and Akiko Sugano, his wife, took control of the newspaper. At that time Arthur Morimitsu was the newspaper's second in command.

By 1995, assimilation and a decrease in size of the ethnic Japanese community in Chicago reduced the community's demand for a Japanese-language newspaper, causing the Chicago Shimpo to struggle. The newspaper had trouble with finances during the decade leading into 1995. During the year of 1995, the newspaper circulation had stagnated at 5,000, and Sugano was unable to find a buyer for the newspaper. As of the same year, the largest group of readers of the Chicago Shimpo were located in Heiwa Terrace, a retirement home in the north side of Chicago that catered to Japanese Americans. Michael A. Lev of the Chicago Tribune said "Paradoxically, what has been good news for the Japanese-Americans the paper crusaded for has ultimately been bad news for the paper, which has written itself into near irrelevance."

Akiko Sugano decreased the newspaper's time lag in order to attract younger people, including Japanese citizens working at Chicago area firms. Issues previously discussed events that occurred months before publication, while after Sugano's fixes, the newspaper had a time lag of one week. In addition Akiko Sugano also added discussions of contemporary topics, including the internet.

== See also ==
- Japanese in Chicago
- Chicago Futabakai Japanese School
- Hokubei Mainichi Newspaper
- Nichi Bei Times
- Pacific Citizen
- Rafu Shimpo
