= Guyo Tajiri =

Japanese American journalist (1915–2007)

- Born: October 17, 1915
- Died: September 7, 2007 (aged 91)
- Alma mater: University of Missouri; San Jose State University; University of California, Berkeley; University of Colorado Boulder
- Occupation: Journalist, editor
- Employer: Pacific Citizen

Guyo Tajiri (October 17, 1915 – September 7, 2007) was a Japanese American journalist. She was the first Asian-American woman accepted to the University of Missouri School of Journalism. She also worked to transform the Pacific Citizen, a major Japanese American publication, as an editor.

== Early life and education ==
Tajiri was born on October 17, 1915, and her birth name was Tsuguyo Marion Okagaki. She had eight siblings. Her father was Kichitaro Okagaki and he reported for the Japanese newspaper Shin Sekai, which translates to New World Sun. During her teenage years, she worked as an unpaid assistant for the English-language section of her father's newspaper – Shin Sekai.

In 1932, she became the first Asian woman to be accepted and enrolled at the University of Missouri's prestigious School of Journalism. However, she would have to leave the University of Missouri after one semester. She went on to attend San Jose State University and later the University of California, Berkeley.

She married Larry Tajiri in April 1937.

Beginning in 1965, Tajiri started attending the University of Colorado, Boulder and was a member of Phi Beta Kappa. She graduated with a Bachelor of Arts in fine arts.

== Career ==
Beginning on March 29, 1942, Tajiri was in charge of the production of the Japanese American Citizens League (JACL) newspaper Pacific Citizen alongside her husband. Tajiri and her husband left the Pacific Citizen in 1952.

In 1952, Tajiri and her husband were honored by the JACL's Testimonial Banquet for their work at the Pacific Citizen. In September 1971, Tajiri was again honored at the 7th annual Tajiri Awards Banquet as the special guest of honor.

== Death ==
Tajiri died on September 7, 2007.
