= Murder of Evelyn Okubo =

1970 murder in the United States

- Photo of Evelyn Okubo
- Date: July 18, 1970
- Location: Chicago, Illinois, U.S.
- Convicted: Nobody

Evelyn Okubo was a Japanese-American sansei teenager killed during the 1970 convention of the Japanese American Citizens League (JACL) at the Palmer House hotel in Chicago, Illinois. Her 17-year-old roommate, Ranko Carol Yamada, was also severely wounded, yet survived. The murder caused a significant stir within the Japanese-American community, in part because Yamada alleged that the killer was African-American, just at the height of violence associated with the Black Panther Party. The killer was never found.

== Background ==
Evelyn Okubo was 18 years old and hailed from the Japanese community of Stockton, California. She and Ranko Carol Yamada had traveled to Chicago as representatives of the Japanese-American youth organization Yellow Seed to the national convention of the JACL, which was then focused on fighting for racial justice and against the Vietnam War. Prior to the murder, Okubo was believed to have attended racial issue discussion meetings with groups like the Black Panthers and the Young Lords, a Latino community organization with roots as a Chicago street gang.

== Murder ==
On July 17, 1970, Okubo was murdered, and Yamada was slashed in the throat, in Room 725 of Chicago's Palmer House hotel. Yamada, though badly wounded, wrote out several messages: "Gory, but it doesn't really hurt," "He was a black man with a natural," and "Don't blame him it was not his fault. There must be absolute peace." When the victims were discovered about half an hour later by a third JACL attendee sharing the hotel room, both girls had been stripped naked and bound, though neither showed evidence of being raped. Yamada could not speak for two weeks after the incident due to her throat injury, but eventually recounted that the attacker had pranced around naked before killing Okubo.

== Aftermath ==
Chicago newspapers originally ran sensational stories alleging that Okubo was raped prior to being murdered, and implied that interracial dating on the part of the youth activists was to blame. Meanwhile, two police officers were killed by sniper fire from a housing project that same day, while several police and Panthers had been killed the previous year, which added to the supposition that Okubo was killed by a Panther. According to the Chicago Tribune, police named a man named Lonell Robinson as a prime suspect in the murder after he was caught raping and robbing another woman in the same hotel. Robinson was not affiliated with the Black Panthers or any other political organization. However, Robinson was later ruled out as a suspect, though in the rape case he was indeed convicted the following year. Newspapers also eventually acknowledged that no rape had been committed in Okubo's case, and though some columnists suspected that racial animus was a motive, this has never been confirmed as the perpetrator was never found.

Carol Yamada and Mabel Okubo, Evelyn's mother, later filed a civil suit against the Palmer House hotel, alleging negligence.

== Legacy ==
The tragedy of Okubo's murder was the inspiration for Japanese-American songwriter and musician Nobuko JoAnne Miyamoto, another JACL attendee and West Side Story actress, to write her first song. She and fellow musician Chris Iijima began touring Japanese-American communities, advocating interracial reconciliation and activism while raising money to honor Okubo's memory. Ultimately, they would form the band Yellow Pearl (a pun on Yellow Peril) and become a touchstone in Asian-American media.

However, many older Japanese-Americans viewed the murder as confirming their suspicions about the dangers of interracial activism by young Japanese-Americans, and despite the fact that no evidence has been found to support the claim, the belief that the crime was committed by a Black Panther remains prevalent in parts of the community.

== See also ==
- List of homicides in Illinois
- Japanese in Chicago
- List of unsolved murders (1900–1979)
