= Japanese in Chicago =

Ethnic group in Chicago, Illinois, US

Among the Japanese in the Chicago metropolitan area, there are Japanese-American and Japanese expatriate populations. Early Japanese began arriving around the time of the World's Columbian Exposition of 1893. During World War II, Japanese-Americans opted to live in Chicago rather than be interned, primarily in camps on the Pacific Coast. In the 20th century, Japanese and Japanese Americans formed local institutions that continue into the 21st century.

== History ==
The first group of Japanese in Chicago arrived in 1892. They came as part of the Columbian Exposition so they could build the Ho-o-den Pavilion in Chicago. In 1893 the first known Japanese individual in Chicago, Kamenosuke Nishi, moved to Chicago from San Francisco. He opened a gift store, and Masako Osako, author of "Japanese Americans: Melting into the All-American Melting Pot," wrote that he was "said to have amassed $700,000 from the successful management" of his 27th Street and Cottage Grove location.

Some Japanese in Chicago operated businesses such as restaurants, gift shops, and housing units. Some Japanese came to study at universities in the Chicago area. In 1893 Eiji Asada completed a PhD at the University of Chicago.

The pre-World War II Japanese population mostly lived in the Hyde Park/Kenwood/Woodlawn region. Many of the Japanese were students of the University of Chicago or had graduated from that school. Irving Cutler, author of Chicago, Metropolis of the Mid-continent, wrote that in that period, compared to the West Coast, Chicago had little discrimination against the Japanese. In 1927 there were 300 Japanese Americans in Chicago. In 1940 there were 390 Japanese Americans in Chicago. Osako characterized the pre-World War II growth of the Japanese-American community as being slow.

=== World War II ===
During World War II, the first field office of the War Relocation Authority (WRA) opened in Chicago and the city invited Japanese leaving the Japanese internment camps. The first wave of Japanese Americans from the internment camps arrived on June 12, 1942. During the war, the number of ethnic Japanese increased to 20,000. Unlike on the west coast, the Japanese had freedom of movement and could work. Japanese worked in factories making materials to support the war, including aircraft and electronics. They were often placed in areas in between white and black neighborhoods, including Lake View, the Near North Side, Oakland, North Kenwood, and Woodlawn.

The Japanese Americans in Chicago largely relied on each other and avoided support from civic organizations, church organizations, and the WRA. Charlotte Brooks, author of "In the Twilight Zone between Black and White: Japanese American Resettlement and Community in Chicago, 1942-1945," wrote that Chicagoans did not perceive the Japanese-Americans as being "Japanese", but rather as non-White, and being "Orientals" but not black. She stated that Chicagoans, accustomed to living in a city with predominately Whites of a superior status and blacks with an inferior status, had difficulty classifying Japanese in their racial structure. She added that the discrimination against the Japanese mainly came because they were non-White, not because they were Japanese. Some anti-Japanese violence occurred, including the destruction of windows of a Japanese gift shop. During that period Chicago-area Chinese and Filipinos stressed that they were not Japanese. The Japanese of the era had a tendency to gravitate towards the White world and away from the black world, understanding that blacks in Chicago had an inferior status. Ultimately 30,000 Japanese had moved from the internment camps to Chicago.

=== Post-World War II ===
After World War II ended, many Japanese who had originated from the internment camps returned to the West Coast, so the Japanese population decreased. The influx of Japanese ended in 1950. Almost half of the Japanese who had settled in Chicago from the internment camps moved back to the West Coast. By 1960, there were about 15,000 Japanese in Chicago and the resettlement to the West Coast largely ceased.

In 1981, public hearings were held by the Commission on Wartime Relocation and Internment of Civilians at Chicago's Northeastern Illinois University as part of a government investigation into the constitutionality of the World War II internment of Japanese Americans. Nearly 100 people participated in the Chicago hearings.

A 1993 article called "Racial Change to the Suburbs" quoted Japanese Americans as being experts on the Asian Americans moving to the suburbs. Jacalyn D. Harden, author of Double Cross: Japanese Americans in Black and White Chicago, wrote that it was "seen by many" as "privileging" the "Japanese Americans over other Asian groups."

By 1995 Japanese Americans began moving to the suburbs. Most of them were white collar households who had higher incomes and better educations who wish to find superior schools for their offspring. As of 1995, about 25% of the Japanese American households are in the suburbs. As a result, Osako stated that the next generations of Nisei in the Chicago area will have less contact with the wider Japanese American community in the central city than before.

As of 2006 there is a high intermarriage rate among the Japanese, and there is a large amount of assimilation into the larger American community.

== Geography ==
As of the 2000 U.S. census, 5,500 people of Japanese descent lived in the city of Chicago, and 17,500 people of Japanese descent lived in Chicago suburbs such as Arlington Heights, Evanston, Hoffman Estates, Lincolnwood, and Skokie. Most Japanese within the City of Chicago live in lakefront areas in the North Side, including Edgewater, Lake View, Near North Side, Uptown, and West Ridge.

Jay Shimotake, the president of the Mid America Japanese Club (MAJC), an organization located in Arlington Heights now known as the Chicago Japanese Club (シカゴ日本人会 Shikago Nihonjin Kai), said "Arlington Heights is a very convenient location, and Japanese people in the business environment know it's a nice location surrounding O'Hare Airport."

There was previously a "Little Tokyo" near the intersection of Clark and Division. It has gradually diminished since Sandburg Village was developed. The mystery novel Clark and Division by Naomi Hirahara, which focuses on a Japanese-American family during World War II, is set in that area.

== Nationals ==
As of 2006 several thousand Japanese nationals working as representatives of companies live in the Chicago area.

== Institutions ==
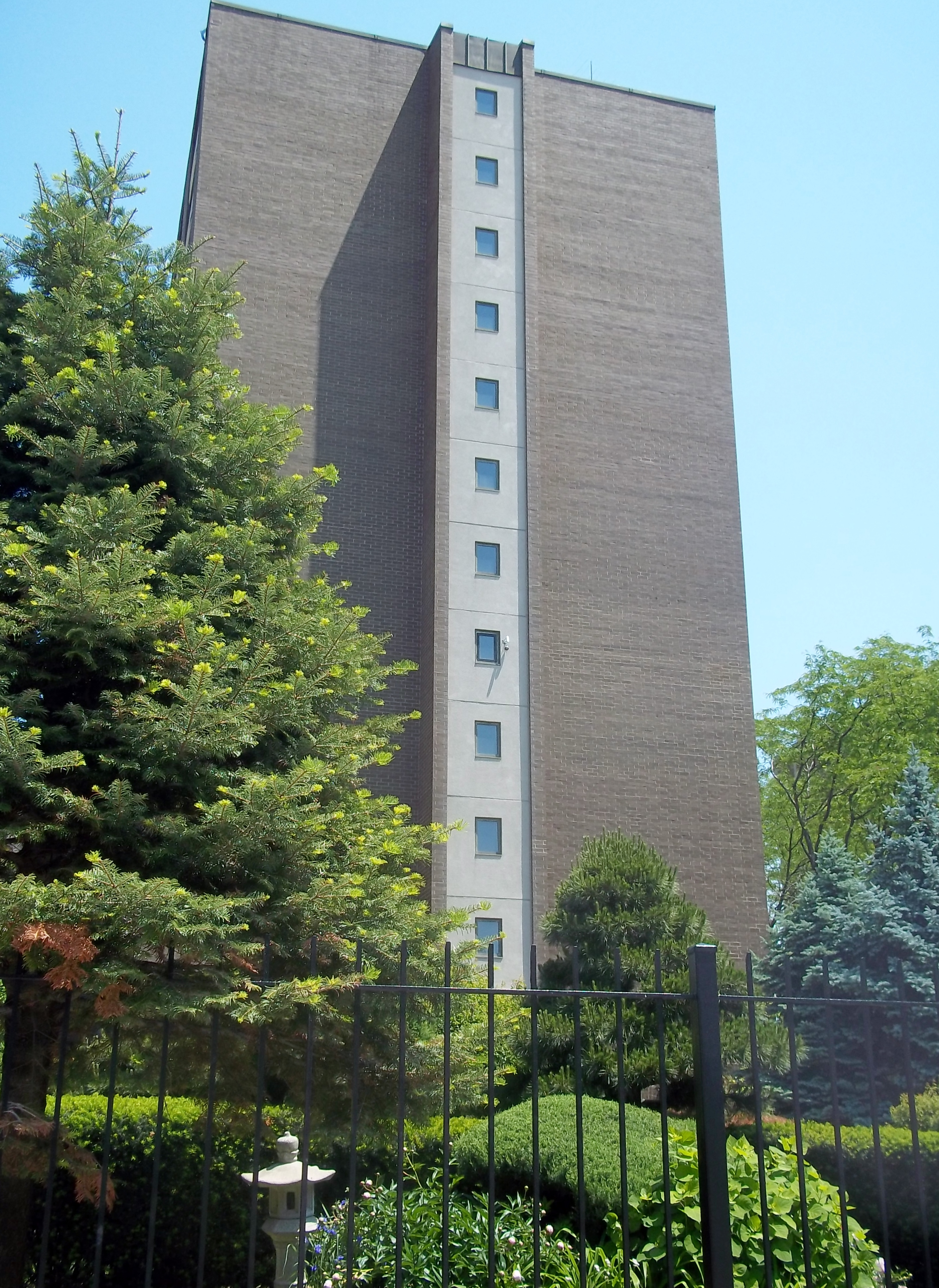
Heiwa Terrace

The Consulate General of Japan at Chicago (在シカゴ日本国総領事館 Zai Shikago Nippon-koku Sōryōjikan) is in the Olympia Centre in the Near North Side of Chicago.

There was a Japanese Mutual Aid Society. In the pre-World War II era there was a YMCA mission that served Japanese students. During the 1930s the mission closed.

== Economy ==
In the Chicago area, 60% of Japanese people work in professional and white collar jobs.

Many Japanese companies have their U.S. headquarters in Hoffman Estates and Schaumburg. The Mitsuwa Marketplace, a shopping center owned by Japanese in Arlington Heights, opened around 1981.

== Media ==
The Chicago Shimpo is a Japanese-American newspaper published in Arlington Heights. Other media include the Japanese American Service Committee Newsletter; Weekly J-Angle (ジャングル）; Q Magazine (Qマガジン); The JACLer, the newsletter of the JACL; Prairie Magazine (プレーリー); Pavilion (パビリオン); and US Shimbun's Chicago section.

== Anime set in Chicago ==
This List contains the anime and manga the city of Chicago has been based on Japanese culture.

- 91 Days (2016)
- Attack on Titan (2013-2023)
- Baccano! (2008)
- Beastars (2019)
- Cells at Work! Code Black (2021)
- Estab Life (2022)
- Goblin Slayer (2018)
- Go! Go! Loser Ranger! (2021)
- Gunsmith Cats (1995-1996)
- Josee, the Tiger and the Fish (2020 film) (2020)
- Riding Bean (1989)
- Super Crooks (2022)
- The Eminence in Shadow (2022-present)

== Education ==
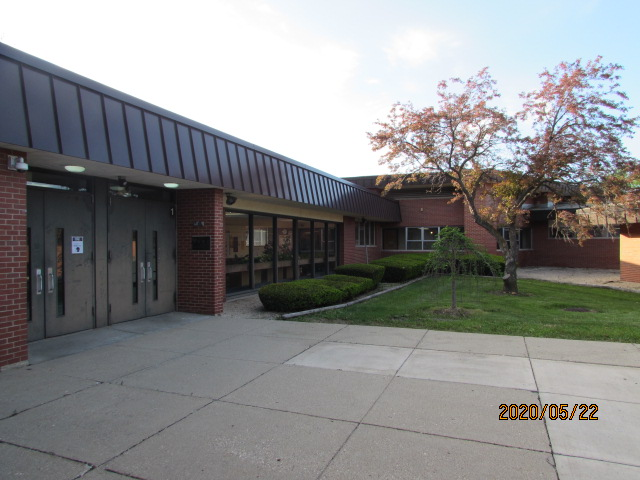
Chicago Futabakai Japanese School

The Chicago Futabakai Japanese School is located in Arlington Heights, Illinois. The Chicago Futabakai Japanese School Saturday school first opened in the North Side in May 1966. The Saturday school moved to Skokie, Illinois, in May 1978. At that time, the day school opened in Skokie, with four teachers sent by the Japanese government. In August 1984 the Saturday school and day school moved to Niles, Illinois. The current campus in Arlington Heights opened on Monday April 6, 1998, and classes at that location began on Friday April 10, 1998.

There was a Japanese school in the pre-World War II era.

== Religion ==
The Buddhist Temple of Chicago was founded in 1944. The Midwest Buddhist Temple, a Japanese Buddhist temple, opened in 1972. In the pre-World War II era there were Japanese Christian churches and Buddhist temples.

== See also ==
- Demographics of Chicago
- Murder of Evelyn Okubo
