= Monika Kehoe =

American educator 1909 – 2004

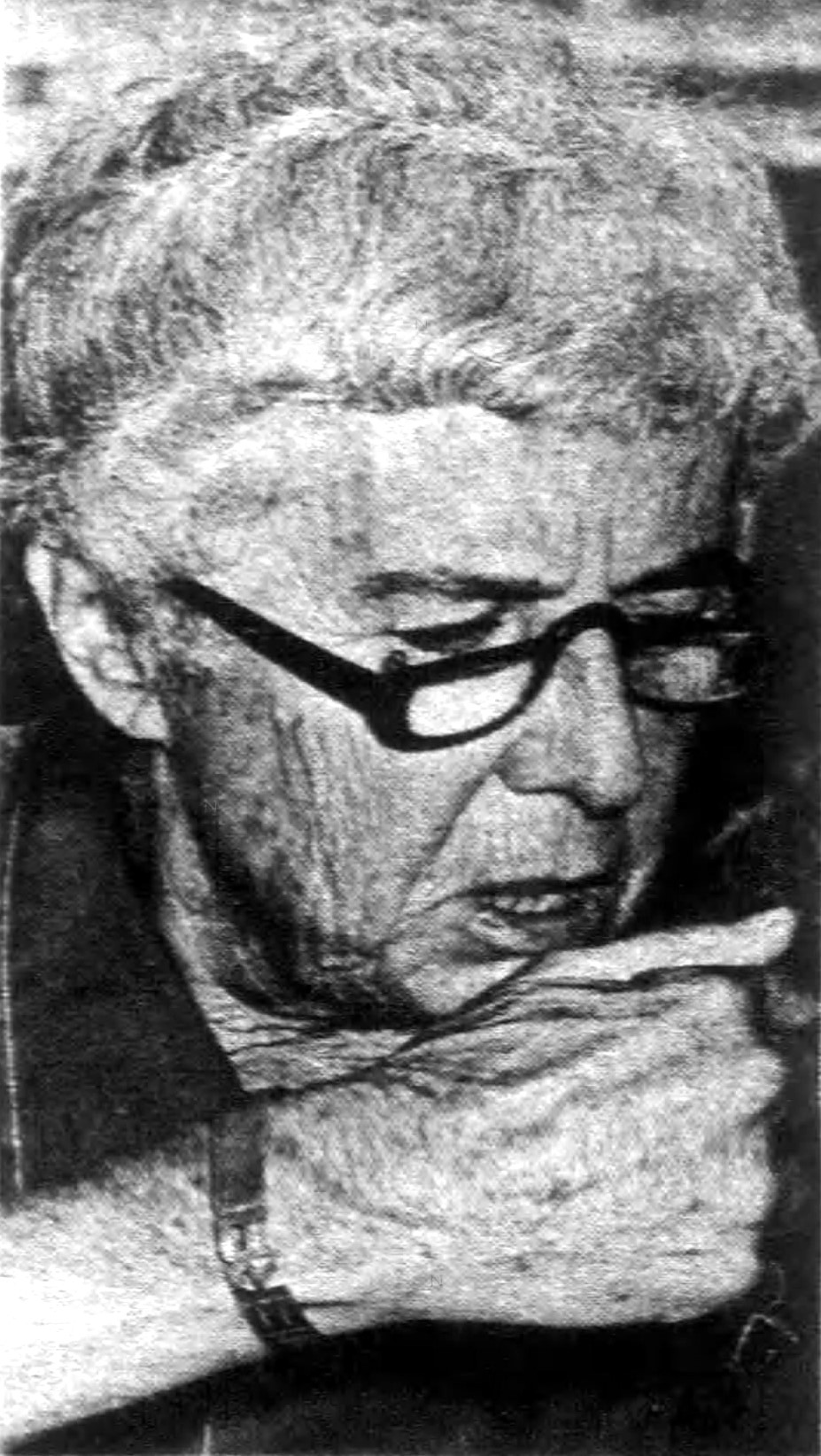
- Kehoe, 1974
- Born: Monica Gretchen Kehoe; September 11, 1909; Dayton, Ohio, US
- Died: November 16, 2004 (aged 95); San Francisco, California, US
- Occupations: Academic, LGBTQ activist
- Years active: 1935-1989

Monika Kehoe (September 11, 1909 – November 16, 2004) was a pioneering American educator, who focused on training teachers of English as a second language, as well as on women's studies, and aging in the LGBTQ community. Born in Dayton, Ohio, and raised as Catholic, she attended parochial schools in Fort Wayne, Indiana, received a bachelor's degree at Mary Manse College and went on to earn a doctorate at Ohio State University in 1935. She taught English literature and applied linguistics in the United States, Korea, Japan, Australia, Ethiopia, Canada, and Guam. One of the pioneers who turned learning English as a second language into an academic endeavor, she taught English to Korean and Japanese civil servants who worked with American and Allied administrators after World War II and during the Korean War. She also created the first curricula for instructors teaching English as a second language in Canada in the 1960s.

Kehoe began writing while serving as the adult education director at the Japanese internment camp at Gila River in Arizona. She was the first human resources guidance counselor for the United Nations. In 1974, Kehoe founded the women's studies courses at the University of Guam and in 1980 began some of the first investigations into the issues impacting aging lesbians and homosexuals. Although she recognized during her youth that she was attracted to women, Kehoe did not have words to describe her sexual orientation and did not come out until the late 1970s. She is remembered primarily for her pioneering LGBTQ studies. A scholarship bearing her name is given to queer students in need of financial assistance at Mills College in Oakland, California.

== Early life, education, and family ==
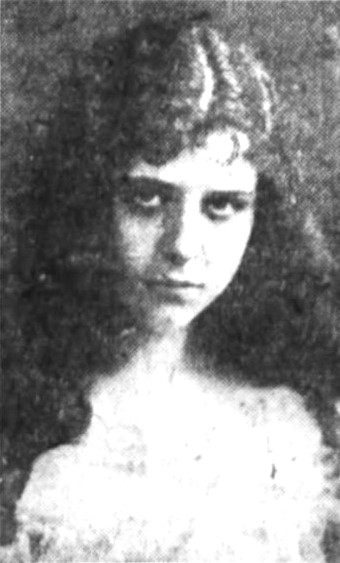
Kehoe at age 13

Monica Gretchen Kehoe was born on September 11, 1909, in Dayton, Ohio, to Josephine Marie (née Martin) and Thomas J. Kehoe. Her father was from Canada and was of Irish heritage, while her mother was born in Indiana and was of French heritage. They spent some of her childhood in Ohio, but by around 1916 they family were living in Fort Wayne, Indiana. Her parents divorced after 1920 and thereafter Kehoe lived with her mother. She began studying music with the Sisters of Providence at St. Catherine's Academy, at Saint Patrick's Catholic Church in Fort Wayne. She studied piano from the age of seven, and two years later learned violin. From 1921, she took voice lesions and was known in her childhood as a promising musician. She attended the parochial grammar school at Saint Patrick's and in 1923 entered high school at St. Catherine's. She graduated from St. Augustine Academy in Fort Wayne, in 1927, and the following year Kehoe and her mother spent traveling in Europe.

In 1928, Kehoe entered Mary Manse College, a Catholic women's tertiary institution in Toledo, Ohio. While attending Mary Manse, she lived with an aunt, Mary Tompkins, and participated in the college's theater performances. She graduated in 1932 with a bachelor's degree in English and went on to study for her doctorate at Ohio State University. During her university days, Kehoe began to use the spelling Monika, and became active in swimming and tennis competitions. At one point she was the city diving champion of Toledo, and also ranked in various tennis matches. She became aware of her attraction to women, although she did not identify as a lesbian (or know of the concept) until later in life, and she chose an androgynous style of dress, preferring men's fashions. In 1934, Kehoe's mother remarried, but her second husband proved to be a bigamous fraudster, who had fourteen wives. He stole $17,000 (equivalent to $399,211 in 2025) from Kehoe and her mother and although they sued for the return of their money, Kehoe later admitted she would not have been able to complete her education had she not received a scholarship. She completed her PhD in English language and literature, with a dissertation on the poet Francis Thompson, graduating in 1935. Wanting to continue her education, Kehoe applied for admittance to undertake a divinity degree in Toronto, Canada, but was rejected because she was a woman. The rejection impacted her dedication to Catholicism and turned her focus toward teaching.

== Career ==
=== Early teaching career (1935–1941) ===
Kehoe began teaching at Mundelein College in Chicago in 1935, and while there began an affair with one of her students. The affair prompted her to seek employment at a secular school after one year. She was hired at Mills College in 1936, and moved to Oakland, California with her partner. Her partner worked as a secretary at the college and the first year they were at Mills, they lived in a dormitory. In 1937, Kehoe built a small cabin off campus for them to have more privacy. The couple lived in the cabin together for two years, although Kehoe spent part of that time studying in New York City. She returned to Mills College in 1939. When she tried to break off the relationship because of an involvement with another woman, her partner outed her to the administration. Historian Greg Robinson, who wrote a biography of Kehoe, stated she "was saved from immediate termination" by announcing her engagement to a man, but the engagement was a fabrication and the man was one of Kehoe's cousins. The following year, when her contract ended, Kehoe was hired to teach at Holy Names College in Windsor, Ontario. She remained in Canada until 1941, and returned to the United States after the bombing of Pearl Harbor.

=== Adult education and TESL (1941–1970) ===
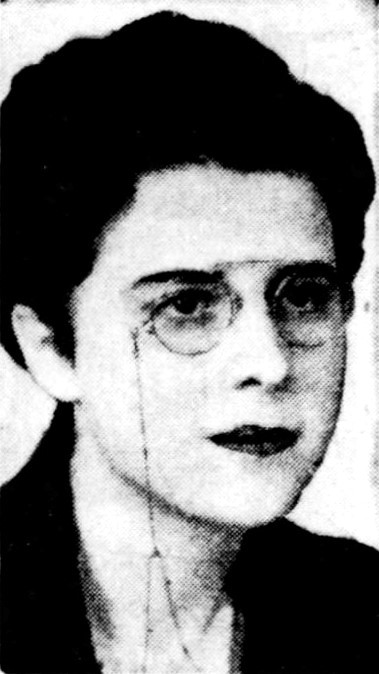
Kehoe in 1940

Kehoe worked in Detroit, Michigan as an adult education director for the United States Housing Authority. She taught older, mostly illiterate residents at the Sojourner Truth Project. While on the project, she met and became involved with a woman named Karon, who legally changed her surname to Kehoe. They lived together, posing as half-sisters. When black tenants moved into units in 1942, race riots broke out, causing the couple to ask to be transferred to another housing project. The request was granted and they moved to San Pedro, California to work at the Wilmington Houses Project. Kehoe taught adult literacy classes to migrant war workers and Karon organized recreation activities for youth in the project. That fall, they were recruited for the War Relocation Authority and were sent to work at the Japanese internment camp at Gila River in Arizona. Kehoe first served as a vocational and student relocation advisor, but by September 1943 she became director of adult education at the camp. She oversaw teaching courses for those learning English (TESL), as well as vocational training. At that time, TESL courses were just emerging as part of the academic field of applied linguistics and Kehoe, according to writer Laureen Sweeney, was a pioneer in the field. Kehoe recruited the wives of other staff members to help with teaching. The camp conditions and daily temperatures of around 120 °F (49 °C) caused her to use her off-hours to seek new employment. During her time in the camp, she published articles about adult education in Common Ground, which pushed the official line of assimilation, but articles published by her after she left the camp in the Friends Intelligencer, a Quaker magazine, urged compassion, community acceptance, and resettlement assistance for those who had been imprisoned. (Note: Karon also published about their time in the camp, writing City in the Sun, a fictionalized account of camp activities in 1946.)

Kehoe was hired to lead and coordinate an experimental personnel program launched at Brooklyn College. The program was an orientation for parents and students to acquaint them with the policies, procedures, and goals of the school. Kehoe and Karon left the camp in February 1944 and drove cross-country to Brooklyn, where they rented an apartment together. When the couple broke up two years later, Kehoe signed up as an education specialist with the War Department. She was sent to South Korea in 1946, where she oversaw TESL training for Korean officials working for the United States Army Military Government in Korea and established education programs for Chinese and North Korean prisoners who were interned during the Korean War. She returned to the United States in 1948, and became the United Nations Personnel Bureau's first human relations staff counselor. Kehoe was arrested for publicly displaying affection to another woman in New York City in 1950, (Note: Robinson stated that local police had created a dossier on Kehoe previously when she was rounded up during the lavender raids at nightclubs in New York City.) and fired from her post. She immediately was hired to work for the State Department, and sent to Tokyo, Japan to work with the Allied administration, as a language specialist for TESL courses. When she attended a tennis match with one of the staff secretaries, it was discovered that they had spent the night together in a hotel. Kehoe was dismissed and repatriated to the United States in 1951, (Note: Robinson said that the incident barred her from government employment for three years, and caused her to be interrogated by the FBI. Such interrogations were common during the MCarthy era, when homosexuality was frequently linked with subversive activities.) but found work with the New York Department of Education in the adult education division, simultaneously teaching evening classes at Russell Sage College in Albany, New York. Her lectures and work for the New York Department of Education focused on human relations and developing student and worker confidence to enable them to be more productive. After three years, Kehoe resigned, and moved to Sydney, Australia to work in the adult education programs of the Colombo Plan for the Commonwealth Office of Education. She met the coordinator of the Colombo Plan's placement and training for foreign students, Margaret Gillett, while in Sydney, and the two women became friends.

When Kehoe decided to return to Russell Sage College in 1957, she invited Gillett to join her and helped her get a scholarship at the school to complete a master's degree. They sailed from Australia together, stopping in Jakarta, Singapore, Bangkok, Rangoon, Calcutta, Delhi, Karachi, Baghdad, Damascus, Beirut, Jerusalem, Istanbul, Athens, Rome, Madrid, and Lisbon. Kehoe taught for one term as a professor of psychology, and acting chair of the department. In 1959 and 1960, she worked as a book editor for Youth Education System Books, which published study guides for students preparing for high school, college board, or scholarship examinations. Gillett finished her PhD and began teaching at Dalhousie University in Halifax, Nova Scotia in 1961. That year, Kehoe moved to Ethiopia to serve as the dean of women at Haile Selassie I University and invited Gillett to apply as a faculty member. When her first term ended at Dalhousie, Gillett flew to Addis Ababa to join Kehoe. In addition to her work as dean of women, Kehoe served as an advisor to the Ethiopian Ministry of Education on TESL. They returned to Canada together in 1964, moving to Montreal, where Kehoe became a professor of applied linguistics at Marianopolis College and Gillett a professor in the education department at McGill University. At Marianopolis, Kehoe set up the first undergraduate TESL training course in Canada. The course was designed to train instructors to teach English to students whose primary language was not English. In 1968, Kehoe and Gillett published a novel that they had been researching for eight years. The Laurel and the Poppy was about the 19th-century English poet Francis Thompson, who despite his laudanum addiction was ranked along with Elizabeth Barrett Browning and Alfred, Lord Tennyson as one of the great poets of his era. The book was published by Vanguard Press in the United States, and later by Copp Clark Publishers in Canada. It was selected as the best book of March 1968 by the Catholic Digest's book club.

=== Women's and gender studies (1971–1989) ===
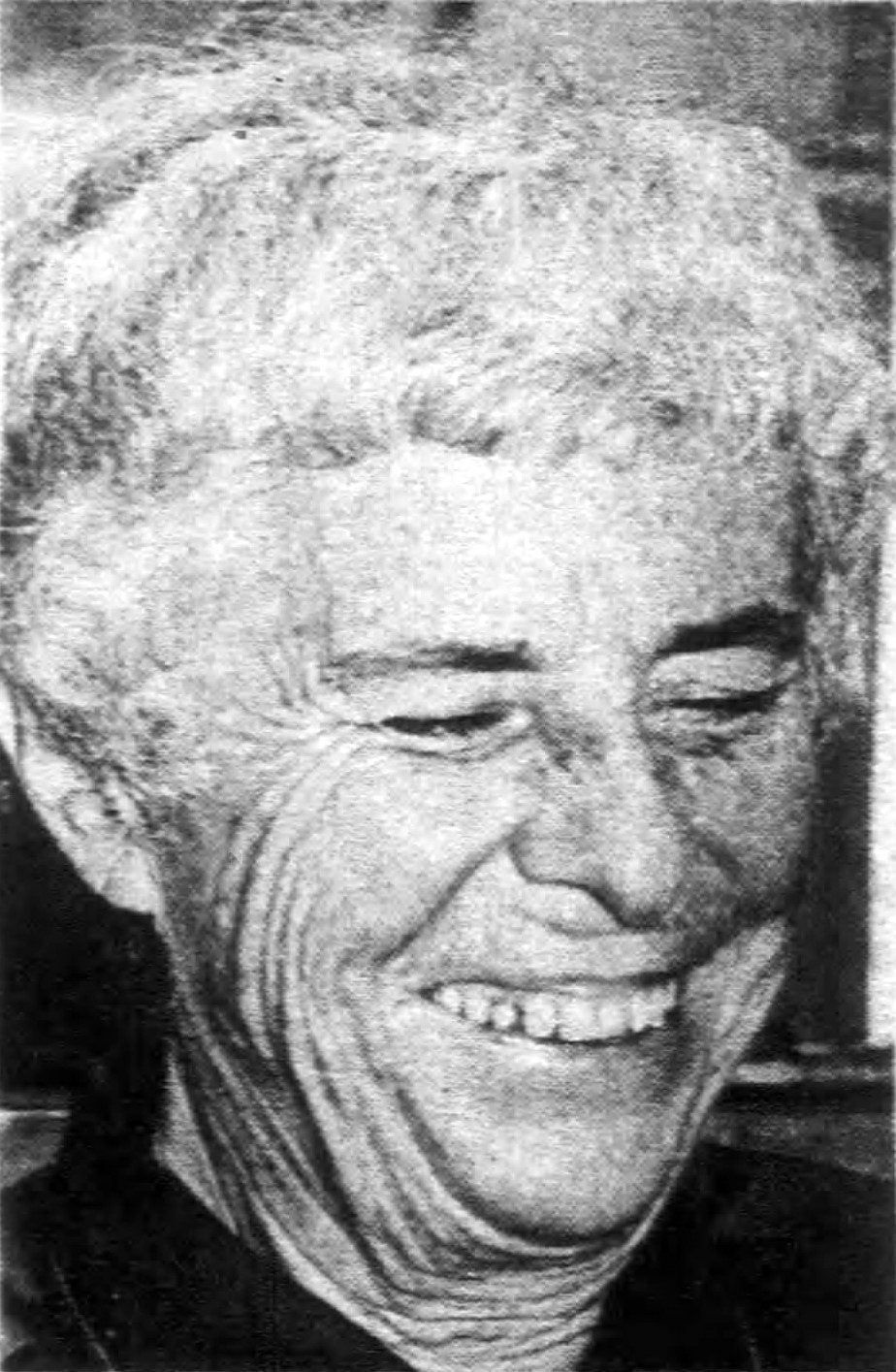
Kehoe in 1974

Kehoe left Canada in 1971 and took a post to teach English at the University of Guam. She studied Guamanian linguistics and concluded that children in Guam spoke "neither classic English nor Chamorro", but rather a dialect which used English vocabulary and Chamorro syntax. She also observed that while Chamorro was the primary language before World War II, post-war, most children were taught the local dialect of English. In 1974, the Supreme Court ruling Lau v. Nichols stated that public school systems in United States jurisdictions were required to provide assistance to children who had a limited English proficiency, to enable their education to be meaningful. The government of Guam established a program under the direction of Kehoe to train teachers' aides to assist children who did not speak adequate English. The course she designed taught instructors to use play and interaction to help children learn words, rather than rote recitation or copying words. Kehoe had been a feminist for many years and was a member of the Guam Organization for Women. She introduced the first women's studies course at the University of Guam in 1974. The course examined the status and role of women in society as it had changed over time. Unlike struggles to have courses approved in the United States, Kehoe said she had no difficulty obtaining approval for the course in Guam. The course was expanded the following semester to include analysis of the way women had been portrayed in literary works. She attended the 1975 International Women's Year conference hosted by the United Nations in Mexico City, but was disturbed by some of the radical women's behavior and noted the divides in the demands of women between the Global North and Global South. Kehoe retired from the university in 1977 and moved to San Francisco.

Within a year, Kehoe had come out publicly and was giving public lectures on sexuality. She became active with LGBTQ as well as in feminist right's groups. She was hired by the Center for Women Scholars in 1980, to direct the publication of a Handbook for Women Scholars. The book, published in 1982, documented discrimination in academia, provided advocacy information, and included interviews with feminists of diverse racial background. Simultaneously in 1980, she began working at San Francisco State University in the Center for Research and Education in Sexuality, directing a study on aging lesbians. She conducted nationwide interviews of lesbians over age 65, and her research formed the basis of a course she taught at San Francisco State, "Lesbian and Gay Aging". Brian de Vries, a gerontology professor at the university, stated in an article published in the Bay Area Reporter that Kehoe's offering was likely the first course in the nation on aging gay and lesbian people. In 1984, she broadened her study to include lesbians over 60 years old and began presenting her findings at conferences and publishing them in the Journal of Homosexuality. She published findings in book form in Historical, Literary, and Erotic Aspects of Lesbianism in 1986 and as Lesbians Over 60 Speak for Themselves in 1989. The 1986 book addressed change and variances in lesbian history and depictions and thoughts on sexuality as presented in literary works. Lesbians Over 60 examined the unwillingness of many of her subjects to be open about their sexuality, which made them unknown and invisible to sexologists and gerontologists. She began writing an autobiography, Making of a Deviant: A Model for Androgyny and published excerpts under the names of Helen Trent and Isabeth McTeigue in The Lesbian Path (1985), by Margaret Cruikshank. Another segment was published in Gifts of Age by Charlotte Painter in 1985, under her own name.

== Later life, death, and legacy ==
Kehoe remained active well into her 80s. She attended aerobics classes, lifted weights, and played tennis. As she aged she shifted to walking and croquet. She died on November 16, 2004, in San Francisco. Papers related to Kehoe's research on bilingualism can be found in the McGill University Archives, and the typed manuscript of her unpublished autobiography is located at the F. W. Olin Library at Mills College at Northeastern University. Her estate created a scholarship in her name at Mills College to assist LGBTQ students with financial need in obtaining an education.

Her work on aging and lesbianism is remembered as some of the first scholarship to examine the health, personal, and social concerns of aging lesbians. Sheryl Goldberg, Joanna Sickler, and Suzanne L. Dibble, researchers at the School of Nursing at the University of California, San Francisco called her work "groundbreaking", pointing out that only a few small-sampling studies had preceded her work. They re-examined her findings in 2005 and determined that although Kehoe's work was done twenty years in the past, her analysis remained relevant. They noted that her findings, that older lesbians had diverse lives, often socialized with a network of friends, typically did not maintain close family ties, and often did not use public services because of fear of discrimination, were confirmed by their own research.

== Selected works ==
=== Education ===
- Kehoe, Monika (February 1949). "Higher Education in Korea". The Far Eastern Quarterly. 8 (2). Durham, North Carolina: Duke University Press: 184–186. doi:10.2307/2049141. ISSN 0363-6917. JSTOR 2049141. OCLC 5545307368.
- Gillett, Margaret; Kehoe, Monika (September 1958). "The Colombo Plan: An East- West Adult Education Project". Adult Education. 9 (1). Washington, D. C.: American Association for Adult and Continuing Education: 36–40. doi:10.1177/074171365800900110. ISSN 0001-8481. OCLC 4653104612. – via Sage Publishing (subscription required)
- Kehoe, Monika (December 1962). "Higher Education in Ethiopia: A Report on Haile Selassie I University". The Journal of Higher Education. 33 (9). Columbus, Ohio: Ohio State University Press: 475–478. doi:10.1080/00221546.1962.11773504. ISSN 0022-1546. JSTOR 1979875. OCLC 5545254509.
- Kehoe, Monika (1968). Applied Linguistics: A Survey for Language Teachers. New York, New York: The MacMillan Company. OCLC 1341172984.

=== Literature ===
- Gillett, Margaret; Kehoe, Monika (1967). The Laurel and the Poppy: A Novel About the Life of Francis Thompson, 1859–1907. New York, New York: Vanguard Press. OCLC 953110.
- Kehoe, Monika (1993). The Making of a Deviant: A Model for Androgyny. Oakland, California: (unpublished manuscript). OCLC 898223581.

=== Gender studies ===
- Spencer, Mary L. (1982). Kehoe, Monika (ed.). Handbook for Women Scholars: Strategies for Success (1st ed.). San Francisco, California: Center for Women Scholars, Americas Behavioral Research Corporation. OCLC 9375272.
- Kehoe, Monika (1984). "The Making of a Deviant". In Cruikshank, Margaret (ed.). New Lesbian Writing: An Anthology. San Francisco, California: Grey Fox Press. pp. 137–146. ISBN 978-0-912516-81-3.
- Kehoe, Monika (1986). Historical, Literary, and Erotic Aspects of Lesbianism. New York, New York: Harrington Park Press. ISBN 978-0-918393-21-0.
- Kehoe, Monika (August 1986). "Lesbians Over 65: A Triply Invisible Minority". Journal of Homosexuality. 12 (3–4). Abingdon-on-Thames, Oxfordshire: Routledge: 139–152. doi:10.1300/J082v12n03_12. ISSN 0091-8369. OCLC 4656614957. PMID 3760557.
- Kehoe, Monika (1989). Lesbians Over 60 Speak for Themselves. New York, New York: Harrington Park Press. ISBN 978-0-918393-55-5.
