= Margaret Gillett =

Australian-Canadian academic

- Gillett, 1966
- Born: 1 February 1930; Wingham, New South Wales, Australia
- Died: 19 October 2019 (aged 89); Montreal, Quebec, Canada
- Occupations: Academic, women's studies pioneer
- Years active: 1964–1995

Margaret Gillett (1 February 1930 – 19 October 2019) was an Australian-Canadian academic. She introduced women's studies to McGill University and founded the McGill Journal of Education, serving as its editor-in-chief from 1965 to 1977. Born in Wingham, New South Wales, Australia, Gillett earned her bachelor's degree and a Diploma of Education from the University of Sydney in 1950. She completed a master's degree at Russell Sage College in 1958, and a PhD in education at Columbia University in 1962. After working at Haile Selassie I University in Ethiopia as a registrar for two years, she was hired as an associate professor of education at McGill University in Montreal, Canada in 1964. She became a full professor in 1967 and worked at McGill until her retirement in 1994.

Gillett wrote two major works on education, A History of Education (1966) and Foundation Studies in Education (1973), before shifting her focus to women's studies. She offered two of the first courses on women in education at McGill University. From 1975, she advocated for the inclusion of a women's studies curriculum as an interdisciplinary minor, which was finally approved in the late 1970s. Her book We Walked Very Warily: A History of Women at McGill was a ground-breaking text as at the time it was published, there were no published volumes evaluating higher education in Canada or covering women who had acquired a university education. In 1988, she became the first director of the McGill Centre for Research and Teaching on Women. Her pioneering role in creating a new field of study at McGill was recognized by her being honoured with the Governor General's Persons Award in 1996 and the Royal Society of Canada's Award in Gender Studies in 2004. The Margaret Gillett Award for Research on Women has been granted by McGill University in her honour since 1994.

== Early life and education ==
Margaret Gillett was born on 1 February 1930, in Wingham, New South Wales, Australia, to Janet Alene (née Vickers) and Leslie Frank Gillett. She was the youngest child among older sisters, Betty and Kathleen, and brothers, Allen and Robert. Gillett attended the Pymble Ladies' College and then completed a bachelor's degree and Diploma of Education at the University of Sydney in 1950. After her graduation, she taught in the New South Wales education system before moving to London, to work as a supply teacher for two years. Returning to Sydney in 1954, she began working as an administrator of the Colombo Plan for the Commonwealth Office of Education. Through her work, she met Monika Kehoe, an American teacher who was involved in the programme. Kehoe had formerly been employed at Russell Sage College in Troy, New York, and when she decided to return to the United States, she asked Gillett to join her. Kehoe helped Gillett secure a scholarship in 1957, which was offered jointly by the college and Altrusa International, Inc, to continue her education. They sailed from Australia together, stopping in Jakarta, Singapore, Bangkok, Rangoon, Calcutta, Delhi, Karachi, Baghdad, Damascus, Beirut, Jerusalem, Istanbul, Athens, Rome, Madrid, and Lisbon. Gillett completed a master's degree at Russell Sage, with her dissertation Learned Ladies in Sixteenth Century England: As Reflected in Writings of the Time. In 1959, she taught briefly at a private girls' school in California, before moving to New York City to complete her doctorate at Columbia University in 1962, with a dissertation on the Colombo Plan.

== Career ==
Having completed her studies, Gillett moved to Halifax, Nova Scotia and began teaching at Dalhousie University in 1961. Kehoe had moved to Ethiopia and was serving as the dean of women at Haile Selassie I University. She invited Gillett to apply for one of the faculty vacancies. Without receiving a response to her application, Gillett flew to Addis Ababa as soon as the term ended. She was hired as a registrar at the university and worked there for two years, before moving with Kehoe to Montreal in 1964. Gillett was hired as "the chair of the department of the history of philosophy of education at McGill University" and Kehoe taught English and served as chair of applied linguistics at Marianopolis College. In 1965, Gillett founded the McGill Journal of Education, and was its editor-in-chief until 1977. Under her tenure the journal became an internationally recognized publication. The following year, she published A History of Education: Thought and Practice and was advised by her publisher to use only her first initial and surname to disguise her gender. At the time, there were few books published that did not include systemic sexual biases against women. (Note: Reporter Barbara Yaffe, stated that in 1976 only one out of the fifty short stories used in the Quebec Schools Grade 11 Anthology had a woman as the main character. Gillett said that women's contributions were ignored as frivolous, and they were routinely "edited out of history", particularly in history, literature, and math textbooks.) She became a full professor in McGill's education department in 1967.

In addition to scholarly works, in 1968, Gillett and Kehoe published a novel in 1968 that they had been researching for eight years. The Laurel and the Poppy was about the 19th-century English poet Francis Thompson, who despite his laudanum addiction was ranked along with Elizabeth Barrett Browning and Alfred, Lord Tennyson as one of the great poets of his era. The book was published by Vanguard Press in the United States, and later by Copp Clark Publishers in Canada. It was selected as the best book of March 1968 by the Catholic Digest′s book club. In the early 1970s, Kehoe, whom Gillett said "was the most significant influence on her life", left Canada and moved to Guam. At around the same time, Gillett began meeting academic women in Montreal, such as Margret Andersen of Loyola College, Christine Garside Allen and Greta Nemiroff of Sir George Williams University, Marie-Andrée Bertrand of the Université de Montréal and Mona Forrest and Jackie Manthorne of the Montreal Women's Centre who were offering courses in women's studies. There was no consolidated degree programme in the field at any university in Montreal, but Gillett began teaching a course, "Social Foundations of Education", at McGill that was focused on women in 1972 and pressed the university to establish a formal programme. She soon added a second course, "Women in Higher Education" and encouraged other faculty members to include courses focused on women. To convince the university of the need, she spoke regularly at women's groups and academic conferences about women. In honour of the United Nations designating 1975 as International Women's Year, she created a special issue (volume 10 issue 1) of the McGill Journal of Education focusing on women's education.

Receiving a grant for a study, Gillett and her colleagues surveyed other staff members, and discovered that there were nine courses giving credit for classes focused on women. The analysis, completed in December 1975, confirmed interest by various disciplines and faculties and recommended that an official women's studies programme be established. Although there were those who did not support creating the curricula, an advisory board was established in 1976, and after several years of lobbying, the proponents finally gained approval to begin offering an interdisciplinary minor in women's studies. Gillett spent several years researching and compiling her data on the history of the early women students at McGill. Her book We Walked Very Warily: A History of Women at McGill was published in 1981, was the first major research project to evaluate higher education of women in Canada. She was appointed to the William C. Macdonald Professor of Education chair in 1982. Continuing her work on women, Gillett compiled A Fair Shake: Autobiographical Essays by McGill Women with Kay Sibbald in 1984. The book followed up on the lives of thirty-one of the women from We Walked Very Warily. Remaining active with women's groups, Gillett served as president of the Canadian delegation of the United Nations Commission on the Status of Women in 1986. After advocating for establishment of a research centre for women for thirteen years, the university created the McGill Centre for Research and Teaching on Women in 1988 and Gillett was appointed as its first director. That year, she was awarded an honorary LL.D by the University of Saskatchewan, for her work on women's history. Shortly after it was created, Gillett resigned from the directorship, based on what she called a dispute over "feminist values", in the administration of the centre.

In 1994, the Margaret Gillett Award for Research on Women was established by McGill in her honour and Gillett retired and was granted the status of professor emeritus the following year. Our Own Agendas edited by Gillett and Anne Beer and published in 1995, again provided autobiographical accounts of women, but differed from A Fair Shake in that contributors were more open about previously taboo topics, such as abortion, rape, and sexual orientation. She also edited with Sibbald and Elizabeth Rowlinson, A Fair Shake Revisited in 1996. That year, she received the Governor General's Persons Award. The award commemorates the lengthy battle in Canada for women to be "recognized as persons" and specifically chose Gillett for her innovation in introducing women's studies courses, which helped women achieve equality in Canadian society. McGill finally instituted a major in feminist studies in 1997. Gillett was asked to write the history of Trafalgar School for Girls for the school's 113th reunion. The book was published by the school in 2000. Her pioneering contributions to women's studies were recognized in 2004, when she was honoured by the Royal Society of Canada with its Award in Gender Studies.

== Academic reception ==
Alex S. Mowat, chair of the education department of Dalhousie University called A History of Education "new and fresh" because it included both educational theory and practice, and was written with an international point of view. While noting that some important figures were underrepresented and some details could have been omitted from the volume, Mowat said that it "successfully compressed an astonishing amount of information" into its 400 pages. Martena Sasnett, coordinator of international education studies at the University of California, Los Angeles, stated that it was "the first book to give a genuinely historical-international perspective" to educational theory and practices and to include non-Western cultural contributions. Gillett pointed out that she had also included information on women's education, but at that point in her career, most of her work centered on education, rather than gender. Her other major work in this period was Foundation Studies in Education co-edited with John A. Laska. The book, according to reviewer Emma M. Cappelluzzo, provided a clear guide to codify and justify the elements of what should be included in the foundations of education policy. It covered theoretical perspectives on education as a field of study and in-depth analysis of the purposes of scholarly inquiry and teacher training. It also evaluated requirements of teacher preparedness and the incorporation of new technology and methods.

Nancy M. Sheehan, a historian from the University of Calgary, commented on the difficulty of writing We Walked Very Warily, considering that the history of higher education in Canada had not yet been written. Sheehan acknowledged that without knowing the underlying influences that led to the creation of McGill, the founders' attitudes towards women, and details about the male student body, what led them to seek higher education and what their experiences were, it would be difficult to judge how women's experiences varied or what the reaction to them entering the university would be. She stated the context of social class, which excluded most people from higher education, was not adequately covered. Women's studies historian, Veronica Strong-Boag concurred that class was an element that required further investigation. Sheehan also lamented the lack of investigation of the women students' lives after they left university, because that made it impossible to judge whether higher education influenced their later lives. Despite its shortcomings, Sheehan praised Gillett's skillful treatment of evaluating women's place in society and how the prevailing ideas against educating women were challenged by the admittance of women to university. She acknowledged that Gillett's book was a pioneering work and hoped that it would lead to further "critical analysis of the role of higher education in Canadian society". Strong-Boag stated that, given that the material presented covered the period from the middle of the nineteenth century to the 1970s, it contributed substantially to knowledge of the higher education of women and in Canada in general, but was disappointing in that there were so many potential topics that were not covered, in spite of Gillett's "impressive" research.

A Fair Shake, according to reviewer Marjory Lang of the University of British Columbia, focused on some of the early McGill women students previously featured in We Walked Very Warily. It discussed their professional lives, thoughts on Canadian society, and the impact of their education. Lang said that in telling their stories, the women were able to show their successes, in spite of obstacles, and illuminate the precarious nature of their professional lives. A Fair Shake Revisited released in 1996, updated the stories of seventeen of the contributing autobiographers from the original book. A sequel to the previous autobiographical compilations, Our Own Agendas contained the stories of twenty-eight graduates of McGill from a broad spectrum of age ranges, cultures, professions with varying perceptions of feminism. The autobiographies were written by women who pursued teaching, science, the priesthood, medicine, and other fields. Their stories are diverse and touch on themes of disability, discrimination, indigeneity, racism, and sexual violence. Scholar Anne Drummond stated that the women told their stories courageously and with frankness, which showed that in the decade between publication of A Fair Shake and Our Own Agendas the women who had attended McGill had more power and were willing to take more risks. She praised Gillett and Beer for publishing works that promoted feminist studies. Marianne Gosztonyi Ainley of the University of Northern British Columbia stated that We Walked Very Warily was an "eye-opener" and surprised many readers who did not know the history of women as students at McGill. She said that when A Fair Shake was written, to commemorate the centennial celebrations for admittance of women to McGill, it was met with excitement. With the release of Our Own Agendas, Ainsley recognized the "even richer variety of essays" which allowed the reader to glimpse into the lives and thoughts of the women behind their public personas, providing educational insight into various types of feminist thought.

== Death and legacy ==
Gillett died on 19 October 2019, in Montreal. Her professional papers, consisting primarily of correspondence, notes and drafts of her publications, are housed at the McGill University Archives. She is remembered not only for her pioneering efforts to create a women's studies programme at McGill, but for striving to raise awareness of the inequalities that women faced at the university. She was known for expanding the feminist networks at McGill which eventually, according to sociologist Suzanne Staggenborg, led the university to adopt policies which "eliminat[ed] sexist regulations, practices, and language", including a sexual harassment policy and the development of campus safety protocols.

== Selected works ==
=== Education ===
- Gillett, Margaret; Kehoe, Monika (September 1958). "The Colombo Plan: An East- West Adult Education Project". Adult Education. 9 (1). Washington, D. C.: American Association for Adult and Continuing Education: 36–40. doi:10.1177/074171365800900110. ISSN 0001-8481. OCLC 4653104612. – via Sage Publishing (subscription required)
- Gillett, Margaret (1962). The Colombo Plan and Australia's Role in Its International Education Program (PhD degree). New York, New York: Columbia University. OCLC 49042907.
- Gillett, M. (1966). A History of Education: Thought and Practice. Toronto, Ontario: McGraw-Hill Company of Canada. OCLC 570065567.
- Gillett, Margaret, ed. (1969). Readings in the History of Education. Toronto, Ontario: McGraw-Hill Company of Canada. OCLC 1392315509.
- Gillett, Margaret (1973). Educational Technology: Toward Demystification. Scarborough, Canada: Prentice Hall of Canada. ISBN 978-0-13-240648-2.
- Gillett, Margaret; Laska, John A., eds. (1973). Foundation Studies in Education: Justifications and New Directions. Metuchen, New Jersey: Scarecrow Press. ISBN 978-0-8108-0671-9.

=== Women's Studies ===
- Gillett, Margaret (1958). Learned Ladies in Sixteenth Century England: As Reflected in Writings of the Time (master's degree). Troy, New York: Russell Sage College. OCLC 30013723.
- Gillett, Margaret (1976). "Self-Disclosure and the Women's Movement". Canadian Journal of Education. 1 (3). Toronto, Ontario: Canadian Society for the Study of Education: 61–72. doi:10.2307/1494526. ISSN 0380-2361. JSTOR 1494526. OCLC 5544326589.
- Gillett, Margaret (1981). We Walked Very Warily: A History of Women at McGill (1st ed.). Montreal, Quebec: Eden Press Women's Publications. ISBN 978-0-920792-08-7.
- Gillett, Margaret; Sibbald, Kay, eds. (1984). A Fair Shake: Autobiographical Essays by McGill Women (1st ed.). Montreal, Quebec: Eden Press Women's Publications. ISBN 978-0-920792-31-5.
- Gillett, Margaret; Beer, Ann, eds. (1995). Our Own Agendas: Autobiographical Essays by Women Associated with McGill University. Montreal, Quebec: McGill-Queen's University Press. ISBN 978-0-7735-1339-6.
- Gillett, Margaret (2008). "Midwife to the Birth of Women's Studies at McGill". In Robbins, Wendy; Luxton, Meg; Eichler, Margrit; Descarries, Francine (eds.). Minds of Our Own. Waterloo, Ontario: Wilfrid Laurier University Press. pp. 89–94. doi:10.51644/9781554581238. ISBN 978-1-55458-123-8. – via De Gruyter (subscription required)

=== Other ===
- Gillett, Margaret; Kehoe, Monika (1967). The Laurel and the Poppy: A Novel About the Life of Francis Thompson, 1859–1907. New York, New York: Vanguard Press. OCLC 953110.
- Gillett, Margaret (1986). Dear Grace: A Romance of History (1st ed.). Montreal, Quebec: Eden Press Women's Publications. ISBN 978-0-920792-58-2.
- Gillett, Margaret (2000). Traf: A History of Trafalgar School for Girls. Montreal, Quebec: Trafalgar School for Girls. ISBN 978-0-9687815-0-0.
