= Ina Sugihara =

Nisei Activist

- Born: 7 September 1919; Las Animas
- Died: 16 September 2004 (aged 85); White Plains
- Alma mater: California State University, Long Beach; University of California, Berkeley
- Occupation: Activist, secretary (1941–)
- Political party: Socialist Party USA

Ina Sugihara (Japanese: 杉原 イナ, September 7, 1919 – September 16, 2004) was a second-generation Japanese American civil rights activist who co-founded the Congress of Racial Equality's (CORE) New York chapter. She also co-founded the Japanese American Citizens League's (JACL) first multiracial chapter, its New York branch.

== Early life and education ==
Ina Sugihara was born on September 7, 1919 in Las Animas, Colorado. Her parents were William Bonsaku and Takeyo Sugihara, Japanese farmers who had immigrated from Yamanashi in the early 1900s. She spent her early childhood in Colorado, but when the Great Depression forced her parents to quit melon farming in the 1930s, Sugihara moved with her family to Long Beach, California, where her parents ran a produce market.

Sugihara was originally scouted for a scholarship to the University of California, Los Angeles. However, she was rejected because she wanted to be a lawyer, while the interviewer believed that nursing was a "more suitable" career choice for an Asian woman. Sugihara instead attended Long Beach Community College before enrolling at University of California, Berkeley, where her brother James studied. At Berkeley, Sugihara attended the meetings of local organizations Oakland Nisei Democrats and Pacific Coast Labor School. However, she struggled with the school's employment office, which encouraged her to become a maid, while she found jobs for herself as a secretary and writer. After graduation, Sugihara became a secretary for attorney Ernest Besig, director of the Northern California branch of the American Civil Liberties Union.

== Japanese American internment ==
In February 1942, following Japan's attack on Pearl Harbor and subsequent U.S. declaration of war against Japan, President Franklin D. Roosevelt signed Executive Order 9066. The order became grounds for the removal of over 120,000 Japanese Americans from the West Coast to internment camps further inland.

Sugihara received help from Besig and social worker Ruth Kingman to voluntarily migrate to New York, where she attended business school and worked as a secretary for John Thomas of the American Baptist Home Mission Society. This allowed her to avoid internment in the camps. After working for Thomas, Sugihara undertook roles in the publicity offices of the Protestant Welfare Council's Human Relations division and the Federal Council of Churches. During this time, she wrote for the Religious News Service.

Sugihara supported the assimilation of Nisei into American society after the war. In a 1945 article for the Commonweal, she argued that Japanese Americans should not return to the West Coast following internment but should instead disperse across the country to avoid further discrimination.

== Political activism ==
While in New York, Sugihara became involved with the Socialist Party. Within the Party's New York branch, she organized the Minorities Workshop. She also joined the staff of the Party's publication The Call.

Much of Sugihara's activism was rooted in racial justice, with an emphasis on cross-cultural solidarity. In 1943, Sugihara co-founded the Congress of Racial Equality's New York Chapter, which opposed segregation through nonviolent, direct-action protest. She assisted in organizing the Japanese American Citizens League's New York branch, which was JACL's first multiracial chapter. Through the New York JACL, Sugihara supported the re-authorization of the wartime anti-discrimination watchdog agency, the Committee on Fair Employment Practices (FEPC). In 1945, Sugihara published an article in the NAACP's magazine The Crisis, entitled "Our Stake in a Permanent FEPC," which argued that all minority groups stood to benefit from the organization's cause. In the article, Sugihara wrote, "The fate of each minority depends upon the extent of justice given all other groups." She also contributed to early legal arguments against racial discrimination, helping develop the strict scrutiny standard in equal protection law.

In the 1950s, Sugihara was named both JACL national secretary and vice-president of the JACL's Eastern District.

== Personal life ==
In 1955, Sugihara married Willis Jones, an African American man whom she had met during her work with CORE. The backlash they received in response to the marriage led Sugihara to largely withdraw from activism.

In her later years, Sugihara worked for Texaco. In 1977, Sugihara and her husband moved to White Plains. In 1982, Jones died. After retirement, Sugihara became involved with the Westchester Chapter of the Gray Panthers, an activist group opposing ageism. On September 16, 2004, Sugihara passed away.
