= Nichi Bei Times =

Newspaper in San Francisco, California

- Type: Daily, then four times weekly
- Owner(s): Kyutaro Abiko; William Yasuo Abiko
- Founded: 1899
- Ceased publication: September 30, 2009
- Headquarters: San Francisco, California, U.S.
- Circulation: 25,000 (1920s); 8,000 (2009)
- Website: nichibei.org

The Nichi Bei Times (日米タイムズ, Nichi Bei Taimuzu) is a Japanese American news agency operated by the Nichi Bei Foundation and headquartered in San Francisco. As of 2009 it was the oldest Japanese American newspaper in Northern California.

Historically the Nichi Bei Times was a daily bilingual English-Japanese newspaper, while from 2006 to 2009 it was published four times weekly, with Japanese editions on Tuesdays, Thursdays, and Saturdays and English editions on Thursdays. On September 30, 2009, the newspaper stopped publication. Despite the end of the printed newspaper Nichi Bei Foundation continues to publish news digitally on its website.

== History ==
In 1899 Kyutaro Abiko (我孫子 久太郎, Abiko Kyūtarō), a newspaper seller, established the Nichi Bei Shimbun (日米新聞, Nichi Bei Shinbun). The Nichi Bei Foundation said that Kyutaro Abiko was "known to historians as the most influential Japanese immigrant to America," and that the newspaper was "the most influential Japanese American newspaper in the country prior to World War II." The daily circulation peaked at 25,000 during the 1920s, and although it had dropped to 9,400 by 1941 the Nichi Bei remained more or less even with its competitors. After Abiko's death in 1936, his wife Yonako took over the business, and in 1939 the Nichi Bei building and equipment were destroyed in a fire. The company acquired a new location in 1940 but ceased operations less than two years later, when the newspaper was forced to close and the staff sent to World War II internment camps in April 1942.

After World War II several employees of the Nichi Bei Shimbun founded the Nichi Bei Times, with William Yasuo Abiko, the son of Kyutaro and Yonako, heading the new business. The first issue was published on May 18, 1946. The Nichi Bei Times asked for donations to rebuild post-war Japan. Justine Koo Drennan of New America Media said "Since then, the paper has consistently covered hate crimes and other news important to Japanese Americans that the mainstream media has neglected." In 1998 Kenji G. Taguma, who by 2009 was the Nichi Bei Times vice president and editor of the English version, wrote a story that contributed to the gain of redress for families of miners and railroad workers who had been fired from their jobs after the Japanese military had attacked Pearl Harbor in 1941; the U.S. federal government had not included them in a 1988 redress act.

=== Decline and closure ===
In 2006, in order to revive the newspaper's circulation, Taguma reduced subscription prices and rearranged the publishing days. The paper was published in Japanese on Tuesdays, Thursdays, and Saturdays and an English weekly version was published on Thursdays. From 2006 newspaper revenues continued to fall.

In August 2009 the newspaper had a circulation base of 8,000 readers, primarily in Northern California. Around that period the newspaper's lease of its facility was soon to expire. In August 2009 the board of directors of the newspaper voted to close the newspaper, effective September 30, 2009. Ken Abiko, the chairperson of the board and the grandson of Kyutaro Abiko, said that a reduction in advertisements and paper circulation were the primary factors behind the paper's close.

=== Nonprofit founded ===
Around the period of the close of the paper, several employees of the Nichi Bei Times and some community members made plans to establish a nonprofit reincarnation of the newspaper, the Nichi Bei Foundation. Kenji G. Taguma drew up plans for it. Taguma said that he created the plans because, as paraphrased by Justine Koo Drennan of New America Media, "he believes the paper is an essential voice for Japanese Americans." Taguma said "Today, I see the paper as the glue that holds the community together." As of 2016, the newspaper is published weekly.

== See also ==
- Chicago Shimpo
- Hokubei Mainichi Newspaper
- Pacific Citizen
- Rafu Shimpo
