= St. Louis Reparations Commission =

The St. Louis Reparations Commission was created by St. Louis, Missouri Mayor Tishaura O. Jones, the first African-American woman to hold the mayoralty, by Executive Order in December 2022 to develop the city's plan for reparations for slavery.

The Commission consists of nine members, eight of whom are black. All members live in the City of St. Louis, and represent diverse educational and professional backgrounds. The appointments are as follows:

- Will Ross, associate dean for Diversity at Washington University School of Medicine and professor of medicine in the Nephrology Division
- Delesha N. George, program manager at Deaconess Foundation
- Kayla Reed, co-founder and executive director of Action St. Louis
- William Foster, city resident and external audit generalist at PriceWaterHouseCoopers
- Gwen Moore, historian and curator of Urban Landscape and Community Identity
- Kevin Anthony, bridge pastor at Pilgrim Congregational United Church of Christ
- David Cunningham, professor and chair of sociology at Washington University in St. Louis
- Jada Brooks, a Communications student at Harris-Stowe University
- Kimberly Hicks Franks, attorney, activist, and board member of Dutchtown South Community Corporation

== See also ==
- Evanston Reparations Committee
- California Reparations Task Force
