= Japanese American Citizens League =

Asian-American civil rights charity based in San Francisco, California

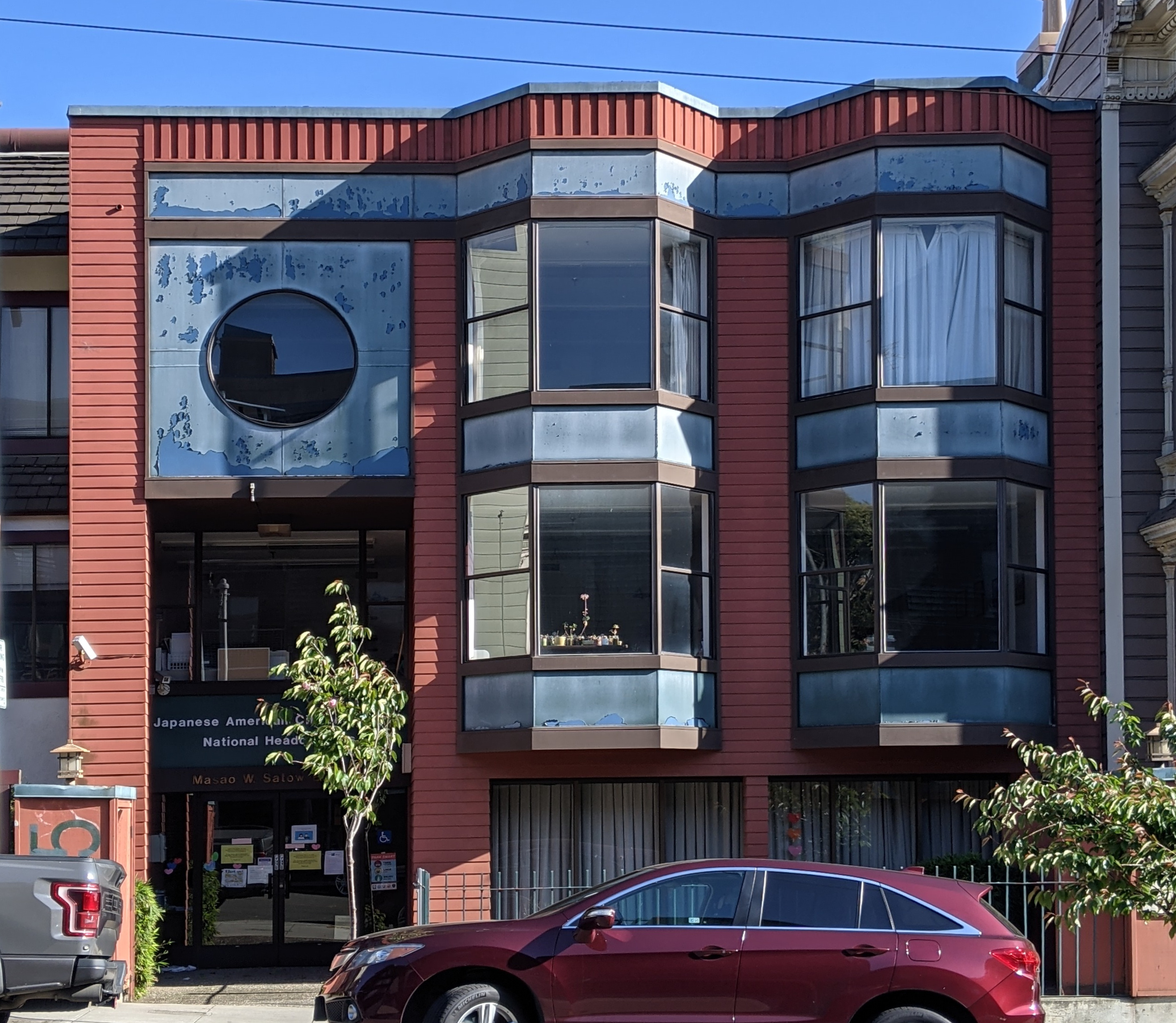
- JACL's San Francisco headquarters in 2021
- Founded: 1929; 97 years ago
- Type: 501(c)(3) charitable organization
- Purpose: Asian American civil rights
- Headquarters: San Francisco, United States
- Location: United States
- Website: jacl.org

The Japanese American Citizens League (日系アメリカ人市民同盟, Nikkei Amerikajin Shimin Dōmei) is an Asian American civil rights charity, headquartered in San Francisco, with regional chapters across the United States.

The Japanese American Citizens League (JACL) describes itself as the oldest and largest Asian American civil rights organization in the United States, focusing on civil and human rights of all Americans, particularly the Asian Pacific American community. The organization was formed in 1929 out of existing Nisei organizations in California and Washington.

In its early years, the JACL lobbied for legislation that expanded the citizenship rights of Japanese Americans, and local chapters organized meetings to encourage Nisei to become more politically active. During and leading up to World War II, the JACL was criticized for its decision not to use its political influence to fight the incarceration of Japanese Americans, aiding U.S. intelligence agencies in identifying "disloyal" Issei, and taking a hardline stance against draft resisters in camp. These issues remain a source of division within the Japanese American community and the organization itself.

After the war, the JACL returned its primary focus to civil rights legislation, lobbying Congress and bringing lawsuits to overturn or amend laws regarding interracial marriage, segregation, and race-based restrictions on immigration and naturalization. In the 1970s, after some initial disagreement among leaders, the organization became involved in the movement for redress for the wartime incarceration. The influence of JACL lobbyists was a key factor in the passage of the Civil Liberties Act of 1988, which formally acknowledged the unconstitutionality of and provided reparations for the incarceration. A younger generation of JACL leadership has made an effort to acknowledge the consequences of its wartime actions, officially apologizing for its condemnation of Nisei draft resisters in 2002.

Today, the national organization consists of 100-plus chapters, mostly located in major cities and metropolitan areas across the US. These chapters are separated geographically into seven district councils, each of which is headed by a district governor. The organization is guided by a board of elected officials, consisting of the officers and district governors.

== History ==
=== Early years (1929–1941) ===
In 1929, several already-established Nisei organizations merged to form the Japanese American Citizens League (JACL), most prominent among them Fresno's American Loyalty League (アメリカ忠誠協会, Amerika Chūsei Kyōkai)(headed by Nisei UC educated dentist Dr. Thomas T. Yatabe, 1897–1977), the Seattle Progressive Citizens League (シアトル革新市民連盟, Siatoru Kakushin Shimin Renmei), and the San Francisco-based New American Citizens League (新アメリカ市民協会, Shin Amerika Shimin Kyōkai) (headed by Nisei UC educated lawyer Saburo Kido, 1902–1977). Aiming towards professionals and small business owners among the Nisei, the JACL sought to promote free enterprise, self-reliance, and loyalty to the United States. The organization thus excluded a hyphen from its name.

Due in part to the active support of James Sakamoto and other Seattle activists, the nascent JACL chose to hold its first national conference in Seattle in 1930. It soon after began work to expand the citizenship rights of Japanese and other Asian Americans, who were considered unassimilable to American society and therefore ineligible for naturalization under the Immigration Act of 1924. Their first target was the Cable Act of 1922, which revoked the citizenship of women who married men ineligible for citizenship, namely Asian immigrants. After a successful lobbying campaign, Congress amended the act in 1931. Next, the JACL began a campaign to allow Issei and other Asian American veterans of the First World War to become U.S. citizens. In 1935, the Nye-Lea Act secured citizenship rights for these men.

The organization started with ten chapters in 1930, two in Washington, one Oregon, the rest in California. But eleven more had been formed by 1932 and in 1935 the JACL claimed 42 chapters, still almost entirely on the west coast but now including small towns and cities in the agricultural valleys, reflecting the mostly rural distribution of the Japanese American population before World War II. By 1940, there were 53 chapters including a few in Idaho, Utah, Colorado, and Arizona. But none in Hawaii.

=== World War II incarceration (1941–1945) ===
In 1941, within hours of the Imperial Japanese Navy's attack on Pearl Harbor, the Federal Bureau of Investigation (FBI) began arresting Japanese American community leaders (mostly Issei Japanese language school teachers, priests, martial arts instructors, and business owners). Members of the JACL testified at government hearings to promote a picture of Nisei as loyal and patriotic Americans, an effort to counteract rumors of fifth column activity that had spread in the wake of Pearl Harbor. At the same time, the JACL aided FBI and Naval Intelligence officials to identify potentially disloyal Issei, a move many Japanese Americans argued tried to buy political safety for a small segment of the community at the expense of its more vulnerable members.

When President Franklin D. Roosevelt signed Executive Order 9066, JACL leadership did not question the constitutionality of the exclusion of Japanese Americans from the West Coast. Instead, arguing it would better serve the community to follow government orders without protest, the organization advised the approximately 120,000 affected to go peacefully and distanced itself from those who actively opposed the order. In an interview after the war, civil rights attorney Wayne M. Collins criticized these actions of the JACL. "The JACL pretended to be the spokesman for all Japanese Americans, but they wouldn't stand up for their people ... They led their people like a bunch of goddam doves to the concentration camps."

Throughout the war, the JACL made efforts to ensure some measure of protection and comfort for Japanese Americans resettling outside government concentration camps, providing loans and establishing offices in Chicago to assist families resettling in the Midwest. The organization argued for the right of Japanese Americans to serve in the U.S. military. In Hawaii, where at that time the JACL did not exist, many community leaders actively supported for men of Japanese descent to serve in the military resulting in the formation of the 100th Infantry Battalion , and the 442nd Regiment Combat Team, when 10,000 signed up with eventually 2,686 being chosen to join the 1,500 from the mainland.

=== Redress (1945–1988) ===
Following the war, the JACL began to rebuild. In 1945, only 23 chapters remained, nearly all located away from the West Coast. In 1946, as internees struggled to return only to find that pre-war Japanese communities were gone and mostly could not be restored, JACL chapters reappeared in the major West Coast cities, totally 39. By 1950, many of the earlier chapters had been reactivated, bring the total to 80. From then until 1970, the list of chapters remained fairly constant, still concentrated in the West, but with important chapters in the big cities of the Midwest and East Coast.

In the late 1940s, the JACL began a long series of legislative efforts to establish rights for Japanese Americans. The JACL embarked on a campaign to repeal California's Alien Land Law, which had prohibited all Japanese aliens (i.e. immigrants) from purchasing and owning land in the state. In 1948, the JACL succeeded in gaining passage of the Evacuation Claims Act, the first of a series of efforts to rectify the losses and injustices of the World War II incarceration. In 1949, the JACL initiated efforts in the U.S. Congress to gain the right of Japanese immigrants to become naturalized citizens of the U.S.

In 1970, the JACL endorsed a resolution, introduced by member Edison Uno, to urge Congress to compensate each camp survivor for each day they had spent in confinement. Later, in 1979, the JACL's National Committee for Redress proposed the creation of a federal commission to investigate the incarceration. The following year, the JACL, with help from Senators Daniel Inouye and Spark Matsunaga, pushed a bill through Congress to create the Commission on Wartime Relocation and Internment of Civilians (CWRIC). In 1983, the CWRIC published its findings and recommended an official Government apology and redress payments to survivors. This was granted with the passage of the Civil Liberties Act of 1988 and signed by President Ronald Reagan.

=== Post-redress (1988–present) ===
In 1994, at its national convention, the JACL passed a resolution affirming its commitment to and support of the basic human right of marriage, including the right to marry for same-sex couples. In 2012, the JACL was the first national civil rights membership organization to publicly and actively adopt this position, and praised President Barack Obama for his support for same-sex marriage.

Since 2022, the JACL has championed the cause of reparations for slavery. In addition to endorsing local proposals for reparations, JACL has demanded the Biden administration begin the process of studying federal reparations for African Americans. JACL representatives testified in favor of the creation of the Philadelphia Reparations Task Force.

== Programs ==
=== Bridging Communities Program ===
The Bridging Communities Program brings youth from the Japanese and Asian American community together with Muslim and Arab American youth. High school students attend workshops on identity, community, organizing, culture, and empowerment. The program involves visits to the Tule Lake Relocation Center, Manzanar, and Minidoka National Historic Site concentration camps, which first confined Japanese Americans during World War II. The Bridging Communities program is funded by a grant from the National Park Service.

Organizational partners include the Council on American-Islamic Relations, the Tule Lake Pilgrimage Committee, the National Japanese American Historical Society, Nikkei for Civil Rights and Redress, Kizuna, and Friends of Minidoka.

=== JACL/OCA Leadership Summit ===
This three-day annual leadership training summit is a joint program organized by the JACL which includes participants from OCA National (formerly the Organization of Chinese Americans). Workshop topics range from coalition building techniques to the strategy of successful lobbying.

=== Youth Leadership Summit ===
The JACL's Youth Leadership Summit was first established in 2010 and has been held annually in Chicago, Portland, and Washington DC.

=== Scholarships ===
The JACL launched a National Scholarship and Awards Program in 1946. It offer scholarships to students at the entering freshman, undergraduate, graduate, law, financial need and creative & performing arts. All scholarships are one-time awards.

=== The League of Dreams ===
JACL National and film producer Lane Nishikawa are working together to create a documentary of the 90 years of history since the foundation of the JACL. Nishikawa intends for the documentary to "chronicle the history of the Japanese American Citizens League (JACL), the oldest and largest Asian American civil rights organization in the U.S." The project has received a grant of $165,000 from the Japanese American Confinement Sites (JACS) and a grant award of $25,000 through the assistance of the San Diego Chapter JACL.

=== Anti-Hate Program ===
JACL's Anti-Hate Program was created in response to the increased rates of Asian American hate crimes and anti-Asian sentiments following COVID-19. The JACL states that they aim to "eradicate the use of negative stereotypes and misperceptions about Asian Americans and Pacific Islanders. To accomplish this, the JACL monitors and combats hate crimes and hate incidents including defamation and racial/ethnic profiling." The site lists resources in response to anti-Asian sentiment and hate crimes, state hate crime laws, and responses to hate.

== National Convention ==
=== History of National Convention ===
The first JACL National Convention was held on August 29, 1930, in Seattle, Washington. The first post World War II National JACL Convention was held in Denver, Colorado. Adoption of a 14-point program of rebuilding which included Issei naturalization, reparations for discriminatory treatment during the war, re-examination of the constitutionality of the evacuation, stay of deportation on hardship cases involving Japanese nationals, a call for a national conference of minorities, elimination of racial discrimination in housing and employment, challenge of the alien land laws, creation of a research clearinghouse on the evacuation, and assistance of returning Nisei veterans.

=== 1970 National Convention ===
The 1970 JACL convention was marred by the murder of Evelyn Okubo, an 18-year-old activist and attendee, by a black man. Nevertheless, the JACL continued its commitment to racial justice for all Americans, including African-Americans.

=== 2013 National Convention ===
The 2013 JACL National Convention was held July 24–26, 2013, in Washington, DC. The theme for the 44th convention was "Justice for All".

== Headquarters, districts and chapters ==
As of 2022, the JACL is headquartered in San Francisco's Japantown neighborhood, directly neighboring the offices of the Japanese American Association of Northern California (Hokka Nichi Bei Kai /北加日米会), which describes itself as the oldest Japanese American Community organization (founded in 1895).

The JACL also maintains an office in Washington DC, and (as of 2022) has over 100 chapters in the US, organized into seven district counciles: Central California District Council, Eastern District Council, Intermountain District Council, Midwest District Council, Northern California-Western Nevada-Pacific District Council, Pacific Northern District Council, and Pacific Southwest District Council.

The JACL did not exist in Hawaii during the years prior to and after World War II; a chapter was finally established in 1980.

== Notable members ==
- Frank Chuman
- Gordon Hirabayashi
- Mike Honda
- Chris Iijima
- Saburo Kido
- Mike Masaoka
- Doris Matsui
- Robert Matsui
- Spark Matsunaga
- Stan Matsunaka
- Norman Mineta
- Evelyn Okubo
- James Y. Sakamoto
- Charles Z. Smith
- Ina Sugihara
- George Takei
- Ruth Nomura Tanbara
- Grayce Uyehara
- George Yuzawa

== See also ==
- Pacific Citizen
- Japanese Americans
- Densho: The Japanese American Legacy Project
- Japanese American Committee for Democracy
- Japanese American National Library
- Japanese American National Museum
  - Japanese American Museum of San Jose
- Japan–United States relations
  - Anti-Japanese sentiment in the United States
  - Consulate-General of Japan, San Francisco
  - U.S.-Japan Council
