= Chicago Futabakai Japanese School =

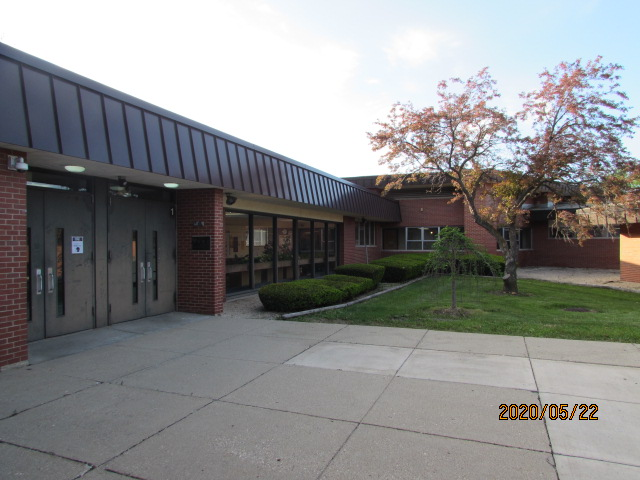

Location
- 2550 N. Arlington Heights Rd. Arlington Heights, Illinois 60004; United States; 42.121423°N 87.981362°W

Information
- School type: Private 1-9
- Grades: 1-9
- Gender: Coed
- Campus type: Suburban
- Website: chicagojs.com

Chicago Futabakai Japanese School (シカゴ双葉会日本語学校, Shikago Futabakai Nihongo Gakkō), alternately in Japanese Shikago Nihonjin Gakkō (シカゴ日本人学校; Chicago Japanese person School), is a Japanese elementary and junior high day school and Saturday education program in Arlington Heights, Illinois. As of 1988 it is sponsored by the Japanese Ministry of Education, now the Ministry of Education, Culture, Sports, Science and Technology (MEXT). Before moving to Arlington Heights in 1998, the Futabakai education program was previously located in Chicago, Skokie, and Niles.

As of 1994, the school is not affiliated with any Japanese school system or university.

== Etymology ==
Futaba (双葉) means "two leaves" and kai (会) means "group" or "organization".

== History ==
The Chicago Futabakai Japanese School Saturday school was first established by the Japanese Chamber of Commerce and Industry of Chicago in May 1966. It opened in a Baptist church in Chicago's North Side with three teachers and 50 students. It was the first Japanese school in the Midwestern United States.

In 1976 Japanese national parents asked the Japanese government to establish a Japanese day school in the area, because they did not want their children to be unprepared for the Japanese educational system. The Saturday school moved to Skokie, Illinois, in May 1978. At that time, the day school opened in Skokie, with four teachers sent by the Japanese government. The day school first opened with 100 students in grades 1 through 7. In 1981 a branch Saturday school for middle and high school students opened at the former Niles East High School in Skokie. In August 1984 the Saturday school and day school moved to Niles, Illinois. In April 1985, due to a lack of space in the Niles school, the Saturday school classes for grades 7 through 12 moved to rented classrooms at Notre Dame High School in Niles. As of 1988 the school was less than half the size of the New York Japanese School, the other U.S. school sponsored by the Japanese ministry of education.

In 1994 the day school had 280 students, with almost all of them being nationals of Japan, and the Saturday school had 850 students. By that year the economic recession in Japan had caused a decline in students. For a twenty-year period the day school operated in obscurity. This ended in 1998 when the day school moved into a new location. The current campus in Arlington Heights opened on Monday April 6, 1998, and classes at that location began on Friday April 10, 1998. During that year its day school had 230 students and its Saturday Japanese language school had 720 students.

On Monday, May 18, 1998, two school officials boarded a helicopter so they could arrange the taking of aerial photographs of the school for a brochure. 49-year-old Shinobu Sada, the vice principal, 38-year-old Kazuya Yamaguchi, an art teacher, 62-year-old Yasuo Sato, a photographer from Wilmette, Illinois, and 40-year-old Scott Maras, a helicopter pilot from Lake Geneva, Wisconsin, died when the helicopter crashed into a house in Arlington Heights.

== Operations ==
The Futabakai operates the day school and the Saturday school, which are private schools registered with the State of Illinois. The parent organization of the Futabakai is the Japanese Chamber of Commerce and Industry. The Ministry of Education, Culture, Sports, Science and Technology provides the guidelines under which the day and Saturday schools are operated. The funding for the day and Saturday schools originates from tuition, support from the Japanese government, and donations from Japanese businesses in the Chicago area. As of 1986 the Japanese government provides faculty, financial assistance to cover building expenses, textbooks, and teaching materials at no additional charge. As of 1992 the Japanese government covers half of the school's operating expenses.

According to Ken Mitani, an administrator at the school, 20% of the school's funding originates from the Ministry of Education of Japan and from the Japanese Chamber of Commerce in Chicago.

As of 1994 there is a requirement that parents of students at the day school be members of the Japanese Chamber of Commerce in Chicago. They may be a part of a corporate membership or be individual members. As of 1994, the yearly tuition was, for students in grades 1–5, $1,620 ($3518.97 when adjusted for inflation), and for students in grades 6–9, $1,740 ($3779.64 when adjusted for inflation). Mitani stated that year that the decline in students could cause fees to increase.

As of 1986, in Japan, the Ministry of Education requires domestic schools to offer a 40-week school year, with six instructional days per week, making a total of 240 instructional days per year. The Japanese school year begins in April, and terminates in March. As of 1998, corresponding to the beginning of the Japanese school year, the Futabakai school year begins in April. Unlike domestic Japanese schools, Futabakai has to schedule separate Saturday schools, so it offers 200 school days per year for day school students. As of 1986, in order to qualify for state aid, Illinois public schools were required to have classes in session for at least 180 days, including teacher institute days. As of 1992 Futabakai has a day school year of around 200 days, while area public school students had a school year of 187 days. Both the Futabakai and American systems had an equal number of hours devoted to educational instruction. Students, as of 1998, have about ten weeks per year where they do not attend school. As of 1986, instead of having one large summer vacation, students have smaller intermittent vacations throughout the school year. As of 1990 holidays include traditional Japanese holidays and a holiday after the end of the school year.

Futabakai operates a Saturday school program for students who attend local American schools. The Saturday program involves the study of the Japanese language and mathematics. The Saturday school, as of 1990, meets 44 times per year, and within its scope, students study many of the same courses that the day students study. In 1990, parents said that this causes the pace of the Saturday program to be more accelerated.

== Campus ==
The day school opened at its current location in 1998. The current campus was the former Rand Middle School building, which closed in 1983.

When the day school opened, it was located in the former Kenton School in Skokie. That location is now used as the Arie Crown Hebrew Day School. In August 1984, the day school moved to the then-former Emerson Middle School in Niles, a two-story schoolhouse rented from the Park Ridge-Niles School District 64. Chicago Futabakai chose this location because it was central to many Japanese families living in the Chicago metropolitan area. While the school was in the Niles campus, all signage at the school was in the Japanese language. The former Niles campus is now used as Emerson Middle School.

== Student body ==
As of 1994 almost all of the students are Japanese nationals. Most of the students of Futabukai reside in the U.S. temporarily while their parents work in the US. As of 1986 the student body for the day program was mainly in an area bounded by Deerfield to the north, the North Side of Chicago to the south, Schaumburg to the west, and Lake Michigan to the east. Some students attended the Saturday school only because they lived too far away to commute every day for school; some Japanese companies required employees to live in company-provided housing in the Chicago Loop. In 1995 most students came from Chicago suburbs in the north and northwest, and some students commuted up to one hour per direction to attend Chicago Futabakai.

In 1986 the Saturday school had 800 children in grades Kindergarten through 12. In 1992 the school had about 280 students in elementary and junior high school. During the same year around 1,000 children attended the Saturday school program. In 1995 the day school had 275 students in grades 1 through 9. While the school was located in Niles, the peak enrollment for the day school was 300, and the peak enrollment for the Saturday school was 1,000. In 1998, 230 students attended the day classes and about 730 attended the Saturday classes.

In 1995 Tsuneo Akasaka, the principal, said that it was common for a Japanese national student to transfer to Chicago Futabakai from a public school in preparation for eventually returning to Japan, while it is not common for a student to transfer from Futabakai to a public school. Akasaka added that if a student was going to an American high school instead of going to high school in Japan, then a student typically would transfer to a public school.

== Faculty ==
As of 1986 the Japanese government assigns teachers for the day and Saturday program in three year shifts. In 1986 the day school had 21 full-time teachers and 2 part-time teachers. Of all of the teachers, the Japanese government had sent 14 of them. Of the 32 teachers of the Saturday school, the Japanese government sent 2. In 1992 the Japanese government sent 16 teachers to Chicago Futabakai. In 1995 the day school had 28 teachers, with 16 teachers from Japan and 12 local teachers. Some of the local teachers were English teachers who did not know how to speak Japanese.

== Day school curriculum ==
As of 1998, American social studies and English as a foreign language are taught in English, but all other classes are taught in Japanese. As of 1992, in order to be admitted, the student has to be able to understand Japanese.

As of 1992 the students take calligraphy classes. As of 1995 students tend to learn at a quicker pace than at American schools. For instance, in 1995 first graders at Futabakai learned addition, subtraction, and numbers up to 200. During the same year American first graders typically learned numbers up to 100. Takanori Tajima, a first grade teacher, said that in all subjects the acts of learning and playing are combined. As of 1990 students are required to take music and physical education classes. As of the same year, because the students have so many required classes, the school does not offer electives.

== See also ==
- Japanese in Chicago
- Chicago Shimpo
- American School in Japan, American international school in Tokyo
- Japanese language education in the United States
