= Hokubei Mainichi Newspaper =

Newspaper in San Francisco, California

- Type: Daily newspaper (not Mondays or Sundays)
- Publisher: Hokubei Mainichi
- Founded: February 18, 1948
- Ceased publication: December 2009
- Language: Japanese and English
- Circulation: 7,500
- OCLC number: 4601734
- Website: https://web.archive.org/*/http://www.hokubei.com/

Hokubei Mainichi Newspaper, more usually known as Hokubei Mainichi (北米毎日, "North America Daily"), was a Japanese language newspaper published from 1948 to 2009. It was Northern California’s only Japanese American bilingual newspaper after the closure of the Nichi Bei Times on September 10, 2009. It was published by Hokubei Mainichi, Inc. (北米毎日新聞社, Hokubei Mainichi Shinbun Sha), headquartered in San Francisco.

== History ==
The first edition of the Hokubei Mainichi Newspaper appeared on February 18, 1948, and one of the founders was Ryotei Matsukage, a former head of the Buddhist Churches of America. It started at 1737 Sutter St. in San Francisco as a Buddhist alternative to the Nichi Bei Times, which was regarded as being Christian. It was, however, non-religious by 2003. In 1977, the newspaper moved from the Sutter St. building to the corner of Post and Webster streets. In about 1991, the newspaper changed from typesetting to the use of computers. The Post St. building was sold in 2007 to Viz Media, and the newspaper moved to 1710 Octavia St. In July 2009, it changed from publishing five times a week to four times a week. On October 27, 2009, it was announced that the final edition would be on October 30, 2009. The newspaper had a circulation of ca. 7,500.

It was bilingual Japanese and English throughout its existence.

== Circulation ==
The newspaper was distributed mainly by subscription and only to a limited extent from newsstands. Its main readership was in San Francisco County and Santa Clara County.

== See also ==
- Chicago Shimpo
- Nichi Bei Times
- Pacific Citizen
- Rafu Shimpo
