= Canadian Federation of Jewish Students =

The Canadian Federation of Jewish Students (CFJS) or Federation Canadienne Des Etudiants Juifs (FCEJ), in French, was the representative organization of Jewish students across Canada. It was founded by leaders of Jewish student groups across the country in January 2004 in Ottawa, and "became defunct in 2011". After its dissolution, national Jewish student representation in Canada was taken over by Hillel Canada / CIJA.

The CFJS Executive was made up of an elected president and four vice-presidents as well as several committee chairs and "members-at-large" chosen by the elected executive. CFJS was governed in part by a Congress, with representatives chosen by Jewish students at each university.

== History ==
The Canadian Federation of Jewish Students was founded by the leaders of Jewish student groups across the country in January 2004 and existed to empower the Canadian Jewish student community. It held an annual conference of Canadian Jewish leadership (Hillel and Jewish Students Association (JSA) presidents, Israel advocates, Alpha Epsilon Pi fraternity leaders, et cetera). In the early years of CFJS, this conference was held at a camp in Parry Sound, Ontario. In its later years, the conference was moved to Guelph, Ontario.

In September 2008, CFJS partnered with several other Jewish organization to send approximately 300 students to New York to protest "incitement to genocide" by Iranian president Mahmoud Ahmadinejad, who was speaking that week at the United Nations.

In the spring of 2009, CFJS assembled its congress - representatives of the major Jewish organizations from each Canadian campus - in Toronto, for leadership development, and elections of the CFJS executive. Speakers at the Congress included Jason Kenney, Canada's Minister of Citizenship, Immigration and Multiculturalism.

In early 2010, CFJS launched Milim, a publication about Canadian Jewish student art and literature.

== Principles ==
The organization's activities were based on five principles about representation, convening and uniting, leadership development, Canadian Jewish identity development and communication.

CFJS aimed to represent Jewish students and their concerns and interests to outside organizations, including but not limited to national Jewish and student organizations as well as international Jewish student organizations and in the news media. They did this through the support of local campus-based Jewish student groups.

CFJS had representation on the following bodies:

- The Canadian Council for Jewish and Israel Advocacy
- National Jewish Campus Life
- Canada-Israel Committee
- UIA Federations Canada
- Hillel International
- World Union of Jewish Students
