= Mike Masaoka =

American activist, lobbyist, author, and spokesman

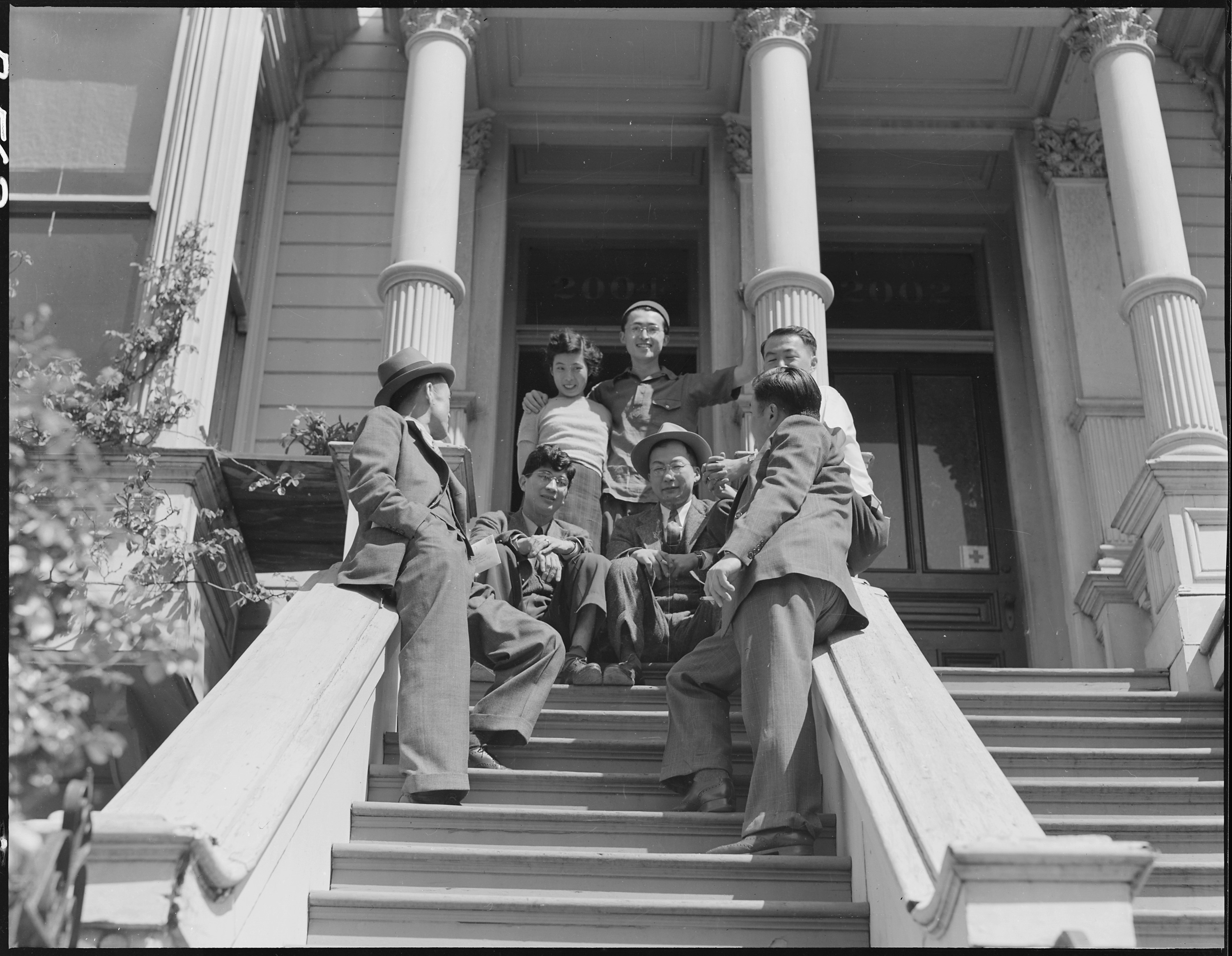
- Masaoka (second from left), national secretary and field executive for the Japanese American Citizens League, with friends in San Francisco (April 1942)
- Born: October 15, 1915; Fresno, California, U.S.
- Died: June 26, 1991 (aged 75); Washington, D.C., U.S.
- Education: University of Utah
- Awards: Order of the Rising Sun

Mike Masaru Masaoka (Japanese: 正岡 勝, October 15, 1915 – June 26, 1991) was a Japanese-American lobbyist, author, and spokesman. He worked with the Japanese American Citizens League for over 30 years. He was a key player in encouraging cooperation of the JACL with Japanese American internment during World War II, but also fought for rights of Japanese-Americans during and after the war.

== Early life ==
Mike Masaoka was born as "Masaru Masaoka" in Fresno, California on October 15, 1915 as the fourth of eight children. His parents were first-generation Japanese Americans (Issei). When Masaoka was young, his family moved to Salt Lake City, where he legally changed his first name to "Mike" and became a member of the Church of Jesus Christ of Latter-day Saints.

Masaoka attended the University of Utah, where he received a degree in economics and political science in 1937.

== Japanese American Citizens League ==
A year after graduating from college, Masaoka attended a Japanese American Citizens League (JACL) meeting, which is when he first felt compelled to get involved in representing and advocating for the Japanese American community.

Masaoka rapidly ascended the JACL's leadership hierarchy. In 1941, he became national secretary, a role in which he continuously served from 1941 to 1943 and then again from 1945 to 1946. He also worked as a field executive during this same period. During Fair Employment Practice Committee (FEPC) hearings held in October 1941, Masaoka testified on employment discrimination faced by Japanese Americans in the defense industry, leading to pledges from various organizations to eliminate anti-Japanese bias.

Masaoka was one of the primary drivers of the JACL's policy of cooperation with the Japanese American internment plan during the war, believing that resistance would be counterproductive and increase the tension between the Nisei and the FDR Administration. He worked with the U.S. government's War Relocation Authority to develop camp policies and pushed back against legal attempts to oppose the government's internment policy. He also advocated for "problematic" internees to be separated from the rest of the people in the camps so that they would not stir up trouble among the masses, though the War Relocation Authority cast the net more broadly than Masaoka had anticipated. While Masaoka was never actually interned in a camp, the U.S. government looked to him as their primary spokesman with respect to communicating with the interned Japanese American population. As a result of his stance, Masaoka was widely denounced within the Japanese American community as a sellout and collaborator.

During World War II, Masaoka went to Washington, D.C. on behalf of the JACL to petition the Roosevelt administration, Congress, and the military leadership to include the Nisei in the military draft. He believed that participation in the U.S. Armed Forces would enable the Nisei to demonstrate their allegiance to America. The events, which eventually convinced the War Department and President Franklin Roosevelt to create the segregated 442nd RCT included lobbying from significant supporters of the Japanese American community, the sterling training record of the 100th as well as the well-publicized efforts of the Varsity Victory Volunteers in Hawai'i for their year of service as volunteer labor for the U.S. Army. Masaoka’s advocacy efforts were part of the lobbying efforts for the formation of the all-Nisei 442nd Regimental Combat Team. Masaoka volunteered for the 442nd, along with four of his brothers. He also worked as the unit's publicist so that the contributions (and heavy price paid) of the Japanese Americans would be known nationwide. For his actions during the war, he was awarded the Bronze Star, the Legion of Merit, and the Italian Cross for Military Valor.

In the aftermath of World War II, Masaoka dedicated himself full time to lobbying on behalf of the JACL in Washington, D.C. He effectively pushed for the repeal of the Immigration Act of 1924, as well as for reparations for Japanese Americans who had been held in internment camps during the war. He also argued for halting deportations to Japan. His lobbying on behalf of the JACL helped pave the way for passage of the Japanese-American Claims Act of 1948. Masaoka was known for being an aggressive lobbyist. Once when he tried to get an audience with Congressman John M. Robsion Jr., Masaoka followed him into the men's room and kept talking to Robison as the representative urinated until he agreed to meet with Masaoka.

Between 1946 and 1952, Masaoka held the position of national legislative director of the JACL Anti-Discrimination Committee. In this role, he successfully petitioned Congress for Issei citizenship rights in 1950. That same year, Masaoka participated in founding the Leadership Council on Civil Rights as a representative of the JACL. Masaoka lobbied for the JACL until 1972, working on issues related to immigration and naturalization laws, as well as civil rights. During this period, Masaoka partnered with Latino community organizations in his civil rights advocacy and joined Martin Luther King Jr.'s August 1963 March on Washington for Jobs and Freedom.

== Achievements and later career ==
Masaoka served as technical consultant for the 1951 film Go For Broke!, which not only portrayed the heroics of the 442nd RCT and 100th Battalion, but also starred several veterans of the 442nd.

In 1952, he worked with the ACLU to bring a case in his mother's name, Masaoka vs. the State of California, to the California State Supreme Court that was one of the two cases that overturned the Alien Land Law (Masaoka v. People, 39 Cal.2d 883).

Masaoka was awarded the Third Class Order of the Rising Sun by the Japanese government on October 31, 1958 as part of the Meiji Centennial celebrations. This was allegedly the highest honor bestowed on any American-born Japanese, and Masaoka was the youngest person to ever receive the medal. It has been suggested that Masaoka was granted the award because of the JACL’s expressed support for Japanese Prime Minister Sato’s position with respect to the reversion of the island of Okinawa to Japanese control.

After leaving the JACL, Masaoka established his own lobbying firm in 1972. Known as Mike Masaoka Associates, the firm's focus was on advocating for Japanese American, American, and Japanese business interests. Additionally, Congress selected him to serve as a member of the Commission on Wartime Relocation and Internment of Civilians (CWRIC) in 1980, which dealt with the question of reparations for survivors of the World War II internment camps.

Masaoka coauthored his autobiography, They Call Me Moses Masaoka, with Bill Hosokawa, and it was released in 1987. Associates considered the title a sign of his ego, though the title was originally bestowed derisively by political opponents during the 1940s. Masaoka noted with ironic humor that, unlike Moses, he led his people on a journey from the promised land of California to desert internment camps.

== Personal life and death ==
Masaoka was married to Etsu Mineta Masaoka, the elder sister of Secretary of Transportation and Congressman Norman Mineta.

On June 26, 1991, Masaoka died as a result of heart problems in Washington, D.C.
