= Oyama v. California =

- Supreme Court of the United States

Argued October 22, 1947 Decided January 19, 1948
- Full case name: Fred Oyama, et al. v. California
- Citations: 332 U.S. 633 (more) 68 S. Ct. 269; 92 L. Ed. 249; 1948 U.S. LEXIS 2773

Case history
- Prior: Judgment for the State, San Diego County Superior Court; affirmed, 173 P.2d 794 (Cal. 1946); rehearing denied, Cal. November 25, 1946; cert. granted, 330 U.S. 818 (1947).

Holding
- The application of the California Alien Land Law to a minor citizen whose Japanese father purchased land in his name violated the Equal Protection Clause of the Fourteenth Amendment because the burden for the minor to prove his father did not act with an intent to evade alien land ownership prohibitions discriminated against his right to own property based on the national origin of his father. California Supreme Court reversed.

Court membership
- Chief Justice Fred M. Vinson Associate Justices Hugo Black · Stanley F. Reed; Felix Frankfurter · William O. Douglas; Frank Murphy · Robert H. Jackson; Wiley B. Rutledge · Harold H. Burton

Case opinions
- Majority: Vinson, joined by Black, Frankfurter, Douglas, Murphy, Rutledge
- Concurrence: Black, joined by Douglas
- Concurrence: Murphy, joined by Rutledge
- Dissent: Reed, joined by Burton
- Dissent: Jackson

Laws applied
- U.S. Const. amend. XIV; California Alien Land Law of 1913, 1920

Oyama v. State of California, 332 U.S. 633 (1948) was a United States Supreme Court decision that ruled that specific provisions of the 1913 and 1920 California Alien Land Laws abridged the rights and privileges guaranteed by the Fourteenth Amendment to Fred Oyama, a U.S. citizen in whose name his father, a Japanese citizen, had purchased land. In doing so, however, the court did not overturn the California Alien Land Laws as unconstitutional.

== Background ==
=== California Alien Land Laws ===
The case of Oyama v. California developed from the 1913 and 1920 Alien Land Laws passed in California. In accordance with those laws, persons ineligible to become citizens of the United States were prohibited from owning land. Land control laws were used in the United States in the 19th century and can, in fact, be traced back to English common law.

The California Alien Land Law of 1913 did not employ any specific language targeting Japanese residents in America, but they were the primary target. This was in part to appease the nervous California farmers, who feared that the Japanese immigrants' agricultural techniques, which developed out of the necessity to make as much use of small plots of land as possible, would render them unable to compete economically. The implicit intent of the law was not lost on the Japanese; many Japanese-American residents and even the Japanese government voiced their opposition.

Japanese residents living in America sought various ways to circumvent the alien land laws. A commonly used way to get around it was to purchase land in the name of their US-born children (who, by birth, were automatically granted American citizenship) and then to become the guardian of the property. That enabled Japanese parents to become de facto, if not de jure, managers and owners of land.

In response to those tactics, the 1920 version of the California Alien Land Law included more stringent rules designed to end such circumvention. Among other changes, it introduced a provision that would prove to be crucial in the Oyama case by stating that if a person purchased land in another person's name, it would be presumed that to have been done with the intent to bypass the Alien Land Law. That was a significant shift in the rules regarding burden of proof in state escheat cases involving land. The state used to be required to prove its case, the defendant now had to prove that the purchased land was a bona fide gift, rather than an attempt at getting around the land ownership restrictions.

Another, even more stringent, provision introduced in the 1920 law prohibited assigning persons ineligible for naturalization as guardians of an estate. The California Supreme Court, however, invalidated that prohibition in the 1922 Yano case (Estate of Tetsubmi Yano, 188 Cal. 645).

=== Oyama's land purchase and internment ===
World War II tensions contributed significantly to the development of those issues, as anti-Japanese sentiments grew more heated and the internment of Japanese persons took place. California tightened its Alien Land Laws even further and actively began pursuing escheat procedures. Kajiro Oyama, a Japanese citizen, was one of the individuals thus targeted.

In the case of Oyama, Kajiro Oyama, a Japanese citizen ineligible for naturalization, purchased six acres (24,000 m^{2}) of land in 1934 in Chula Vista, California, in the old Rancho de la Nación land grant. He paid $4,000 for the land (equivalent to $96,000 in 2025), and the seller executed a deed to Fred Oyama, Kajiro's son (who was six years old at this time). Six months later, Kajiro petitioned the Superior Court of San Diego County to be appointed Fred's guardian, stating that Fred owned the six acres (24,000 m^{2}). The court permitted that. The land parcel was expanded by an adjoining two acres (8,100 m^{2}) in 1937.

While the 1920 Alien Land Law required all guardians of property belonging to minor children of ineligible aliens file an annual report to the state, Kajiro Oyama did not do so until the date of the trial.

In 1942, Fred and his family were displaced along with all other Japanese persons in the area. In 1944, the State of California filed a petition to declare an escheat of the eight acres (32,000 m^{2}) of land on the ground that the purchases made in 1934 and 1937 had been made with intent to violate and evade the Alien Land Law.

=== State court proceedings ===
The trial court found that Kajiro Oyama, the father, had enjoyed the beneficial use of the land and that the 1934 and 1937 land transfers had been subterfuges done with intent to avoid the escheat procedure. The court ruled in favor of the state, stating that pursuant to the Alien Land Law, the parcels had vested in the state as of the date of illicit transfers in 1934 and 1937.

The Supreme Court of California upheld the trial court's finding as justified by the evidence. It further ruled that California was permitted to exclude ineligible aliens from purchasing, transferring, and owning agricultural land and that Fred Oyama was deprived of no constitutional guarantees.

== Decision ==
After the case was decided in a trial court and was appealed to and upheld by the California Supreme Court, it went to the U.S. Supreme Court via a writ of certiorari. Dean Acheson, the Secretary of State under U.S. President Harry Truman, presented the case for petitioners.

The petitioners of the case listed three grievances of the Alien Land Law, as it was applied in this case:

- Firstly, it deprived Fred Oyama of the equal protection of the laws and of his privileges as an American citizen.
- Secondly, that it denied Kajiro Oyama equal protection of the laws.
- Thirdly, it contravened the due process clause by sanctioning a taking of property after expiration of the appropriate limitations period.

The Court agreed 8–1 with the petitioner's first contention: the Alien Land Law, as applied in this case, indeed deprived Fred Oyama of the equal protection of California's laws and of his privileges as an American citizen. Because that decision alone was grounds for reversal of the California Supreme Court decision, the Court saw no need to address the second and the third contentions, which consequently left the laws in effect.

=== Vinson's majority opinion ===
Oyama is notable for the significant differences in rendered concurrent opinions. Chief Justice Vinson, delivering the opinion of the Court, wrote strictly on the facts of the case, without giving much note to its broader implications. While freely admitting that it is apparent that the enforcement of the Alien Land Laws in that case resulted in abridgement of equal protection afforded to Fred Oyama by his status as an American citizen, the Supreme Court's opinion rendered by Vinson did not go so far as to rule on or, in fact, even address the constitutionality of the statute.

Firstly, Chief Justice Vinson was fairly conservative in issues of race. As the famous story goes, Associate Justice Frankfurter remarked that Chief Justice Vinson's death in 1953 (that is, in the middle of the Brown v. Board of Education case) was perhaps the only evidence of the existence of God he has ever witnessed. While there are of course no certainties in law, the general consensus remains that if Vinson had not been replaced by Chief Justice Earl Warren in 1953, the landmark Brown v. Board of Education case would have been decided differently.^{1}

Secondly, in the 1920s, the Supreme Court upheld the constitutionality and validity of several land laws. Invalidating the California Alien Land Law would have required overturning the precedents of those decisions, something that the Court is typically loath to do, especially so shortly after the earlier cases. In this case, the Court was able to address the unfairness of the application of the law by focusing on the petitioners first contention and effectively ignore the broader implications.

=== Black's concurrence ===
Associate Justice Hugo Black wrote a brief yet notable opinion, with Justice William Douglas joining, in which he noted that while he concurred with the Court's judgment and opinion, he would prefer to reverse the previous judgment on broader grounds. In his view, the "basic provisions of the California Alien Land Law violate the equal protection clause of the Fourteenth Amendment and conflict with federal laws and treaties governing the immigration of aliens and their rights after arrival in this country."^{2}

He noted further that though the statute did not specifically refer to Japanese residents and though its terms also apply to a small number of aliens from other countries, the effect of the law was to discriminate against Japanese. He stated that if there is only one purpose of the Fourteenth Amendment of which there can be no doubt, it is that it was designed to prevent states from denying some groups because of their race or color any right, privileges, and opportunities that are enjoyed by other groups. Disagreeing with Chief Justice Vinson, Justice Black wrote specifically that he "would now overrule the previous decisions of this Court that sustained state land laws which discriminate against people of Japanese origin residing in this country."^{3}

=== Murphy's concurrence ===
Associate Justice Frank Murphy, with whom Justice Rutledge concurred, delivered the most impassioned opinion. He opens by asking whether the California Alien Land Law was consistent with the U.S. Constitution, whether a state can prohibit aliens from acquiring land, and whether such prohibition is permitted by the Fourteenth Amendment. Justice Murphy answers that the "negative answer to those queries is dictated by the uncompromising opposition of the Constitution to racism, whatever cloak or disguise it may assume." He called the California Alien Land Law "nothing more than an outright racial discrimination" that "deserves constitutional condemnation."

In addition to applying the Equal Protection analysis of the majority, Justice Murphy also invoked the U.S. ratification of the United Nations Charter as an alternative basis for the statutes' unconstitutionality:

Moreover, this nation has recently pledged itself, through the United Nations Charter, to promote respect for, and observance of, human rights and fundamental freedoms for all without distinction as to race, sex, language and religion. The Alien Law stands as a barrier to the fulfillment of that national pledge. Its inconsistency with the Charter, which has been duly ratified and adopted by the United States, is but one more reason why the statute must be condemned.

=== Reed's dissent ===
Associate Justice Reed, joined by Associate Justice Burton, dissented from the Court's decision. Justice Reed stated that he disagreed with the Court's opinion that the Alien Land Laws of California discriminated against Fred Oyama, an American citizen.

=== Jackson's dissent ===
Associate Justice Jackson wrote in his dissenting opinion that since the Court upheld the Alien Land Law, it could not logically set aside the judgment that resulted from its valid enforcement. He noted further that since California was accepted to be allowed to forbid certain aliens from owning land, the state should also be accepted to be empowered to modify its laws to preclude individuals from circumventing the relevant statutes.

== Subsequent jurisprudence ==
Although the Oyama case did not strike down the 1913 and 1920 California Alien Land Laws, it nonetheless proved to be an important precedent. In part relying on the Oyama decision, the California Supreme Court found the Alien Land Laws unconstitutional in Sei Fujii v. California, 38 Cal.2d 718, 242 P.2d 617 (1952), and California finally repealed them in 1956.

== See also ==
- Equal Protection Clause
- Privileges or Immunities Clause
- Korematsu v. United States
- List of United States Supreme Court cases, volume 332

== Notes ==
- ^1 See, for example, Laurence H. Tribe, God Save This Honorable Court: How the Choice of Supreme Court Justices Shapes our History (1985), pp. 37–38: "...most observers believe that Chief Justice Fred Vinson was ambivalent about the constitutionality of school segregation, and uncertain about what position he would take after hearing arguments in a series of cases in 1953."
- ^2 The "federal laws and treaties" that Associate Justice Hugo Black cites in his opinion refer primarily to the Japanese-American Treaty of 1911, which authorized Japanese in this country to lease and occupy land for residential and commercial purposes. However, because the treaty made no mention of agricultural land, the California Alien Land Law - which regulated only agricultural land - did not ostensibly present an obvious conflict.
- ^3 There have been several cases before the Supreme Court in which a seemingly non-discriminatory statute was alleged to have been enforced in a discriminatory manner. One of the earliest, and more famous examples of such a case is Yick Wo v. Hopkins (1886). In its decision, the Court ruled unanimously that the regulation in question was used primarily to target Chinese laundry owners while excluding non-Chinese laundry operators, and as such, was wholly inconsistent with the protections afforded to all residents by the Fourteenth Amendment.
