= Pacific Citizen =

- Type: Bi-monthly newspaper
- Publisher: Japanese American Citizens League
- Founded: 1929
- Language: English
- Headquarters: 123 Astronaut Ellison S. Onizuka St., #206
- City: Los Angeles, California
- Country: United States
- Circulation: 30,000
- Website: PacificCitizen.org
- Free online archives: Digital Archives at PacificCitizen.org

The Pacific Citizen (P.C.) is a national semi-monthly newspaper based in Los Angeles, California, United States focused on covering Asian Pacific American (APA) news. It was founded in 1929 and is published by the Japanese American Citizens League (JACL), the nation’s oldest and largest APA civil rights organization.

== World War II coverage ==
Founded over 90 years ago, the P.C. was initially called Nikkei Shimin (日系市民, Nikkei Shimin), meaning Japanese American Citizen. The publication was based in San Francisco, California.

The publication’s name was officially changed to Pacific Citizen in 1931, chosen in a national contest. When World War II broke out, 120,000 Japanese Americans were interned. To keep the publication running smoothly, the newspaper was moved to Salt Lake City, Utah. In Utah, editor Guyo Tajiri and Larry Tajiri were hired to run the then-weekly newspaper.

Coverage during World War II included the chronicling of everyday life at the camps and the heroism of the Nisei (second generation Japanese American) soldiers. The Friends of the American Way nominated the P.C. for a Pulitzer Prize in 1946 for its journalism coverage. At war’s end in the early 1950s the P.C. returned to the West Coast to Los Angeles, California. On September 27, 1952 Larry Tajiri put together his last P.C. newspaper as editor.

== Redress coverage ==
Former Shin Nichibei staffer Harry K. Honda became editor when the newspaper moved to Los Angeles. Since its inception, the P.C. has been the meeting place for many well-known Japanese American journalists and community leaders like Bill Hosokawa, Togo Tanaka, Mike Masaoka, Bill Marutani and Saburo Kido.

The P.C. also covered the Redress Movement, which sought to give reparations to Japanese Americans, who were interned during World War II. The P.C. was there in the room, and mentioned in President Ronald Reagan speech as he signed the Civil Liberties Act of 1988 granting Japanese Americans who were affected by the World War II internment an official apology letter and monetary compensation.

== Today’s coverage ==
Today, the P.C. covers national news affecting the Asian Pacific American community. Coverage in the past years included exclusive interviews with 1st Lt. Ehren Watada, who in June 2006, refused to deploy to Iraq for his unit's assigned rotation to Operation Iraqi Freedom citing the legality of the war. The newspaper has also focused on civil rights issues, including same-sex marriages in California and beyond. The P.C. Web site has generated over 450,000 hits per month since its launch in 2005. The P.C.’s Web site provides exclusive content and articles that are not found in the print edition.

Currently, P.C. subscribers and JACL members receive the paper via the U.S. Post Office or email. Archived issues can be found on PacificCitizen.org. In 2005, then executive editor, Caroline Aoyagi-Stom won the New America Media Awards along with, then assistant editor Lynda Lin, who also won the New America Media first place award in arts, sports and entertainment reporting in 2009.

The P.C. and its parent, Japanese American Citizens League (J.A.C.L.), will celebrate its 100th anniversary in 2029.
