= Nishiyamato Academy of California =

Coordinates: 33.8049679°N 118.32712549999997°W

- 西大和学園カリフォルニア校

Location
- 2458 Lomita Blvd. Lomita, California; United States

Information
- Type: Private, international, day
- Motto: 探究・誠実・気迫 (Research, Sincerity, Willpower)
- Established: July 22, 1992
- Founder: Ryotaro Tanose
- Sister school: Nishiyamato Gakuen Junior High School and High School
- Head of school: Katsuyuki Nishikawa
- Grades: Pre-K to 9
- Gender: Coeducational
- Enrollment: Approximately 150 total
- Language: English and Japanese
- Campus type: Urban
- Color
- Tuition: $6,020-$9,080 Kindergarten $9,930-$11,890 Elementary $11,610-$11,890 Middle
- Website: www.nacus.org/english/

Nishiyamato Academy of California (西大和学園カリフォルニア校, Nishiyamato gakuen kariforunia kō; NAC) is a private Japanese international day school for students from pre-kindergarten through 9th grade, offering a Japanese guideline-based curriculum. The co-educational academy consists of a kindergarten, an elementary school division, and a middle school division with approximately 150 students, all located in Lomita, California, in the Los Angeles metropolitan area. Since March 1996, the academy has been authorized by Japanese Ministry of Education and its successor Ministry of Education, Culture, Sports, Science and Technology (MEXT) as a Private Overseas Educational Facility (私立在外教育施設, Shiritsu zaigai kyōiku shisetsu).

Nishiyamato Academy offers its own Saturday school program, the Nishiyamato Academy Saturday School (西大和学園補習校 Nishiyamato gakuen hoshūkō) for the children of Japanese expatriates, who are enrolled in local primary or secondary day schools in Los Angeles metropolitan area.

== History ==
Nishiyamato Academy of California was established on July 22, 1992, by Ryotaro Tanose, former chairperson of the board of trustees for Nishiyamato Gakuen, a Japanese school corporation, and former member of Japanese Diet from Nara Prefecture. With 38 students in grades six through eight for the first fiscal year, the school opened at the former Dapplegray Elementary School in Rolling Hills Estates on April 10, 1993.

In 1994, Palos Verdes Peninsula Unified School District (PVPUSD) leased a set of classrooms at Dapplegray to Nishiyamato, on the condition that the school does not enroll over 30 students from that district's boundaries. PVPUSD wanted to ensure Nishiyamato did not remove too many students from its own student body and therefore the income the district obtained from the enrollment of said students. The classrooms obtained that time for Nishiyamato's use, numbering 10, was virtually the remaining lease-able area in Dapplegray.

In September 2000, the school relocated to the current campus in Lomita.

In 2017 the school established a 2,500-square-foot (230 m^{2}) cultural center with computer labs, a stage that can move, and a library with a capacity of 5,000 books. The total cost was $500,000.

== Academics ==
=== Curriculum ===
NAC offers MEXT Curriculum Guideline-based curriculum mainly for the children of Japanese expatriates living in Los Angeles metropolitan area. Classes are held from Monday to Friday, with the first period of the day beginning at 8:30 AM and the last period ending at 3 PM for the kindergarten, 3:15 PM / 4:15 PM / 5 PM for the elementary school, and 4:20 PM / 6:10 PM for the middle school. Although subjects are instructed mainly in Japanese, Art / Visual Art, Home Economics, Technology, and ELA / ELD have been instructed in English as language immersion since the curriculum reform of recent years.

=== Extracurricular activities ===
Nishiyamato Academy of California offers limited extracurricular activities due to normalized supplementary classes after the last period, and only club activities called Special Activities (特別活動, tokubetsu katsudō) are exercised once a week or two weeks.

== See also ==
- History of the Japanese in Los Angeles
- Asahi Gakuen - Japanese weekend school system in the Los Angeles area
- International Bilingual School - Defunct Japanese day school in the Los Angeles area
- Japanese language education in the United States
- American School in Japan, American international school in Tokyo
