= History of the Japanese in Los Angeles =

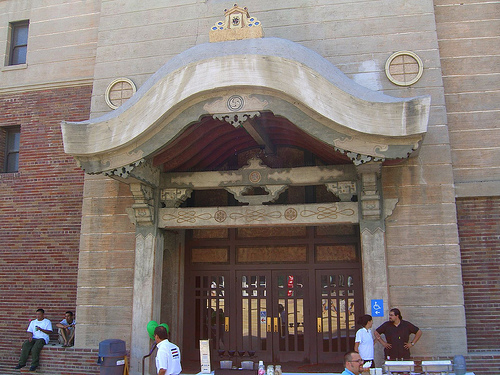
The original Hompa Hongwanji Buddhist temple in Little Tokyo, Los Angeles

There is a Japanese American and a Japanese national population in Los Angeles and Greater Los Angeles. Japanese people began arriving in the United States in the late 1800s and have settled in places like Hawaii, Alaska, and California. Los Angeles has become a hub for people of Japanese descent for generations in areas like Little Tokyo and Boyle Heights. As of 2017, Los Angeles has a Japanese and Japanese American population of around 110,000 people.

== History ==
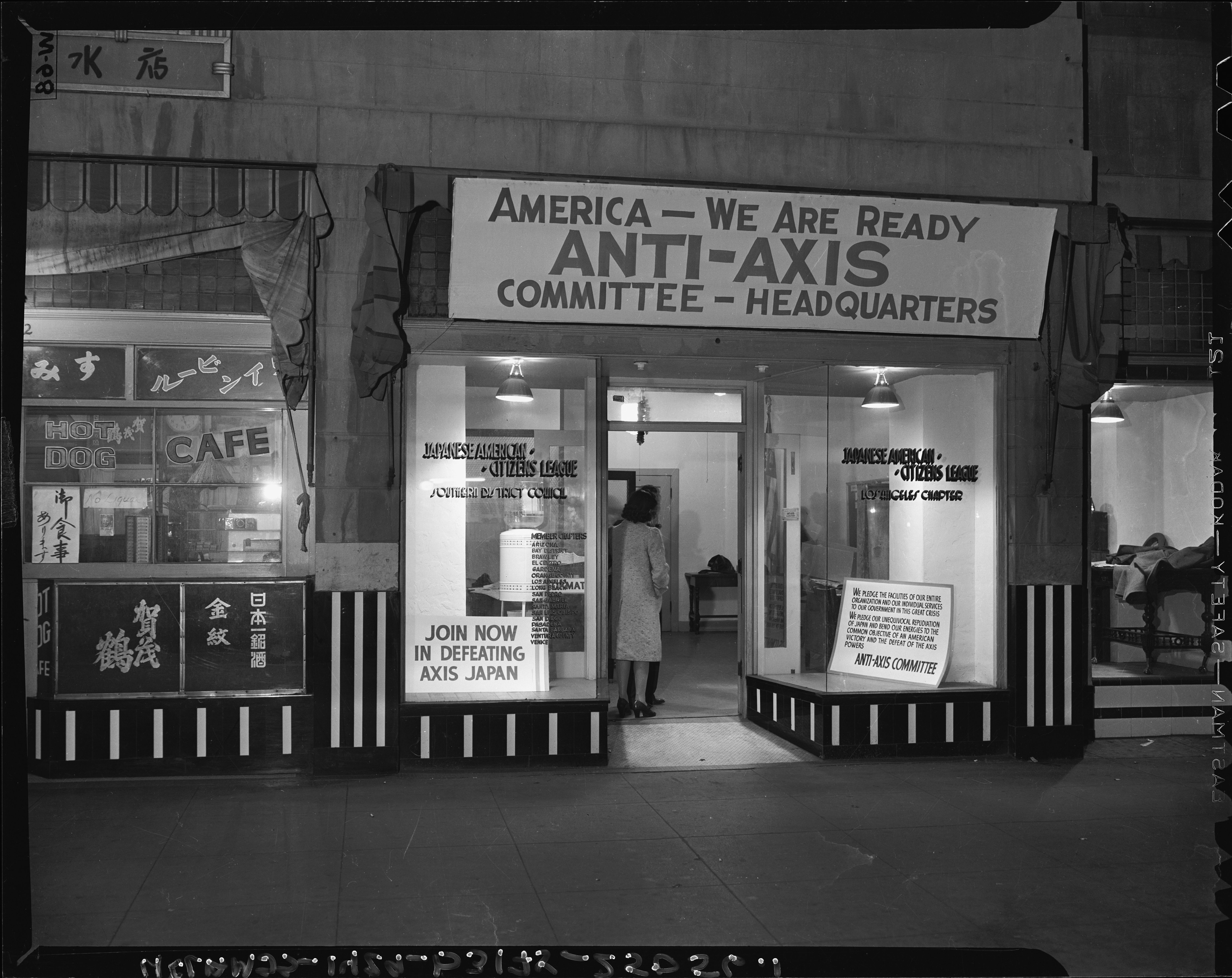
The headquarters of the Japanese American Citizens' League's Anti-Axis Committee in Little Tokyo, 1941.

Following the passage of the Chinese Exclusion Act of 1882, Japanese immigration to the United States increased drastically to fill the resulting labor void. From 1869 to 1910, Los Angeles became a prime location for Japanese immigrants to settle down. By 1910, Los Angeles had the highest percentage of Japanese and Japanese descendants in the country. Japanese immigrants took on the low-wage jobs that were once held by Chinese Immigrants and settled in cities like San Francisco. Japanese immigrants were once recruited to come to the United States to take on jobs on railroads but quickly turned to agriculture as a means of work in Southern California.

In 1905, the Los Angeles Herald-Examiner published an article on the “yellow peril” and related it to Japanese immigrants, as its original creation was against people of Chinese descent. The first group traveled from San Francisco after experiencing anti-Asian sentiment in that city. The early 1900s saw an increase of racism and xenophobia in California to the point where Asian children were being segregated in public schools in San Francisco. After the 1906 earthquake in Northern California, around 2,000-3,000 Japanese immigrants moved to Los Angeles and created areas like Little Tokyo on East Alameda. As the community continued to grow, Little Tokyo extended to the First Street Corridor in Boyle Heights, in the early 1910s.

Boyle Heights was Los Angeles’s largest residential community of Japanese immigrants and Americans, apart from Little Tokyo. In the early 1910s, Boyle Heights was one of the only communities that did not have restricted housing covenants that discriminated against Japanese and other people of color. Boyle Heights was a bustling interracial community where people of different ethnic backgrounds lived amongst each other. In the 1920s and 1930s, Boyle Heights became the center of significant churches, temples, and schools for the Japanese community, “These include the Tenrikyo Junior Church of America at 2727 E. 1st Street (1937‐39), the Konko Church at 2924 E. 1st Street (1937‐38), and the Higashi Honganji Buddhist Temple (1926‐27), all designed by Yos Hirose, and the Japanese Baptist Church at 2923 E. 2nd Street (1926; extant but altered) built by the Los Angeles City Baptist Missionary Society in 1926‐29”. A hospital, also designed by Hirose, opened in 1929 to serve the Japanese American community.

Further south, on Terminal Island in Los Angeles Harbor, a Japanese American fishing community was established, starting around 1906. Prior to World War II, the community had grown to about 3,500 persons of Japanese ancestry.

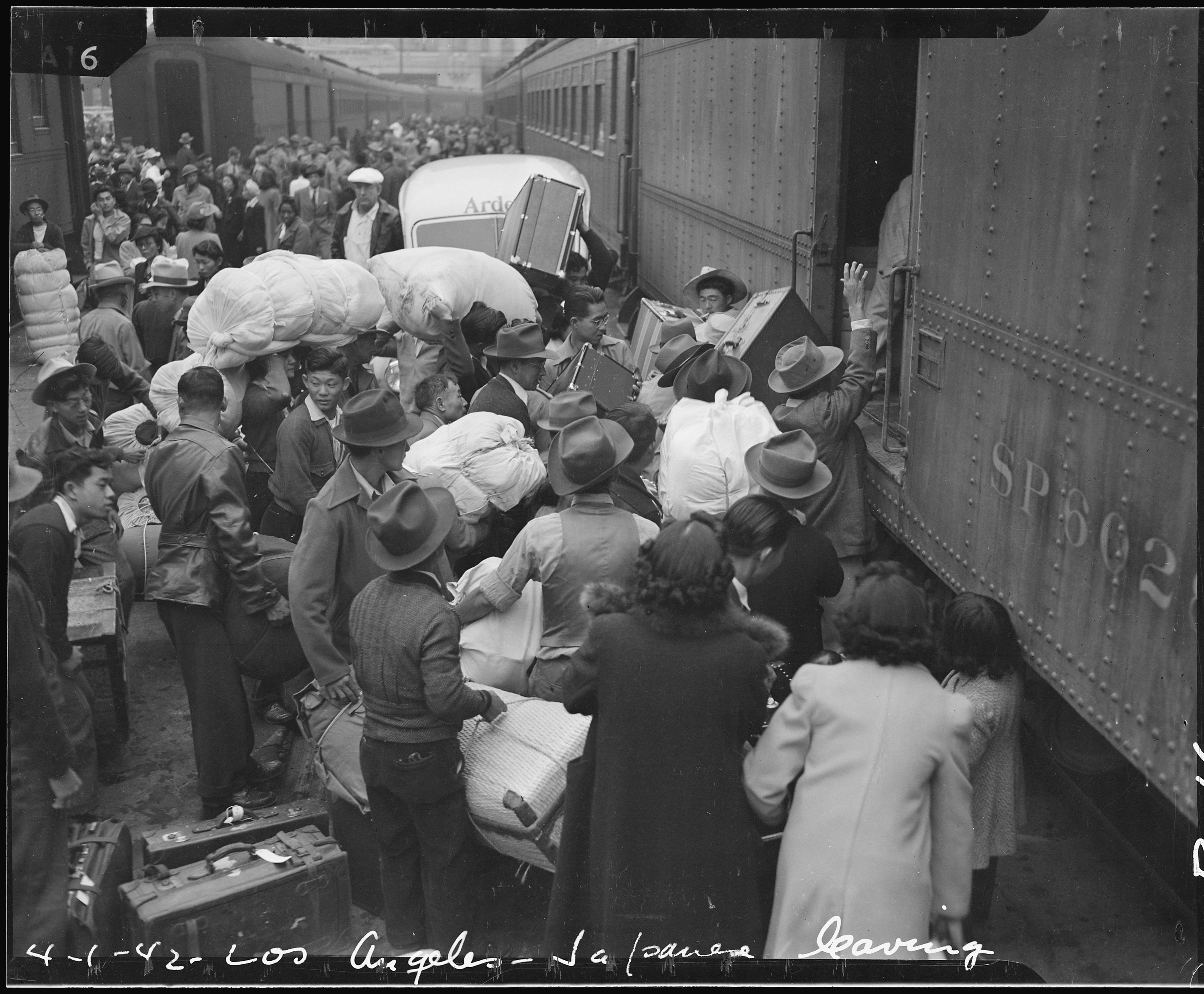
Families of Japanese ancestry being removed from Los Angeles, California during World War II.

By 1941, there were about 36,000 ethnic Japanese people in Los Angeles County. Not long after the attack on Pearl Harbor, President Roosevelt issued Executive Order 9066, which authorized military commanders to exclude "any or all persons" from certain areas in the name of national defense, the Western Defense Command began ordering Japanese Americans living on the West Coast to present themselves for "evacuation" from the newly created military zones. This included many Los Angeles families.

After the war, due to lack of housing in Little Tokyo, many Japanese Americans returning from the camps moved into neighborhoods surrounding the downtown area, into apartments and boarding houses. Notably, Boyle Heights, just east of Little Tokyo, had a large Japanese American population in the 1950s (as it had before the internment) until the arrival of Mexican and Latino immigrants replaced most of them.

In 1981, public hearings were held by the Commission on Wartime Relocation and Internment of Civilians at the Los Angeles State Building as part of a government investigation into the constitutionality of the World War II internment of Japanese Americans. More than 150 people participated in the Los Angeles hearings.

== Geography ==
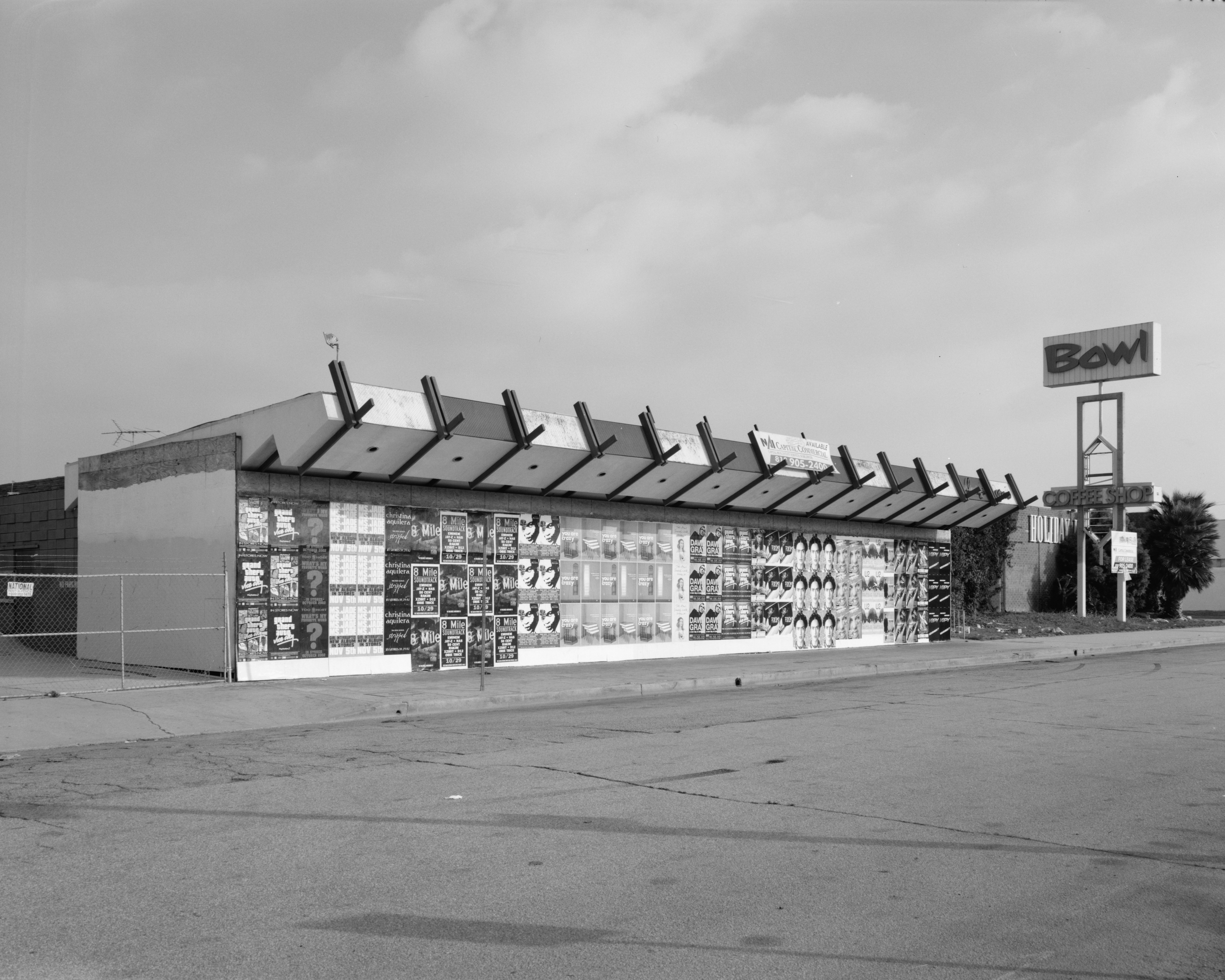
Exterior of Holiday Bowl, designed by architect Helen Liu Fong, in 2002

Little Tokyo in Downtown Los Angeles is the main historical Japantown of Los Angeles. Sawtelle housed a Japantown that became known as "Little Osaka". Jack Fujimoto, author of Sawtelle: West Los Angeles's Japantown, wrote that the name was given because of the "many colorful eateries and shops." The city put up community signs "Sawtelle Japantown" for this area on April 1, 2015. After court ruling that the segregation covenants in the Crenshaw district were unconstitutional, the area opened up to other races. A large Japanese American settlement ensued, which can still be found along Coliseum Street, east and west of Crenshaw Boulevard. The Holiday Bowl was built by Japanese entrepreneurs as a combination bowling alley, pool hall, bar and coffee shop in 1958 and served Crenshaw's Japanese residents who "had not long before suffered Manzanar's internment camps and a blanket racial ban by the American Bowling Congress". Blacks started arriving in the 1960s, and by the 1970s were the majority.

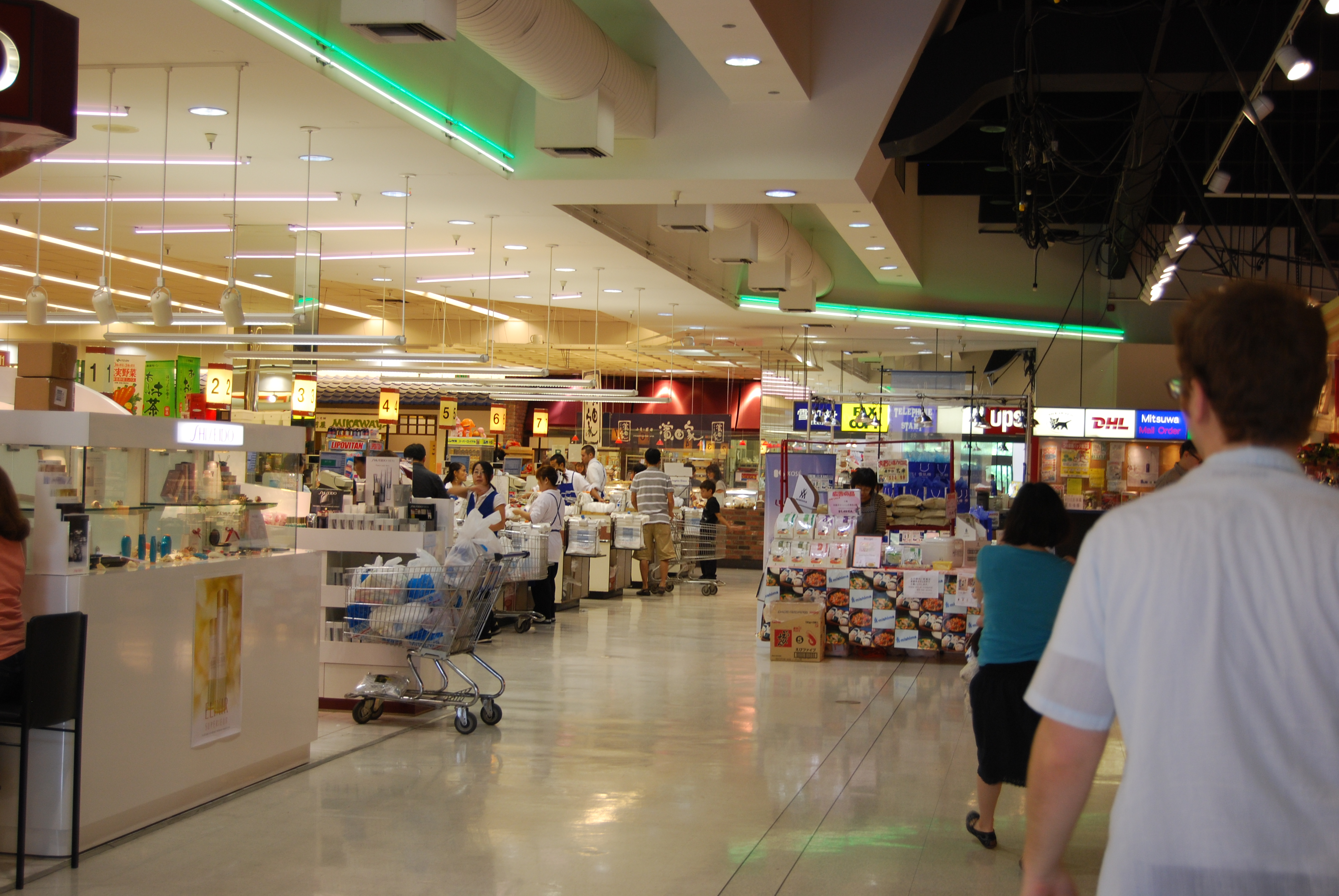
The interior of the Mitsuwa in Torrance

As of 2014, Torrance has the second largest concentration of ethnic Japanese people of any U.S. city, after Honolulu. The city has headquarters of Japanese automakers and offices of other Japanese companies. Because of this many Japanese restaurants and other Japanese cultural offerings are in the city, and Willy Blackmore of L.A. Weekly wrote that Torrance was "essentially Japan's 48th prefecture". A Mitsuwa supermarket, Japanese schools, and Japanese banks serve the community.

In the pre-World War II period the South Bay region was one of the few areas that allowed non-U.S. citizens to acquire property, so a Japanese presence came. According to John Kaji, a Torrance resident quoted in Public Radio International who was the son of Toyota's first American-based accountant, the Japanese corporate presence in Torrance, beginning with Toyota, attracted many ethnic Japanese. Toyota moved its operations to its Torrance campus in 1982 because of its proximity to the Port of Long Beach and Los Angeles International Airport, and it was followed by many other Japanese companies.

As of 1988 Gardena also has a large Japanese-American community. Early in Gardena's history, Japanese migrants played a role in the agrarian economy.

Jack Rodman, a managing partner of the accounting firm Kenneth Leventhal & Co., stated in 1989 that the most preferred place for Japanese businesspeople to settle is the Palos Verdes Peninsula, citing the inexpensiveness compared to Bel Air, Brentwood, and Pacific Palisades, proximity to the ocean, and the ranch-style houses because they are "more like a Japanese home--single-story, spread out." He stated that the other preferred places were Pasadena, San Marino, and Arcadia. In addition Rodman said some Japanese businesspeople liked to settle in Hancock Park in the City of Los Angeles; Hancock Park is in proximity to the Consulate-General of Japan in Los Angeles.

== Demographics ==
As of 2010, according to the report "A Community Of Contrasts: Asian Americans, Native Hawaiians and Pacific Islanders in Los Angeles County" by the nonprofit group Asian Americans Advancing Justice - Los Angeles (formerly the Asian Pacific American Legal Center), of the Asian ethnic groups, 70% of Japanese Americans were born in the U.S., the highest such rate of the Asian ethnic groups. According to the same report, 19% of Japanese Americans were senior citizens, the highest such rate of the Asian ethnic groups, and from 2000-2010 the population of Japanese Americans increased by 1%, the lowest such rate of the Asian ethnic groups.

In 1986 Hiroshi Matsuoka, the Japan Business Association of Southern California (JBA, 南カリフォルニア日系企業協会 Minami Kariforunia Nikkei Kigyō Kyōkai) executive director, stated that there were about 3,500 Japanese nationals working for 530 branch companies of Japanese companies in the Los Angeles metropolitan area.

== Economy ==
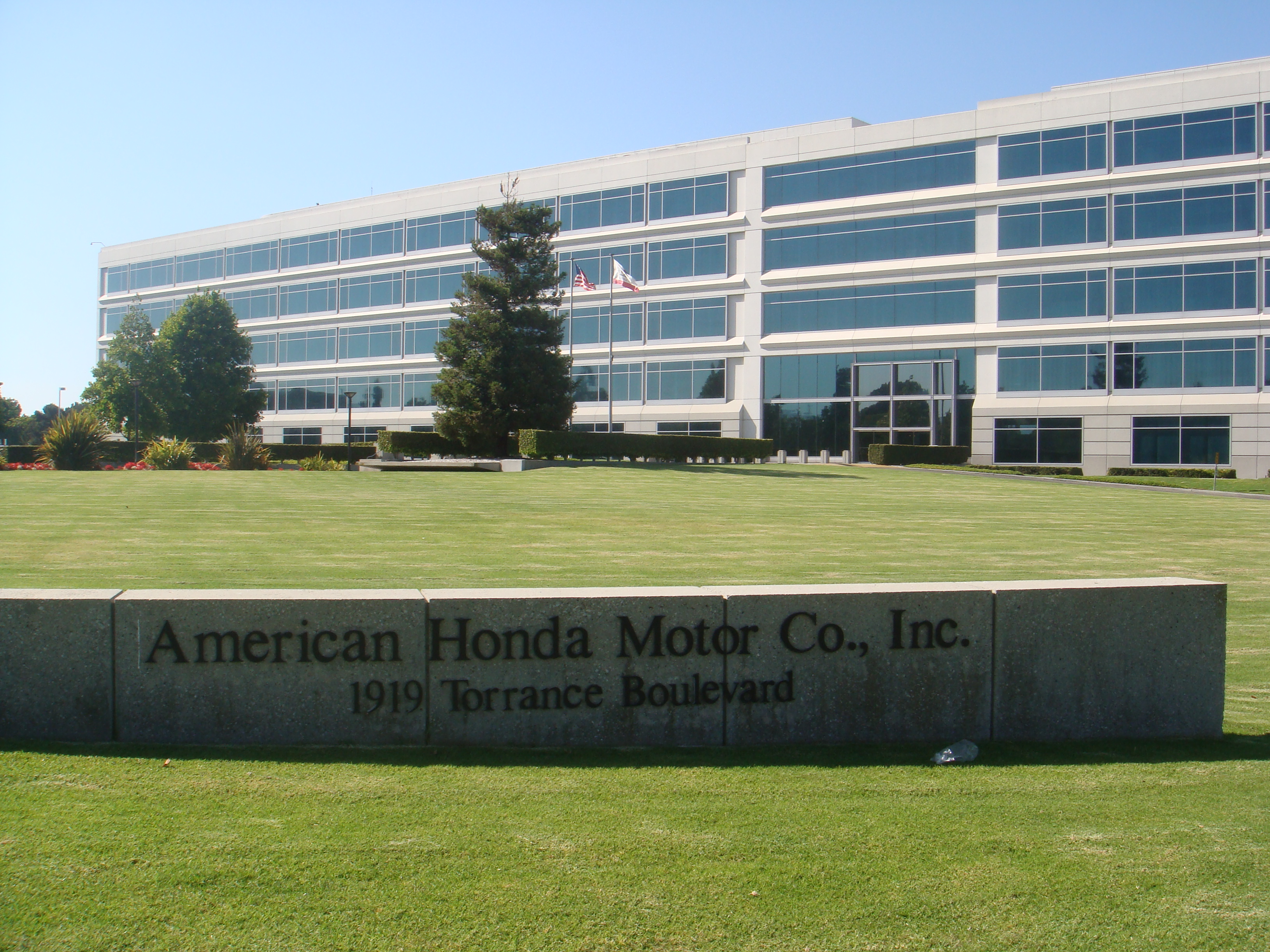
American Honda Motor Company headquarters in Torrance

The city of Torrance has headquarters of Japanese automakers and offices of other Japanese companies. The headquarters of American Honda Motor Company, Honda's North American division, is located in Torrance. Toyota Motor Sales, U.S.A., Inc., the U.S. division of Toyota, has its headquarters in Torrance. Toyota has relocated to Plano, Texas in 2017. All Nippon Airways operates its United States headquarters, a customer relations and services office, in Torrance. Also the Japanese supermarket chains Mitsuwa Marketplace and Nijiya Market are headquartered in Torrance.

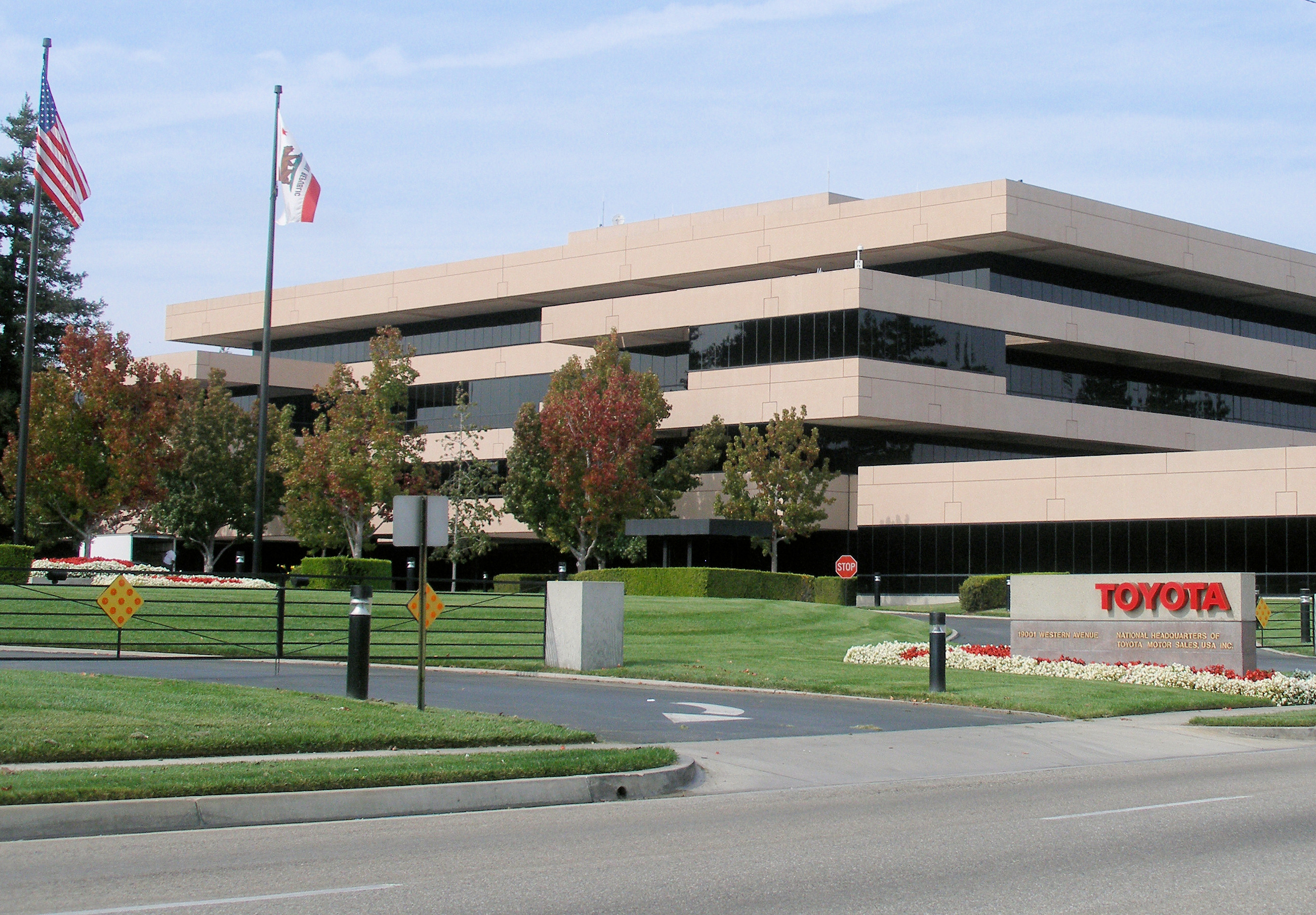
Former Toyota Motor Sales, U.S.A., Inc. headquarters in Torrance, California

Japan Airlines moved its U.S. headquarters to El Segundo in 2003. Nissan previously had its North American headquarters in Carson. In the summer of 2006 the Nissan headquarters moved to Tennessee.

As of 1987, the membership list of the Japanese Business Association of Southern California stated that in an area between Los Angeles International Airport and the Port of Los Angeles, there were 194 Japanese companies which had branch operations. In 1989, Sadao "Bill" Kita, the executive director of the JBA, stated that there were 693 Japanese companies with offices in Southern California. In a period before 1994, the peak number of Japanese expatriate executives and managers in Southern California was 3,800. In 1994, according to Kita, the number declined to 615. The number of expatriate managers and executives, by that year, had declined to 3,400. At that point, Japan was experiencing an economic recession.

== Education ==
In 1979 there were two full-time and part-time schools in Greater Los Angeles catering to Japanese national students. They had a total of 356 students. In the 1980s the increase in Japanese businesses resulted in an increase in enrollment in full-time and part-time schools catering to Japanese national students. In 1987, there were three school campuses with 4,430 students. The campuses were located in Gardena, Hermosa Beach, and Torrance.

=== Full-time education ===
As of 1989, the Torrance Unified School District and the Palos Verdes Peninsula Unified School District had 42% of all Japanese-speaking students enrolled by the 100 school districts in Los Angeles County. The Palos Verdes district had 346 students born in Japan in 1985, while the number increased to 434 in 1988.

The Nishiyamato Academy of California is located in Lomita. The school opened in April 1992. It was founded by Ryotaro Tanose, a Japanese Diet member, as a branch of the Nishiyamato Gakuen Junior and Senior High School (Nishiyamato Academy) in Kawai, Nara Prefecture. It was originally located in the former Dapplegray School building in Rolling Hills Estates. In 1993 the school served grades 6 through 8 and had 38 students. In 1994 it served grades 5 through 9 and had 71 students. As of 1994 the school had a monthly tuition of $630 ($1368.49 when considering inflation).

There was previously another full-time Japanese school, the International Bilingual School, founded to educate children of Japanese nationals working for companies such as Honda and Toyota. The school opened in Torrance in 1979, later moved to Hermosa Beach, before moving to a Palos Verdes school district facility in Palos Verdes Estates in 1992. By 2002 the school district had filed suit to force the International Bilingual School to leave the school property.

=== Part-time education ===
Asahi Gakuen (あさひ学園 "School of the Rising Sun") is a part-time Japanese school in the Los Angeles area. The school was founded by the Association for the Promotion of Japanese Language Education in Los Angeles. In 1988, the school had 2,500 students. The school teaches the Japanese language, science, social sciences, and mathematics. As of 1987 the school teaches all four aspects in each school day. The Japan Traders' Club of Los Angeles (Nihon Boeki Konwa-kai), as of 1997, financially supports the school.

The main campus of the East-West Japanese School (三育東西学園 San'iku Tōzai Gakuen) is located in Gardena, adjacent to the Gardena Seventh-day Adventist Church and across from the Gardena Civic Center. It also has branch campuses: the Rolling Hills Campus (ローリングヒルズ校 Rōringuhiruzu Kō) in Rolling Hills Estates and the Irvine/Costa Mesa Campus (アーバイン／コスタメサ校 Ābain/Kosutamesa Kō) in Costa Mesa. Its primary customer base consists of Japanese children who are enrolled in American schools. As of 1987 most of its students are from Buddhist families. The school offers two hour classes on weeknights.

As of 1987 the Southern California Conference of Seventh-day Adventists does outreach to the Japanese community by sponsoring the East-West School. That year, the principal, Akira Nakamura, stated that students do 10-minute bible studies as part of the program even though most students are not Christian. In 1987 the annual tuition was $780 ($2210.46) and registration was $280 ($793.5) for elementary school students. The school had different fees for students at the junior high school and kindergarten levels.

Nishiyamato Academy offers its own Saturday school program.

The Japanese Language School Unified System, founded in 1949, included a main campus in Los Angeles and a branch campus in Sun Valley as of 1988. The San Fernando Valley Japanese Language Institute in Arleta was founded circa 1928.

The Rafu Chuo Gakuen is a part time Japanese language school that is located Saratoga Street in Boyle Heights. Founded in February 1929, under the name Tokiwa Gakuen but later moved that same year and was renamed Boyle Heights Chuo Gakuen. By 1932, Boyle Heights Chuo Gakuen, to its present-day location in Boyle Heights and assumed the name Rafu Chuo Gakuen. Rafu Chuo Gakuen has served as a cultural and language center for children of all ages in the Japanese community. It is part of the Kyodo System of schools that focuses on fluency, cultural understanding, and history for children in elementary through high school.

== Culture and recreation ==
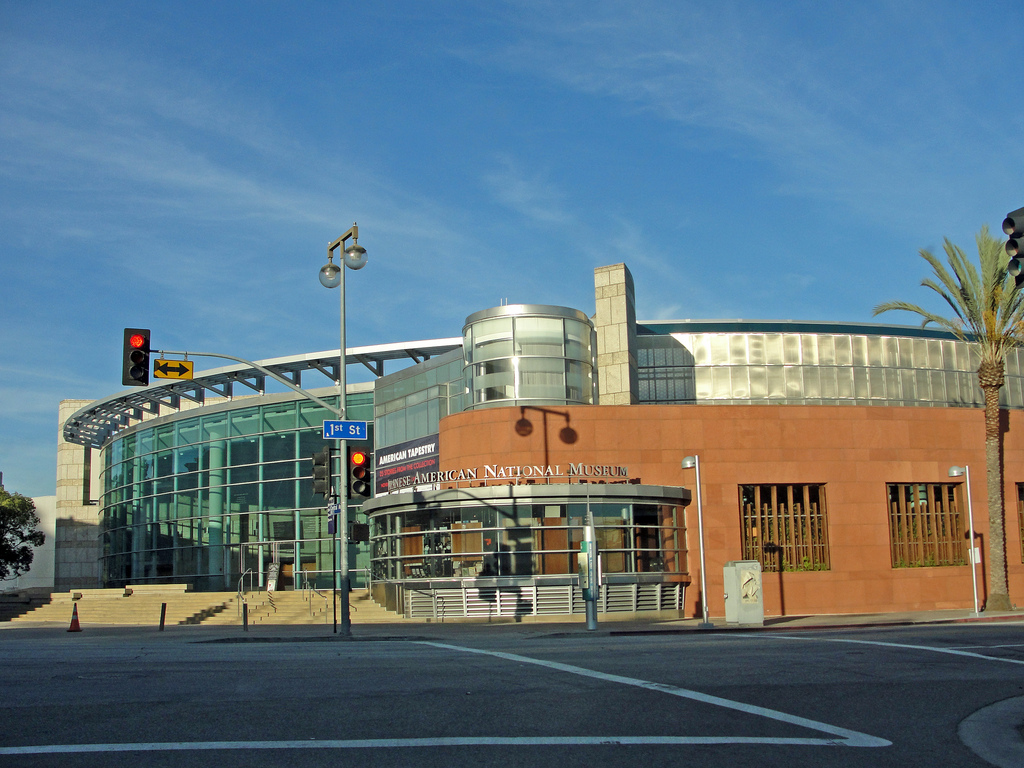
Japanese American National Museum in Little Tokyo

The Japanese American National Museum and the Japanese American Cultural and Community Center (JACCC) are located in Little Tokyo. The community center features the George J. Doizaki Gallery, the 880-seat Aratani/Japan America Theatre, the JACCC Plaza (designed by Isamu Noguchi), and the James Irvine Japanese Garden. The Japanese American Veterans Memorial Court was erected on the San Pedro Street side of the community center building to honor the Japanese Americans who died in service. Additionally, the Go For Broke Monument, which commemorates Japanese Americans who served in the United States Army during World War II is located on the north side of Little Tokyo, behind the museum. The Union Center for the Arts (former Japanese Union Church of Los Angeles) is located on Judge John Aiso Street. The Nisei Week festival is held early in August every year and is sponsored by various Little Tokyo businesses.

Similar Japanese American Community Centers to the one in Little Tokyo were founded after the trauma of the internment of Japanese Americans. Today, most locations have become centers for cultural exchange and can be found in Venice, Long Beach, Sun Valley, and in other neighborhoods with historically large Japanese populations.

Because of the Japanese business presence, many Japanese restaurants and other Japanese cultural offerings are in Torrance, and Willy Blackmore of L.A. Weekly wrote that Torrance was "essentially Japan's 48th prefecture".

The OC Japan Fair takes place in Orange County.

== Notable residents ==
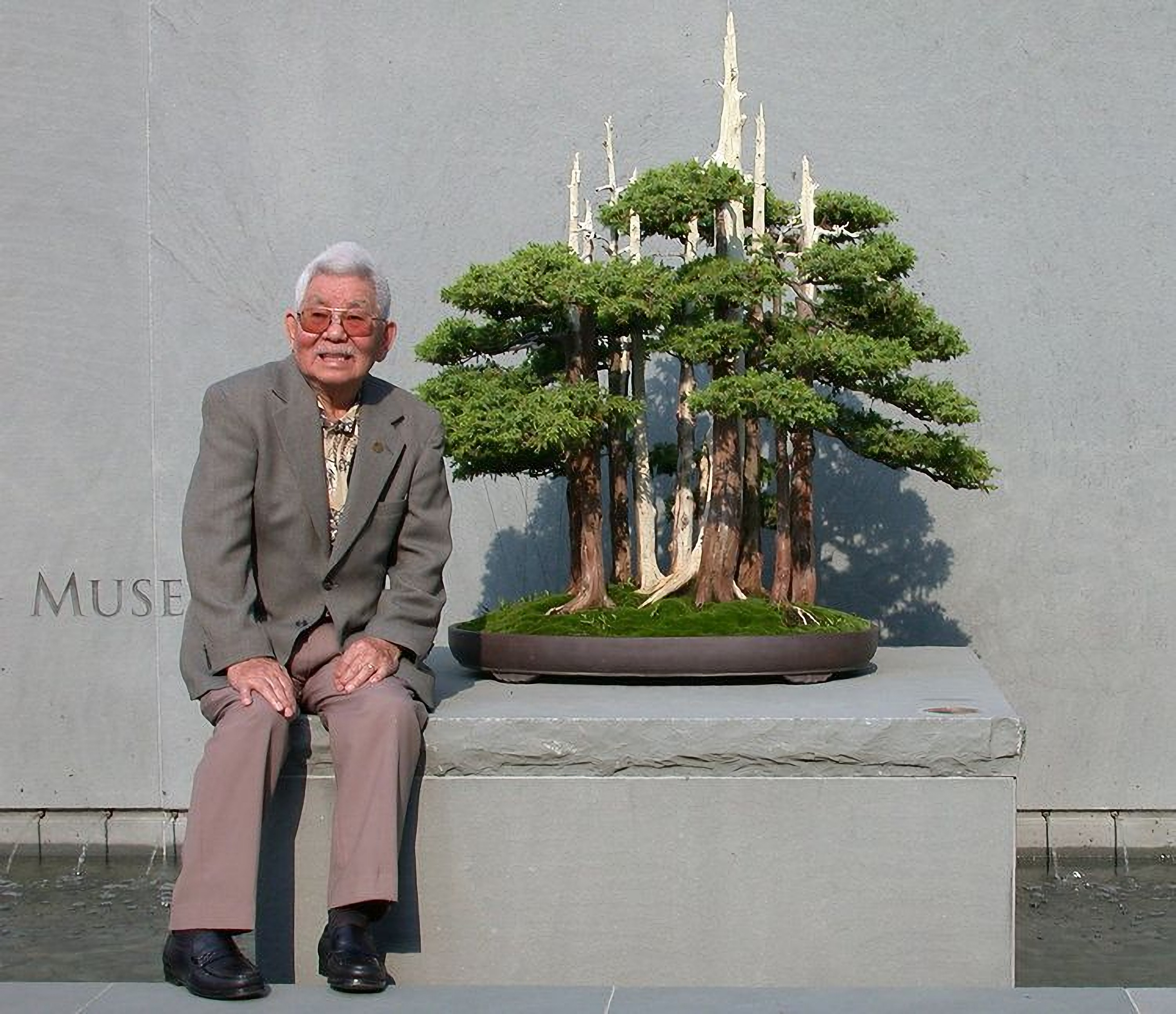
John Naka with his masterpiece Goshin at the United States National Arboretum

- John F. Aiso (1909–1987), judge
- Sei Fujii (1882–1954), a civil rights activist
- Brittany Ishibashi (born 1980), actress (Orange County)
- Lance Ito (born 1950), judge
- Shoson Nagahara, writer
- John Naka (1914–2004), horticulturist
- Kyle Nakazawa (born 1988), soccer player
- Isamu Noguchi (1904–1988), artist & architect
- Thomas Noguchi (born 1927), medical examiner-coroner
- Jon Miyahara (1941–2025), American actor
- Yuji Okumoto (born 1959), actor
- Jolene Purdy (born 1983), actress (half-Japanese) - From Torrance
- James Shigeta (1929–2014), actor
- T. K. Shindo (1890–1974), a photographer
- Miiko Taka (born 1925), actress
- George Takei (born 1937), actor
- Togo Tanaka (1916–2009), a newspaper journalist and editor
- Paul Terasaki (1929–2016), scientist
- Tamlyn Tomita (born 1966), actress
- Miyoshi Umeki (1929–2007), Academy Award-winning actress
- Karen Fukuhara (born 1992), actress

== See also ==
- Bibliography of California history
- Bibliography of Los Angeles
- Outline of the history of Los Angeles
