= Oin Junior and Senior High School =

Coordinates: 35.7036°N 139.7567°E

- 桜蔭中学校・高等学校
- Schola Media et Summa Oinensis
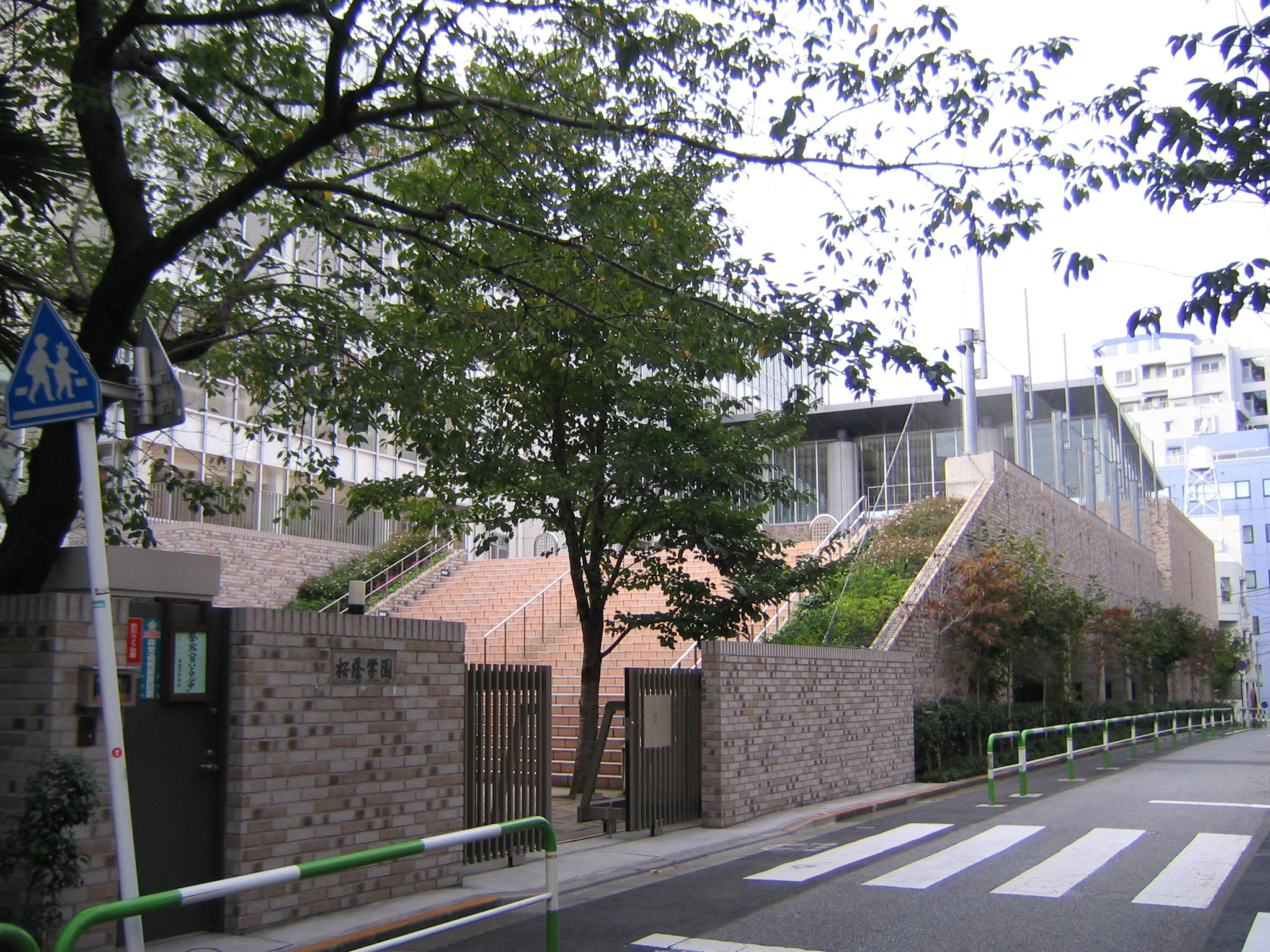
- 1-5-25, Hongo, Bunkyo, Tokyo, Japan; 113-0033

Information
- Funding type: Private
- Mottoes: 勤勉 ・温雅 ・聡明であれ 責任を重んじ、礼儀を厚くし、よき社会人であれ (Diligence, refinement and intelligence Respect for responsibility and an unfailingly courteous manner make for good citizens)
- Established: 23 April 1924

Oin Junior and Senior High School (桜蔭中学校・高等学校) is a private girls' school located in Hongo, Bunkyo, Tokyo that provides six-year secondary education programmes.

== Overview ==
The school was founded in 1924 by members of the alumnae club of Tokyo Women's Normal School, Oin-kai (櫻蔭会). The first principal of the school, Kikuno Gokan (後閑菊野), had been responsible for the education of Empress Kojun, and she placed focus on manners in the creation of Oin as well.

Oin is one of the largest sources of successful applicants to the University of Tokyo.

Number of Successful Applicants to the University of Tokyo by School Attended (2026)
School	Type	Number of successful applicants
Kaisei	Private boys’ school	198
Nada	Private boys’ school	95
Seiko Gakuin	Private boys’ school	93
Komaba (University of Tsukuba)	National boys’ school	89
Makuhari (Shibuya Kyouiku Gakuen)	Private coeducational school	82
Azabu	Private boys’ school	76
Nishiyamato Gakuen	Private coeducational school	75
Hibiya	Public coeducational school	67
Oin	Private girls’ school	62
Eiko Gakuen	Private boys’ school	47

== Notable alumnae ==
=== Politicians ===
- Miki Yamada: Member of the House of Representatives (LDP)
- Mayuko Toyota: Former member of the House of Representatives (LDP)
