= Greenwood station (MBTA) =

Train station in Wakefield, Massachusetts, US

Greenwood
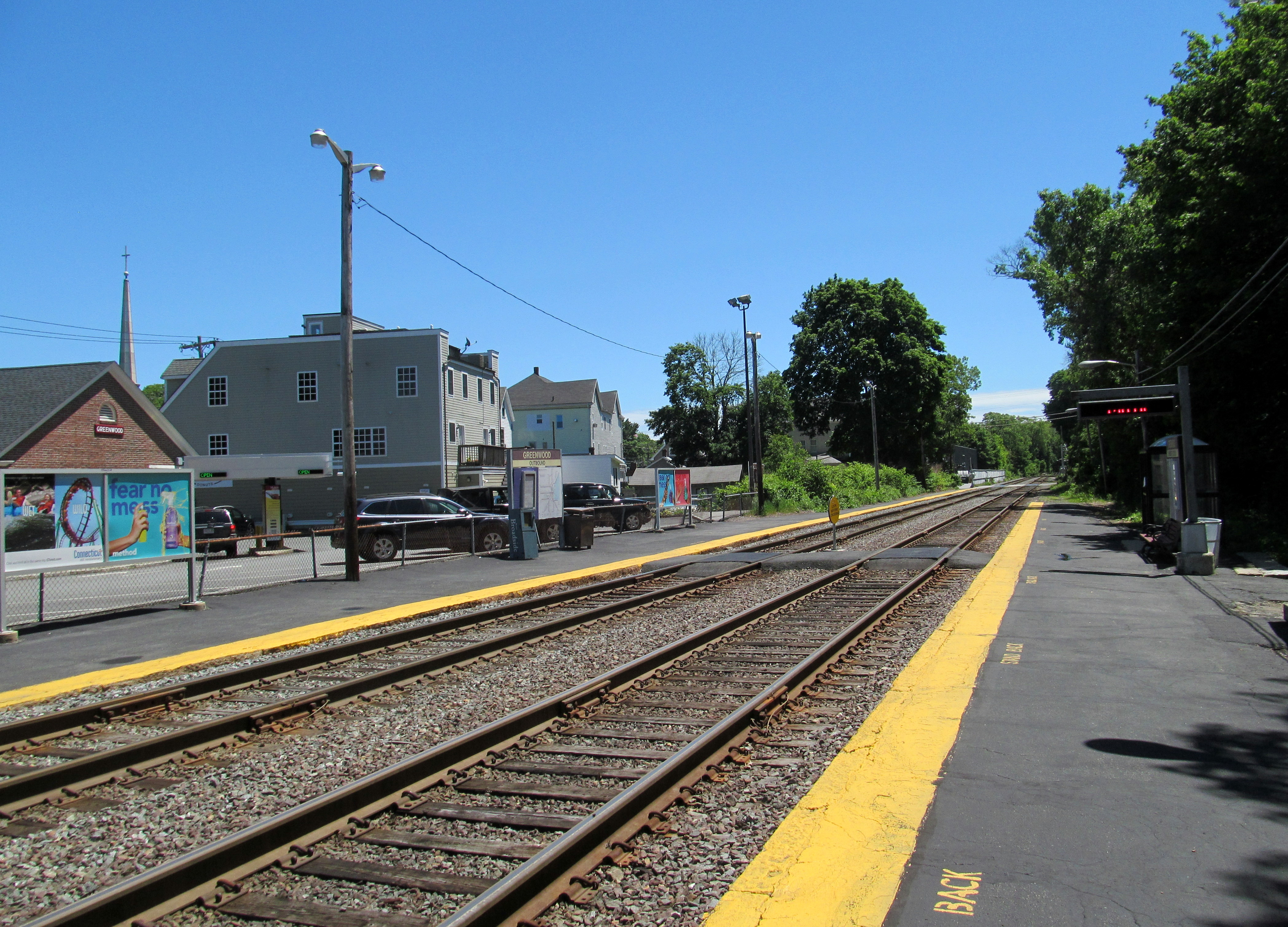
- Greenwood station in June 2017

General information
- Location: 907 Main Street; Wakefield, Massachusetts
- Coordinates: 42.48296°N 71.06735°W
- Owner: Town of Wakefield
- Line: Western Route
- Platforms: 2 side platforms
- Tracks: 2
- Connections: MBTA bus: 137

Construction
- Parking: 76 spaces ($3.00 daily)
- Cycle facilities: 6 spaces
- Accessible: No

Other information
- Fare zone: 2

Passengers
- 2024: 77 daily boardings

Services
Preceding station	MBTA	Following station
Melrose Highlands toward North Station	Haverhill Line	Wakefield toward Haverhill
Location

Greenwood station is an MBTA Commuter Rail station on the Haverhill Line located in the Greenwood neighborhood of Wakefield, Massachusetts. The station consists of two side platforms serving the line's two tracks. The low-level platforms are not accessible.

== History ==
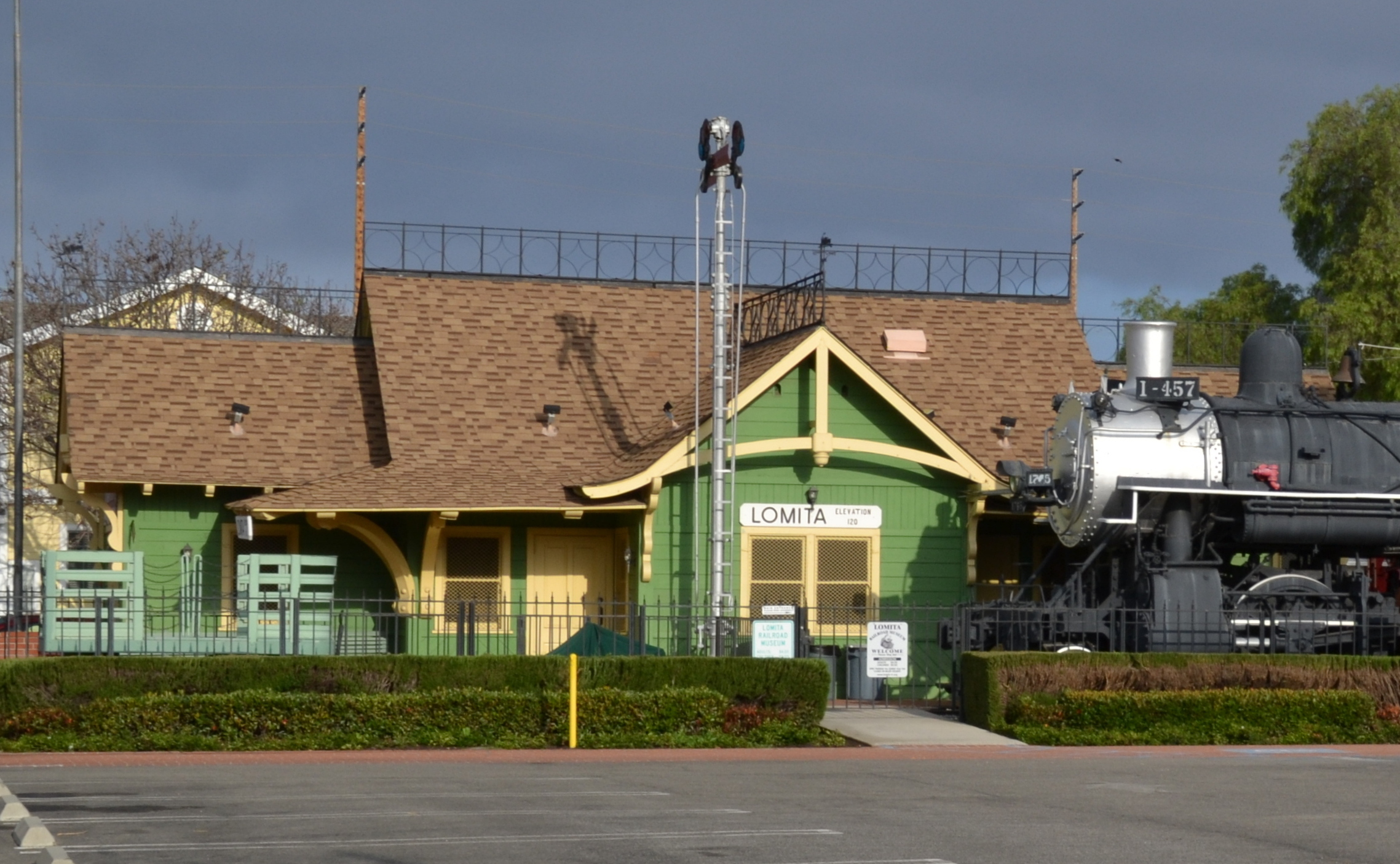
The replica of Greenwood station at Lomita Railroad Museum

The Boston and Maine Railroad (B&M) opened its line from Wilmington Junction to Boston on July 1, 1845. Greenwood station opened by the end of the decade in South Reading (later renamed Wakefield).

The ticket office in the station building closed on February 22, 1952. By 1962, the former station building was relocated to the Pleasure Island amusement park for use on an antique railroad. The façade of the Lomita Railroad Museum in Lomita, California, is a replica of the original Greenwood station.

Rail service on the inner Haverhill Line was suspended from September 9 to November 5, 2023, to accommodate signal work. Substitute bus service was operated between Reading and Oak Grove, serving all intermediate stops.

In 2024, the MBTA tested a temporary freestanding accessible platform design at Beverly Depot. These platforms do not require alterations to the existing platforms, thus skirting federal rules requiring full accessibility renovations when stations are modified, and were intended to provide interim accessibility at lower cost pending full reconstruction. In May 2024, the agency identified Greenwood as a possible future location for the platform design.
