= Josh Simmons =

American football player (born 2002)

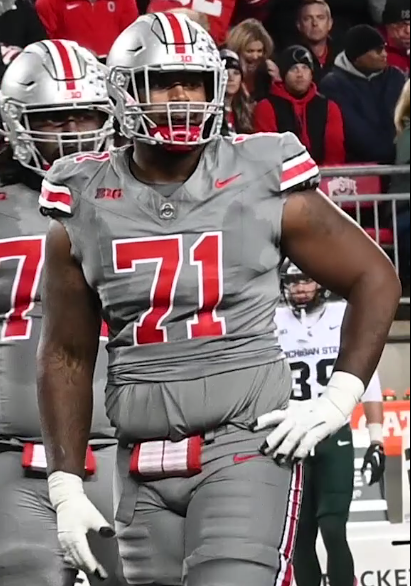
- Simmons with the Ohio State Buckeyes in 2023

No. 71 – Kansas City Chiefs
- Position: Offensive tackle
- Roster status: Injured reserve

Personal information
- Born: December 26, 2002 (age 23); San Diego, California, U.S.
- Listed height: 6 ft 5 in (1.96 m)
- Listed weight: 310 lb (141 kg)

Career information
- High school: Helix (La Mesa, California)
- College: San Diego State (2021–2022); Ohio State (2023–2024)
- NFL draft: 2025: 1st round, 32nd overall pick

Career history
- Kansas City Chiefs (2025–present)

Awards and highlights
- CFP national champion (2024); Third-team All-Big Ten (2024)

Career NFL statistics as of 2025
- Games played: 8
- Games started: 8
- Stats at Pro Football Reference

Joshua Simmons (born December 26, 2002) is an American professional football offensive tackle for the Kansas City Chiefs of the National Football League (NFL). He played college football for the San Diego State Aztecs and Ohio State Buckeyes, winning a national championship with the latter in 2024. Simmons was selected by the Chiefs in the first round of the 2025 NFL draft.

== Early life ==
Simmons was born on December 26, 2002, in San Diego, California. He initially attended Madison High School before transferring to Helix High School; he was rated a three-star recruit and committed to play college football at San Diego State University for the Aztecs.

== College career ==
=== San Diego State ===
As a freshman in 2022, Simmons started all 13 games for the Aztecs, playing 799 snaps After the season, he entered the NCAA transfer portal.

=== Ohio State ===
Simmons transferred to the Ohio State University. Ahead of the 2023 season, he earned the starting left tackle role over Tegra Tshabola. On October 12, 2024, during the first half of Ohio State's 31–32 loss at Oregon, Simmons suffered a significant knee injury. It was speculated that he had torn his ACL, but later revealed he had actually suffered a torn patellar tendon. On December 4, 2024, Simmons declared for the 2025 NFL draft.

== Professional career ==
Pre-draft measurables
Height	Weight	Arm length	Hand span	Wingspan	Bench press
6 ft 4 7/8 in (1.95 m)	317 lb (144 kg)	33 in (0.84 m)	10 in (0.25 m)	6 ft 10 in (2.08 m)	33 reps
All values from NFL Combine/Pro Day

The Kansas City Chiefs selected Simmons in the first round with the 32nd pick in the 2025 NFL draft. The Chiefs previously held the 31st pick and moved down one spot with the Philadelphia Eagles while also acquiring a fifth-round pick (164th overall).

=== 2025 season ===
Simmons started at left tackle in the first five games of the Chiefs' 2025 season. He was ruled out for Weeks 6 through 9 due to personal reasons involving his family. Simmons suffered a dislocation and fracture in his wrist in the team's Week 13 matchup against the Dallas Cowboys; he was placed on injured reserve on December 3, 2025.

== Personal life ==
Simmons' father Nelson Simmons played in MLB for three seasons in the 1980s. His uncle Chris Fuamatu-Ma'afala was a fullback in the NFL for seven seasons. Simmons is of partial Samoan descent.
