= Minato School =

Japanese weekend school in California, US

Coordinates: 32.8389°N 117.1314°W

San Diego Japanese School
- サンディエゴ補習授業校

Location
- (office) 9150 Chesapeake Drive, Suite 170, San Diego, CA 92123 (classroom) 4833 Doliva Dr, San Diego, CA 92117

Information
- School type: Private Weekend School
- Established: 1978
- Grades: Elementary to High School
- Enrollment: 500 (approx.)
- Website: Minato Gakuen

The San Diego Japanese School (Japanese: サンディエゴ補習授業校, romanized: San Diego Hoshū Jugyō Kō), also known as Minato School (Japanese: みなと学園, romanized: Minato Gakuen), is a Japanese weekend school in San Diego, California. Classes are held at James Madison High School in Clairemont, while the school office is in another location in San Diego.

== History ==
It was established in 1978, meaning San Diego–based Japanese people who previously attended Asahi Gakuen in the Los Angeles area now had their own Japanese weekend school. Initially, the school was based in the Clairemont neighborhood in San Diego.

Initially, it had 40 pupils grouped into four classes. In 1988 the enrollment was almost 300, and almost 70% of the students were at the elementary school level. Classes were held in 22 temporary buildings at Wagenheim Junior High School in Mira Mesa, San Diego. In 1996 Minato Gakuen switched to holding classes at Eastlake High School in Chula Vista. The South County Economic Development Council (EDC) helped broker an agreement between Minato Gakuen and the party that operates Eastlake High, Sweetwater Union High School District. The expected enrollment post-move was a total of 500 students. The board of directors planned to donate funds to the school district as a part of the agreement. In July 1996 the school district's board of directors formally accepted the donation, totaling $10,000. School offices were located in a separate area.

Several students, as of 1997, had parents who worked for the San Diego area Sony offices and other Japanese companies.

In 2015 the school began holding its classes at Madison High.

== See also ==
- Japanese language education in the United States
