= Nara 3rd district =

Japan House of Representatives constituency

Coordinates: 34.3711°N 135.8713°E

Nara 3rd District
- Parliamentary constituency for the Japanese House of Representatives
- Numbered map of Nara Prefecture single-member districts
- Prefecture: Nara
- Proportional District: Kinki
- Electorate: 352,656

Current constituency
- Created: 1994
- Seats: One
- Party: Liberal Democratic
- Representative: Taido Tanose
- Municipalities: Gojō, Gose, Kashihara, Katsuragi, Sakurai, Uda, Yamatotakada, Takaichi District, Uda District, and Yoshino District

Nara 3rd district (奈良県第3区, Nara-ken dai-sanku or simply 奈良3区, Nara-sanku) is a single-member constituency of the House of Representatives in the National Diet of Japan located in Nara Prefecture.

LDP candidate Taido Tanose was elected in 2017. Tanose resigned from the party and ran as an independent in the 2021 election following reports that he had visited a hostess club during the COVID-19 pandemic in Tokyo. After reelection, he rejoined the LDP.

== List of representatives ==
Election	Representative	Party	Notes
1996	Seisuke Okuno	Liberal Democratic	
2000	Seisuke Okuno	Liberal Democratic	
2003	Shinsuke Okuno	Liberal Democratic	
2005	Shinsuke Okuno	Liberal Democratic	
2009	Masashige Yoshikawa	Democratic	
2012	Shinsuke Okuno	Liberal Democratic	
2014	Shinsuke Okuno	Liberal Democratic	
2017	Taido Tanose	Liberal Democratic	
2021	Taido Tanose	Independent	
2024	Taido Tanose	Liberal Democratic	
2026	Taido Tanose	Liberal Democratic	

== Election results ==
2026
Party	Candidate	Votes	%	±%
LDP	Taido Tanose	120,018	62.8	▲13.6
Ishin	Daisuke Harayama (elected in Kinki PR block)	37,067	19.4	▼2.9
JCP	Atsushi Oota	22,018	11.5	▲0.6
Independent	Hiroaki Yagi	11,868	6.2	
Registered electors		338,448		
Turnout			59.40	▲2.40
LDP hold				

2024
Party	Candidate	Votes	%	±%
LDP	Taido Tanose	92,379	49.2	▼11.6
Ishin	Daisuke Harayama	41,897	22.3	
CDP	Yasushi Kawato	33,101	17.6	
JCP	Atsushi Oota	20,543	10.9	▼7.3
Registered electors		343,656		
Turnout			57.00	▼0.19
LDP hold				

2021
Party	Candidate	Votes	%	±%
Independent	Taido Tanose (Incumbent)	114,553	60.81	New
Communist	Masakatsu Nishikawa	34,334	18.23	
Independent	Shoji Takami	32,669	17.34	New
Anti-NHK	Takashi Kato	6,824	3.62	New
Registered electors		355,246		
Turnout			57.19	▲1.69
Independent hold				

＊Tanose returned to the LDP after being elected.

2017
Party	Candidate	Votes	%	±%
Liberal Democratic	Taido Tanose (Incumbent-Nara 4th)	122,341	61.62	
Kibō no Tō	Kiyoshige Maekawa	55,721	28.07	New
Communist	Susumu Tokoro	20,469	10.31	
Registered electors		369,148		
Turnout			55.50	▲1.75
LDP hold				

2014
Party	Candidate	Votes	%	±%
Liberal Democratic	Shinsuke Okuno (Incumbent)	79,334	52.64	
Innovation	Eriko Kurihara	46,556	30.89	New
Communist	Atsushi Masaki	24,828	16.47	
Registered electors		291,571		
Turnout			53.75	▼8.52
LDP hold				

2012
Party	Candidate	Votes	%	±%
Liberal Democratic	Shinsuke Okuno	76,073	43.12	
Restoration	Masayoshi Nishimine	49,928	28.30	New
Democratic	Masashige Yoshikawa (Incumbent)	35,974	20.39	
Communist	Yoshinori Mameda	14,466	8.20	
Registered electors		291,732		
Turnout			62.27	▼9.58
LDP gain from Democratic				
