= Taido Tanose =

Japanese politician (born 1974)

- 田野瀬 太道
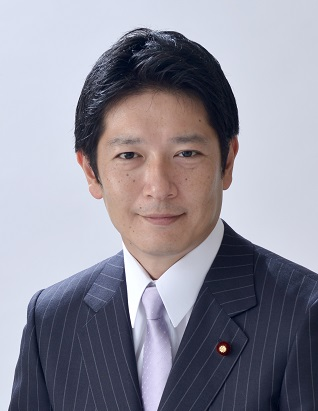
- Official portrait, 2014

Member of the House of Representatives
- Incumbent
- Assumed office 18 December 2012
- Preceded by: Ryotaro Tanose
- Constituency: Nara 4th (2012–2017); Nara 3rd (2017–present)

Personal details
- Born: 4 July 1974 (age 52) Gojō, Nara, Japan
- Party: Liberal Democratic
- Parent: Ryotaro Tanose (father)
- Education: Waseda University

Taido Tanose (田野瀬太道, Tanose Taido; born 4 July 1974) is a Japanese politician serving as a member of the House of Representatives since 2012. He is the son of Ryotaro Tanose.
