= Lomita Railroad Museum =

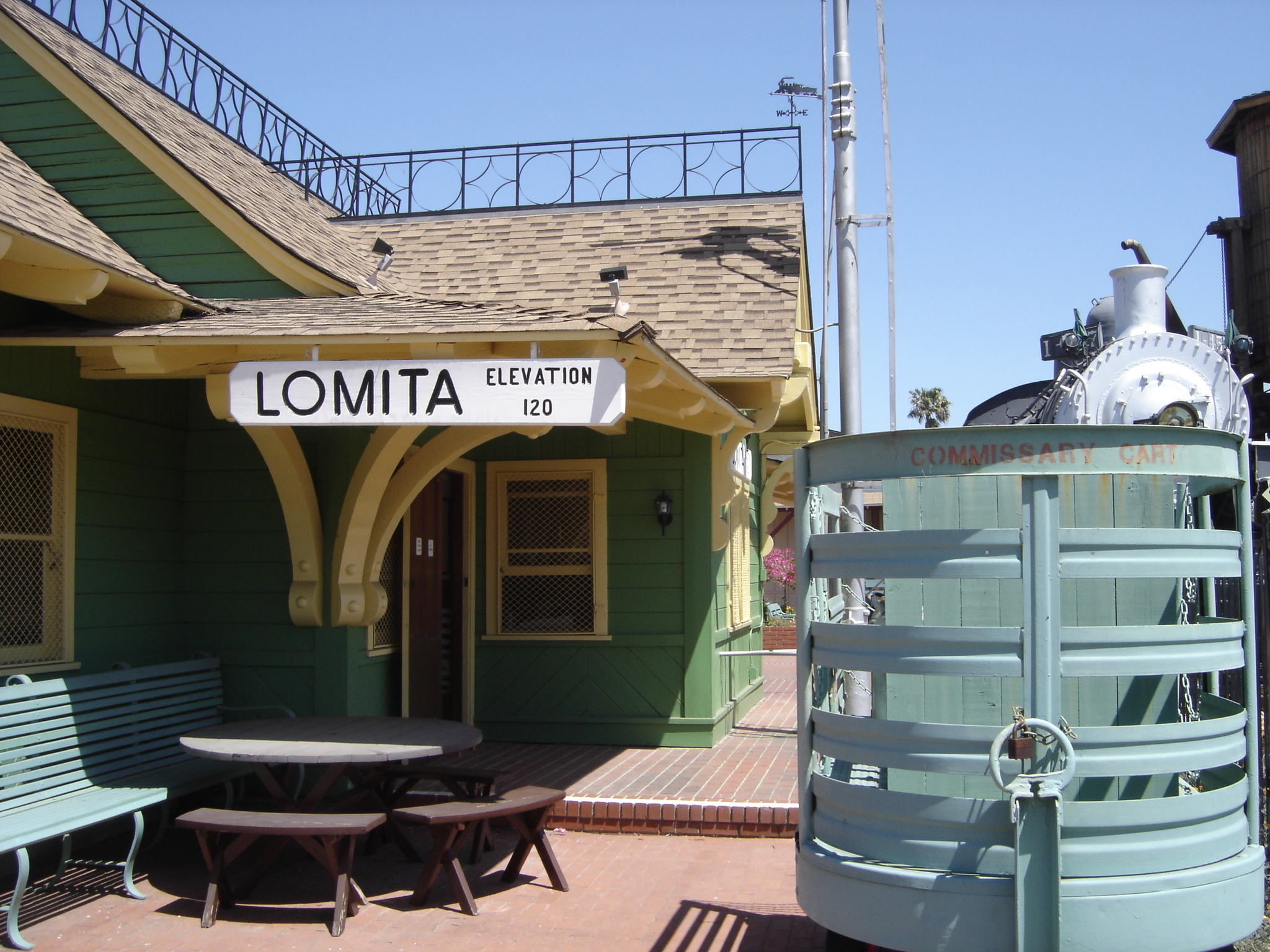
- Established: 1966
- Location: 2137 West 250th Street; Lomita, California
- Coordinates: 33°47′54″N 118°19′7″W
- Type: Railroad museum
- Website: http://www.lomita-rr.org

The Lomita Railroad Museum is a museum in Lomita, California, United States, devoted to California railroad history. “Exhibits include a full-size steam locomotive with tender and caboose, and a station housing scale models, photographs and paintings of trains.”

It was founded by Irene Lewis in the early 1960s on a single lot in the middle of a residential part of Lomita, and had its grand opening on June 23, 1967. The museum building is a replica of a 19th-century depot, Boston & Maine's Greenwood Station that once stood in Wakefield, Massachusetts, and there is a full size replica of a water tower. The museum grounds now function as a small public park.

== Rolling Stock ==
The museum's collection includes:

- 1901 Baldwin steam locomotive
- Southern Pacific whaleback tender
- 1910 Union Pacific caboose
- Santa Fe caboose
- Union Pacific boxcar
- Union Oil tank car
