= Nelson Simmons =

American baseball player (born 1963)

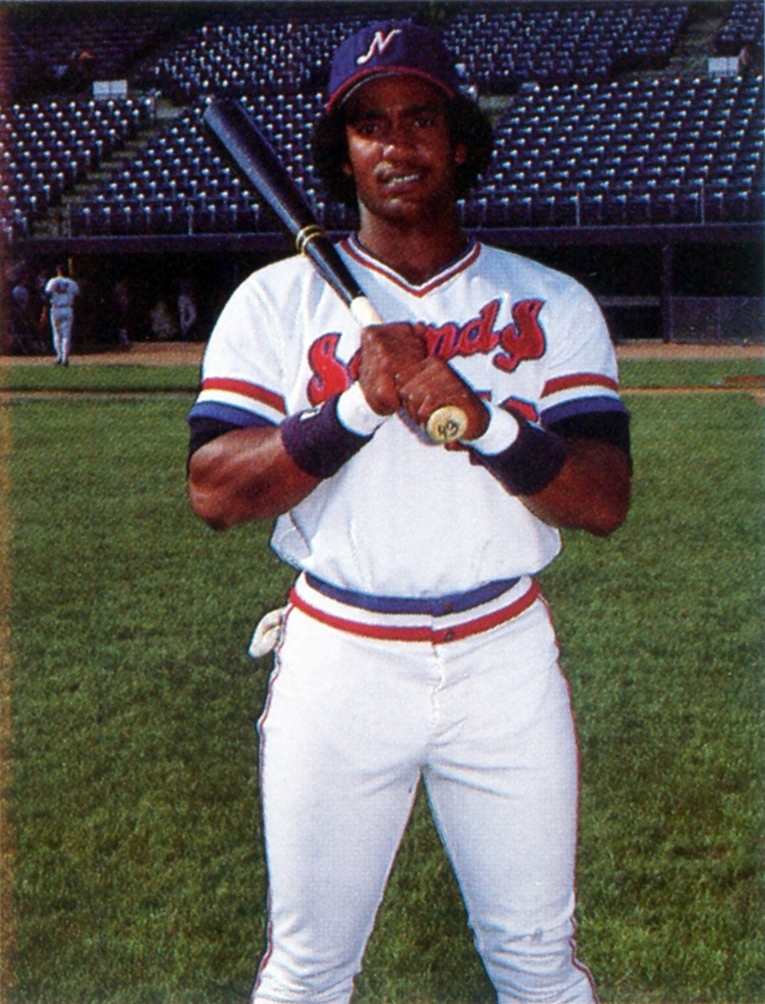
- Simmons with the Nashville Sounds in 1985
- Outfielder
- Born: June 27, 1963 (age 62); Washington, D.C., U.S.
- Batted: Switch Threw: Right

MLB debut
- September 4, 1984, for the Detroit Tigers

Last MLB appearance
- May 8, 1987, for the Baltimore Orioles

MLB statistics
- Batting average: .261
- Home runs: 11
- Runs batted in: 40
- Stats at Baseball Reference

Teams
- Detroit Tigers (1984–1985); Baltimore Orioles (1987)

Nelson Bernard Simmons (born June 27, 1963) is an American former professional baseball outfielder. He attended James Madison High School. He played during three seasons at the Major League Baseball (MLB) for the Detroit Tigers and Baltimore Orioles.

== Career ==
Simmons was drafted by the Tigers in the 2nd round of the 1981 MLB draft. Simmons played his first professional season with their Rookie league Bristol Tigers in 1981, and his last with the Pittsburgh Pirates' Triple-A Calgary Cannons in 1995.

In a 3-year, 100-game MLB career, Simmons posted a .261 batting average (86-for-330) with 38 runs, 11 home runs and 40 RBIs. He finished his career with a .963 fielding percentage playing left and right field.

== Personal life ==
Simmons' son, Josh, plays in the NFL for the Kansas City Chiefs.
