= Shinsuke Okuno =

Japanese politician

- 奥野 信亮
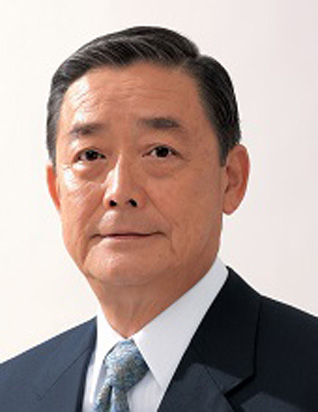
- Official portrait, 2017

Member of the House of Representatives
- In office 16 December 2012 – 9 October 2024
- Preceded by: Masashige Yoshikawa
- Succeeded by: Multi-member district
- Constituency: Nara 3rd (2012–2017); Kinki PR (2017–2024)
- In office 9 November 2003 – 21 July 2009
- Preceded by: Seisuke Okuno
- Succeeded by: Masashige Yoshikawa
- Constituency: Nara 3rd

Personal details
- Born: 5 March 1944 (age 82) Tokyo, Japan
- Party: Liberal Democratic
- Parent: Seisuke Okuno (father)
- Education: Keio University

Shinsuke Okuno (奥野 信亮, Okuno Shinsuke; born 5 March 1944) is a former Japanese politician of the Liberal Democratic Party, who served as a member of the House of Representatives in the Diet (national legislature).

== Early life ==
Okuno is a native of Gose, Nara and a graduate of Keio University.

== Political career ==
Okuno was elected to the House of Representatives for the first time in 2003. He is affiliated to the revisionist lobby Nippon Kaigi.

During his career, Okuno has been elected to the House of Representatives five times for the Kinki proportional seat. He has held roles including State Minister of Justice, Chairperson of the House of Representatives Committee on Judicial Affairs, and Chairperson on the Liberal Democratic Party's Federation of Nara Prefecture branches.

He is affiliated with the Asia-Pacific Parliamentarians' Union, Japan-AU Parliamentary Friendship Association, Japan-India Parliamentary Friendship Association, and the Japan Conference (Nippon Kaigi). His areas of interest include education, economics and finance, and social security.

== Business career ==
Okuno has also served as a board member, executive chairperson, and CEO of a company.
