= Lomita, California =

City in California, United States

- City
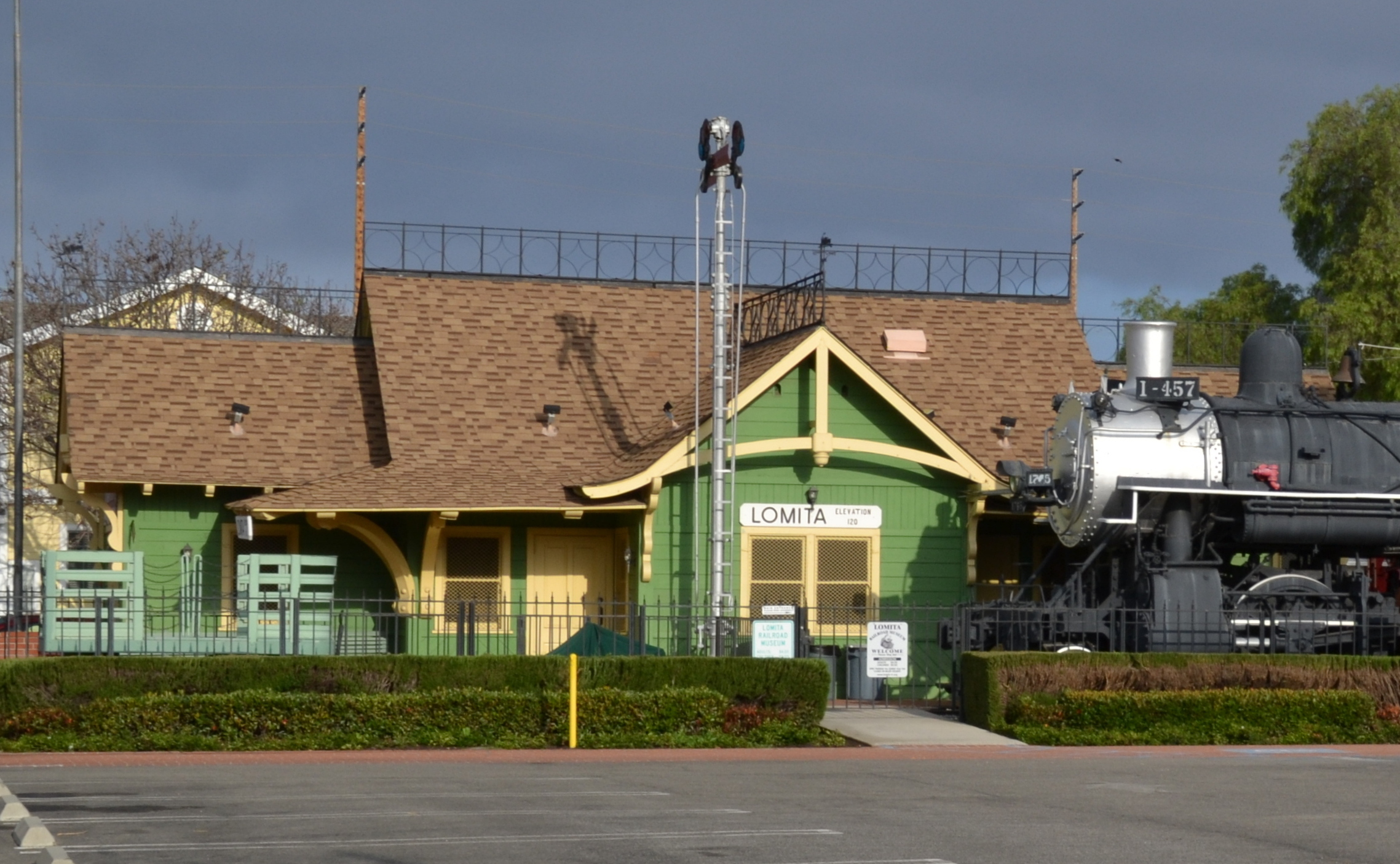
- Lomita Railroad Museum

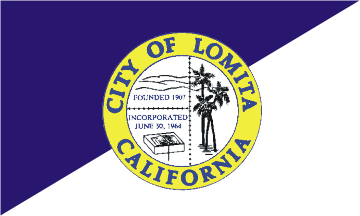
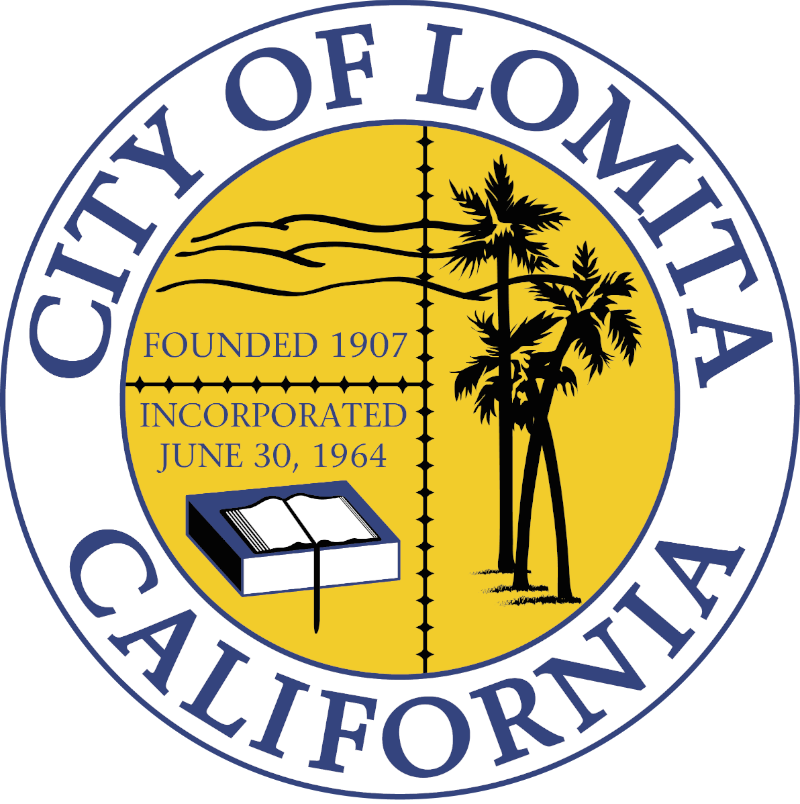
- Flag Seal
- Nickname: "The Friendly City"
- Interactive map of Lomita, California
- Location in the United States
- Coordinates: 33°47′36″N 118°18′58″W
- Country: United States
- State: California
- County: Los Angeles
- Incorporated: June 30, 1964

Government
  - Type: Council-Manager
  - Mayor: Mark A. Waronek
  - Mayor Pro Tem: Cindy Segawa
  - City council: James Gazeley; William Uphoff; Barry Waite
  - City Manager: Andrew Vialpando

Area
  - Total: 1.91 sq mi (4.95 km^{2})
  - Land: 1.91 sq mi (4.95 km^{2})
  - Water: 0 sq mi (0.00 km^{2}) 0%
- Elevation: 95 ft (29 m)

Population (2020)
  - Total: 20,921
  - Density: 10,900/sq mi (4,230/km^{2})
- Time zone: UTC−8 (Pacific)
  - Summer (DST): UTC−7 (PDT)
- ZIP code: 90717
- Area codes: 310/424
- FIPS code: 06-42468
- GNIS feature IDs: 1660937, 2410859
- Website: www.lomitacity.com

Lomita (Spanish for "Little hill") is a city in Los Angeles County, California, United States. The population was 20,921 at the 2020 census, up slightly from 20,256 at the 2010 census.

== History ==
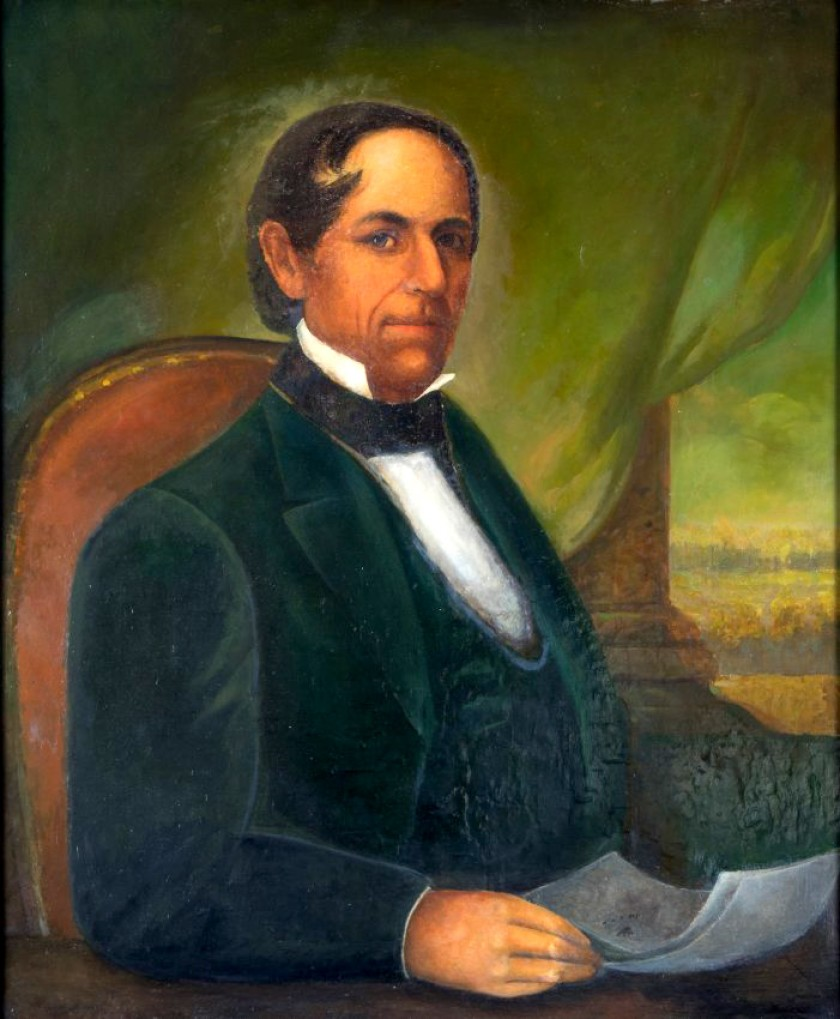
Don Manuel Domínguez, a signer of the Californian Constitution and owner of Rancho San Pedro, which included all of modern-day Lomita.

The Gabrielino were the first to settle in the area.

The Spanish Empire had expanded into this area when the Viceroy of New Spain commissioned Juan Rodríguez Cabrillo to explore the Pacific Ocean in 1542–1543. In 1767, the area became part of the Province of the Californias (Spanish: Provincia de las Californias).

In 1784, the Spanish Crown deeded Rancho San Pedro, a tract of over 75,000 acres (300 km^{2}), to soldier Juan José Domínguez. The rancho changed in size over the years, as Domínguez's descendants partitioned the land amongst family members, sold parcels to newly arriving settlers, or relinquished some when validating their legal claim with the Mexican government in 1828, and with the United States government in 1858. The Domínguez family name is still applied throughout the area, including the Dominguez Rancho Adobe historical landmark, in the unincorporated community of Rancho Dominguez, located northeast of Lomita.

Lomita was incorporated as a city on June 30, 1964, to prevent further annexation by neighboring cities and in an attempt to curtail the development of high-rise apartment buildings.

Lomita established a sister city relationship with Takaishi, Osaka, Japan, in October 1981.

== Geography ==
According to the United States Census Bureau, the city has a total area of 1.9 square miles (4.9 km^{2}), all land.

Lomita originally spanned 7 square miles (18 km^{2}). However, over time, much of this area was annexed by neighboring cities. A notable example is "Lomita Fields", now Zamperini Field (the Torrance Municipal Airport).

=== Climate ===
According to the Köppen Climate Classification system, Lomita has a semi-arid climate, abbreviated "BSk" on climate maps.

Climate data for Lomita, California
Month	Jan	Feb	Mar	Apr	May	Jun	Jul	Aug	Sep	Oct	Nov	Dec	Year
Record high °F (°C)	91 (33)	92 (33)	96 (36)	104 (40)	100 (38)	102 (39)	109 (43)	101 (38)	111 (44)	106 (41)	98 (37)	94 (34)	111 (44)
Mean daily maximum °F (°C)	66.0 (18.9)	66.0 (18.9)	67.0 (19.4)	70.0 (21.1)	71.0 (21.7)	74.0 (23.3)	77.0 (25.0)	78.0 (25.6)	78.0 (25.6)	75.0 (23.9)	70.0 (21.1)	65.0 (18.3)	71.4 (21.9)
Mean daily minimum °F (°C)	46.0 (7.8)	48.0 (8.9)	49.0 (9.4)	51.0 (10.6)	55.0 (12.8)	59.0 (15.0)	62.0 (16.7)	62.0 (16.7)	61.0 (16.1)	57.0 (13.9)	50.0 (10.0)	46.0 (7.8)	53.8 (12.1)
Record low °F (°C)	25 (−4)	27 (−3)	23 (−5)	25 (−4)	38 (3)	36 (2)	34 (1)	44 (7)	36 (2)	28 (−2)	29 (−2)	27 (−3)	23 (−5)
Average precipitation inches (mm)	3.26 (83)	3.91 (99)	2.22 (56)	0.76 (19)	0.22 (5.6)	0.07 (1.8)	0.05 (1.3)	0.02 (0.51)	0.16 (4.1)	0.62 (16)	1.19 (30)	2.09 (53)	14.57 (369.31)
Source: The Weather Channel

== Demographics ==
Historical population
Census	Pop.	Note	%±
1960	14,983		—
1970	19,784		32.0%
1980	18,807		−4.9%
1990	19,382		3.1%
2000	20,046		3.4%
2010	20,256		1.0%
2020	20,921		3.3%
U.S. Decennial Census; 1860–1870 1880-1890; 1900 1910 1920; 1930 1940 1950; 1960 1970 1980; 1990 2000 2010; 2020

Lomita was first listed as an unincorporated place in the 1960 U.S. census as part of the Palos Verdes census community division; and as a city in the 1970 U.S. census.

=== Racial and ethnic composition ===
Lomita city, California – Racial and ethnic composition Note: the US Census treats Hispanic/Latino as an ethnic category. This table excludes Latinos from the racial categories and assigns them to a separate category. Hispanics/Latinos may be of any race.
Race / Ethnicity (NH = Non-Hispanic)	Pop 1980	Pop 1990	Pop 2000	Pop 2010	Pop 2020	% 1980	% 1990	% 2000	% 2010	% 2020
White alone (NH)	14,614	13,273	10,735	8,797	7,269	77.71%	68.48%	53.55%	43.43%	34.74%
Black or African American alone (NH)	177	532	821	964	1,129	0.94%	2.74%	4.10%	4.76%	5.40%
Native American or Alaska Native alone (NH)	142	120	92	76	57	0.76%	0.62%	0.46%	0.38%	0.27%
Asian alone (NH)	949	1,665	2,241	2,850	3,456	5.05%	8.59%	11.18%	14.07%	16.42%
Native Hawaiian or Pacific Islander alone (NH)	949	1,665	102	112	128	5.05%	8.59%	0.51%	0.55%	0.61%
Other race alone (NH)	19	36	44	60	133	0.10%	0.19%	0.22%	0.30%	0.64%
Mixed race or Multiracial (NH)	x	x	759	745	1,078	x	x	3.79%	3.68%	5.15%
Hispanic or Latino (any race)	2,906	3,756	5,252	6,652	7,691	15.45%	19.38%	26.20%	32.84%	36.76%
Total	18,807	19,382	20,046	20,256	20,921	100.00%	100.00%	100.00%	100.00%	100.00%

=== 2020 census ===
As of the 2020 census, Lomita had a population of 20,921. The population density was 10,941.9 inhabitants per square mile (4,224.7/km^{2}). The median age was 41.3 years. 19.0% of residents were under the age of 18 and 17.6% were 65 years of age or older. For every 100 females, there were 91.1 males, and for every 100 females age 18 and over, there were 88.7 males.

The census reported that 99.2% of the population lived in households, 0.3% lived in non-institutionalized group quarters, and 0.5% were institutionalized. 100.0% of residents lived in urban areas, while 0.0% lived in rural areas.

There were 8,273 households, out of which 29.2% included children under the age of 18, 42.2% were married-couple households, 6.6% were cohabiting couple households, 32.1% had a female householder with no partner present, and 19.1% had a male householder with no partner present. About 28.0% of households were one person households, and 12.3% had someone living alone who was 65 years of age or older. The average household size was 2.51. There were 5,340 families (64.5% of all households).

There were 8,593 housing units, of which 8,273 (96.3%) were occupied. Of occupied housing units, 44.6% were owner-occupied and 55.4% were occupied by renters. The homeowner vacancy rate was 0.9%, and the rental vacancy rate was 2.8%.

=== 2023 ACS estimates ===
In 2023, the US Census Bureau estimated that the median household income was $92,920, and the per capita income was $44,522. About 6.0% of families and 12.2% of the population were below the poverty line.

=== 2010 census ===
At the 2010 census Lomita had a population of 20,256. The population density was 10,601.3 inhabitants per square mile (4,093.2/km^{2}). The racial makeup of Lomita was 11,987 (59.2%) White (43.4% Non-Hispanic White), 1,075 (5.3%) African American, 174 (0.9%) Native American, 2,923 (14.4%) Asian, 140 (0.7%) Pacific Islander, 2,680 (13.2%) from other races, and 1,277 (6.3%) from two or more races. Hispanic or Latino of any race were 6,652 persons (32.8%).

The census reported that 20,089 people (99.2% of the population) lived in households, 57 (0.3%) lived in non-institutionalized group quarters, and 110 (0.5%) were institutionalized.

There were 8,068 households, 2,479 (30.7%) had children under the age of 18 living in them, 3,409 (42.3%) were opposite-sex married couples living together, 1,160 (14.4%) had a female householder with no husband present, 481 (6.0%) had a male householder with no wife present. There were 491 (6.1%) unmarried opposite-sex partnerships, and 55 (0.7%) same-sex married couples or partnerships. 2,420 households (30.0%) were one person and 822 (10.2%) had someone living alone who was 65 or older. The average household size was 2.49. There were 5,050 families (62.6% of households); the average family size was 3.12.

The age distribution was 4,378 people (21.6%) under the age of 18, 1,743 people (8.6%) aged 18 to 24, 5,699 people (28.1%) aged 25 to 44, 5,904 people (29.1%) aged 45 to 64, and 2,532 people (12.5%) who were 65 or older. The median age was 39.6 years. For every 100 females, there were 93.3 males. For every 100 females age 18 and over, there were 89.8 males.

There were 8,412 housing units at an average density of 4,402.5 per square mile, of the occupied units 3,738 (46.3%) were owner-occupied and 4,330 (53.7%) were rented. The homeowner vacancy rate was 0.7%; the rental vacancy rate was 3.4%. 9,183 people (45.3% of the population) lived in owner-occupied housing units and 10,906 people (53.8%) lived in rental housing units.

According to the 2010 United States Census, Lomita had a median household income of $60,398, with 12.2% of the population living below the federal poverty line.

=== Mapping L.A. ===
Mapping L.A. reported that in 2000, Mexican (19.4%) and German (10.3%) were the most common ancestries. Mexico (35.0%) and Korea (11.2%) were the most common foreign places of birth.

== Government and infrastructure ==
Lomita is a general law city with a council-manager form of government. Five council members are elected by district for four year terms, who then appoint a City Manager. Every year the council members elect a mayor from amongst them, who mostly serves as chairperson for meetings and as a city figurehead.

Municipal services not already provided by the city are generally contracted out to Los Angeles County:

Fire protection in Lomita is provided by the Los Angeles County Fire Department with ambulance transport by McCormick Ambulance.

The Los Angeles County Sheriff's Department (LASD) provides law enforcement and operates the Lomita Station. The city also has an in-house Community Safety Division to handle non-urgent and non-violent incidents and enforce the Municipal Code.

The Los Angeles County Department of Health Services operates the Torrance Health Center in Harbor Gateway, Los Angeles, near Torrance and serving Lomita.

In the California State Legislature, Lomita is in the 24th senatorial district, represented by Democrat Ben Allen, and in the 66th Assembly district, represented by Democrat Al Muratsuchi.

In the United States House of Representatives, Lomita is in California's 36th congressional district, represented by Democrat Ted Lieu.

The United States Postal Service Lomita Post Office is located at 25131 Narbonne Avenue.

== Politics ==
The city of Lomita supported the Republican candidates for president in 1984 and 1988, but has since become a predominantly Democratic city. The city of Lomita has supported the Democratic candidate in the past seven consecutive presidential elections. In every presidential elections since 1984, with the exception of 2024, the percentage of the vote received by the Democrat has increased from the previous election.

Lomita city vote by party in presidential elections
Year	Democratic		Republican		Third parties	
2024	53.72%	4,672	42.45%	3,692	3.83%	333
2020	58.46%	5,823	38.86%	3,871	2.68%	267
2016	55.93%	4,529	37.67%	3,050	6.40%	518
2012	55.43%	4,352	41.67%	3,272	2.90%	228
2008	54.41%	4,433	43.26%	3,525	2.33%	190
2004	50.77%	3,106	48.07%	2,941	1.16%	71
2000	49.13%	2,775	45.79%	2,586	5.08%	287
1996	44.62%	2,573	40.38%	2,329	15.00%	865
1992	39.47%	2,575	34.15%	2,228	26.38%	1,721
1988	38.44%	2,496	60.10%	3,902	1.46%	95
1984	30.20%	1,927	68.45%	4,367	1.35%	86
1980	31.08%	1,892	59.38%	3,615	9.54%	581
1976	46.33%	2,721	51.27%	3,011	2.40%	141
1972	35.04%	2,505	60.51%	4,325	4.45%	318

== Landmarks ==
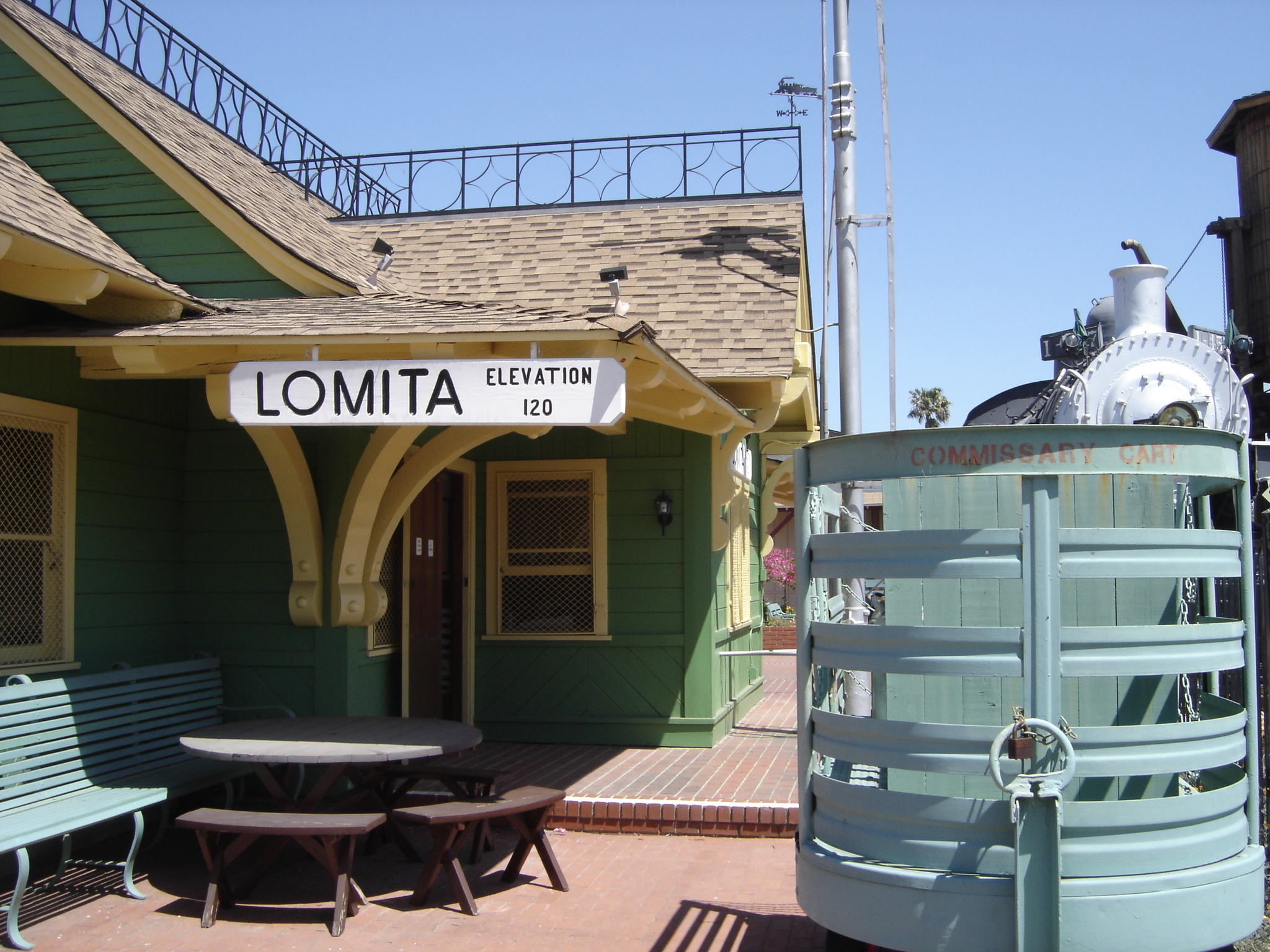
Lomita Railroad Museum

- Lomita Railroad Museum, opened in 1966 by Irene Lewis, is a small museum in Lomita devoted to the steam-engine period of railroading. Mrs. Lewis, along with her husband Martin, operated "Little Engines of Lomita", which sold kits for live steam-engine locomotives. Her engines also appeared in movies, including "The Greatest Show on Earth" (1952) and "Von Ryans Express" (1965). This operation inspired Mrs. Lewis to earn a mechanical engineering degree late in life and to build the museum as a showplace for her products. When built, the museum was the first of its kind West of Denver. The museum was designed to replicate the Boston & Maine's Greenwood Station in Wakefield, Massachusetts. The Museum was donated by Mrs. Lewis to the City of Lomita in honor of her late husband, Martin Lewis, in 1967. On display are a 1901 Baldwin Locomotive, a whaleback Southern Pacific tender, a 1910 Union Pacific caboose, and a 1949 Santa Fe caboose. The Museum also houses a full-size replica of a 1920s water tower that was constructed in 2000. The museum also incorporates a small public park, which accommodates a 1913 Union Pacific boxcar and a 1923 Union Oil tank car. The Museum is open Friday through Sunday, from 10 AM to 5 PM. Mrs. Lewis's little engines were featured on a Lawrence Welk show saluting senior citizens. Mary Lou Metzger operated the train, and a song about railroading.

== Education ==
Lomita residents are served by the Los Angeles Unified School District (LAUSD). The area is within Board District 7. As of 2008, Dr. Richard Vladovic represented the district.

Elementary schools that serve Lomita include:

- Eshelman Avenue Elementary School
- Lomita Math/Science Magnet (Kindergarten zoned only - 1-5 is magnet only)
- President Avenue Elementary School (1–5) (in Los Angeles)

For a two-year period prior to 1991 Lomita attempted to secede from the LAUSD, but by that year abandoned its efforts.

Nishiyamato Academy of California, a Japanese elementary and junior high school, is located in Lomita. The school opened in April 1993; at the time it was located in Rolling Hills Estates. It was founded by Ryotaro Tanose, a former Japanese Diet member, as a sister school of the Nishiyamato Gakuen Junior and Senior High School (Nishiyamato Academy) in Kawai, Nara Prefecture, Japan.

== Notable people ==
- Ted Lilly, Los Angeles Dodgers pitcher
- Nikki Hornsby, musician
- Deane McMinn, figure skating judge and USFS team manager, killed in the crash of Sabena Flight 548
- Erv Palica, Major league pitcher, born to Montenegrin Serb parents
- Chad Qualls, Colorado Rockies pitcher
- Jim Thorpe, Native American athlete
- Edward O. Thorp, mathematics professor, author, hedge fund manager, and blackjack player
- Milo Aukerman, musician
- Jacob Wysocki, Comedian and actor
- Jeremy Klein, professional skateboarder
