= Asahi Gakuen =

Supplementary Japanese school in the United States

Coordinates: 34.0477774°N 118.2441152°W

- あさひ学園

Location
- HQ: 19191 S. Vermont Ave., #660 Torrance, CA (postal address) 90502 Santa Monica Campus: Daniel Webster MS, 11330 W. Graham Place, Los Angeles, CA 90064 Torrance Campus: South Torrance HS, 4801 Pacific Coast Highway, Torrance, CA 90505 San Gabriel Campus: South El Monte HS, 1001 N. Durfee Ave., South El Monte, CA 91733 Orange Campus: La Quinta High School, 10372 McFadden Ave., Westminster, California; United States

Information
- Type: Supplementary Japanese school
- Grades: PreK-12
- Website: asahigakuen.com

Asahi Gakuen, (Note: (あさひ学園 "School of the Rising Sun")) or the Los Angeles Japanese School, (Note: (ロス・アンジェルス補習授業校 Rosu Anjerusu Hoshū Jugyō Kō)) is a part-time Japanese school in the Los Angeles metropolitan area. The school was founded by the Association for the Promotion of Japanese Language Education in Los Angeles. In 1988, the school had 2,500 students. The school teaches the Japanese language, science, social sciences, and mathematics. As of 1987 the school teaches all four aspects in each school day. The Japan Business Association of Southern California, (Note: (JBA, 南カリフォルニア日系企業協会 Minami Kariforunia Nikkei Kigyō Kyōkai)) previously known as The Japan Traders' Club of Los Angeles, (Note: (日本貿易懇話会 Nihon Bōeki Konwa-kai)) as of 1997 financially supports the school.

== History ==
Asahi Gakuen was founded in 1969. At the time it had one campus and 68 students. By 1986 there were 2,400 students on four campuses.

Prior to 1978, the school took some San Diego residents; that year the Minato School opened in that city.

== Locations ==
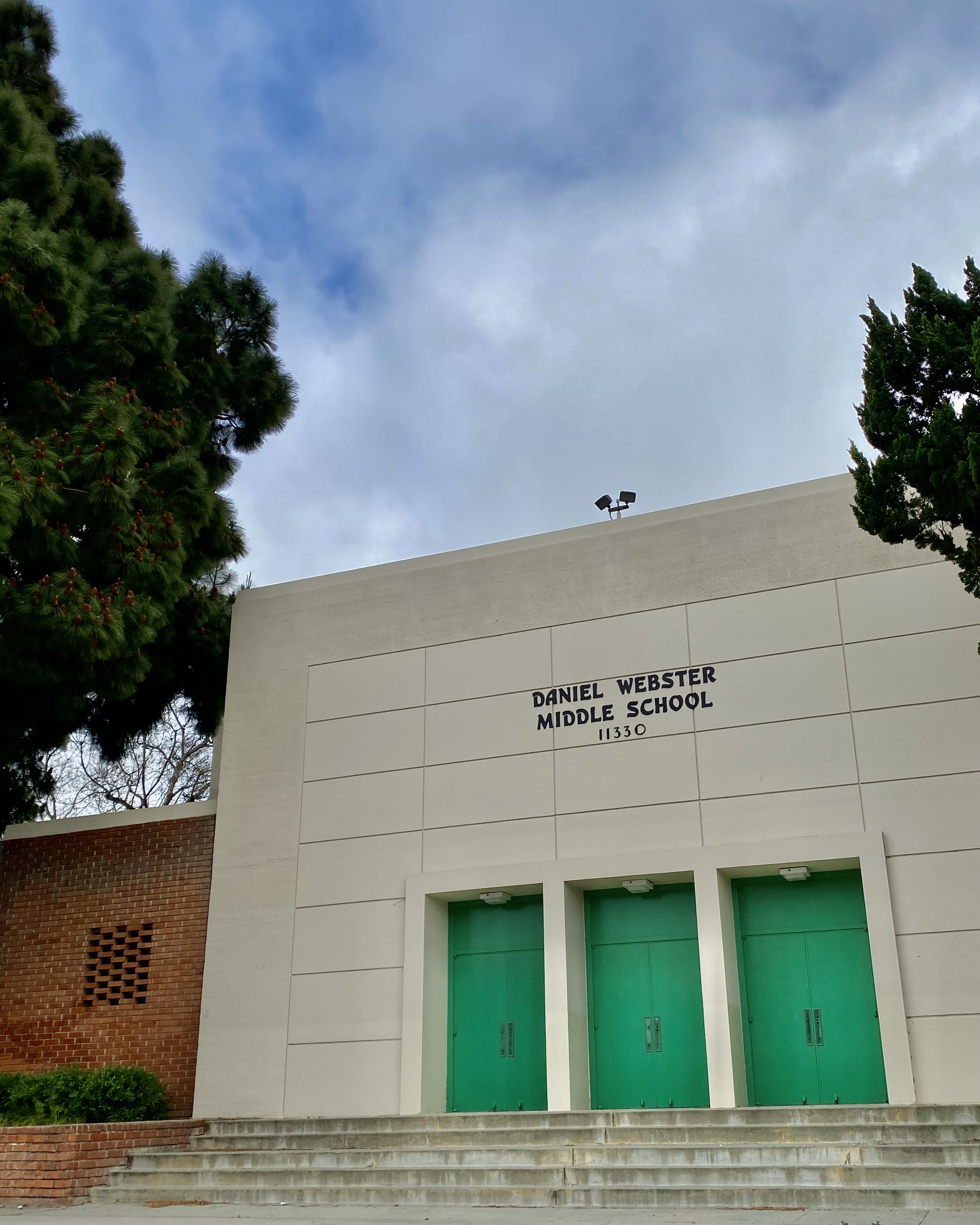
Daniel Webster Middle School, the Westside class location

The school's main office is in Harbor Gateway, Los Angeles, with a Torrance address. Previously it was in Room 308 on the third floor of the Japanese American Cultural & Community Center (JACCC) (Note: 日米文化会館 Nichibei Bunka Kaikan)) building, located in Little Tokyo, Los Angeles.

Classes are held at the Orange Campus at La Quinta High School in Westminster, the San Gabriel campus at South El Monte High School in South El Monte, the Santa Monica Campus at Daniel Webster Middle School in Sawtelle, and the Torrance campus at South Torrance High School in Torrance.

As of 2018, three campuses (Santa Monica, Orange, and Torrance) have high school classes. Previously all high school classes were held at the Santa Monica campus. As of 1986 students took buses from as far away as Orange County to go to the high school campus.

In 1986-1987, the school had students in four campuses, including one in Pasadena, one in Garden Grove, one at Daniel Webster Middle, and one at South Torrance High. In 1997, Asahi Gakuen had five branch schools in Los Angeles County and Orange County.

The Torrance campus opened in 1980 with 400 students. In 1987, the Torrance campus had 773 students.

The Orange campus was previously at Santiago High School in Garden Grove, and at Bolsa Grande High School in Garden Grove.

Campuses

== Operations ==
The school year uses the Japanese schedule from April until March, with classes held from 9:00 AM until 3:30 PM during Saturdays.

The school uses tuition to pay for the textbooks it orders from Japan. As of 1986, each student in grades 1-9 has tuition of $49.50 ($145.39 when accounting for inflation) each month, while each high school student has tuition of $67.50 ($198.26 when accounting for inflation) monthly. In 1987 the school had a registration fee of up to $150 ($425.09 when accounting for inflation) and an annual tuition of fewer than $600 ($1700.35 accounting for inflation).

All campuses, as of 1986, have libraries. Fatsuko [sic] Fujita, the West Los Angeles campus librarian, stated that her campus permitted loaning of 5,000 of its books.

== Curriculum ==
In 1986, Kimiko Lin, the assistant principal of the West Los Angeles campus, stated that the school puts its emphasis on classwork instead of homework to avoid overburdening students who have other commitments; therefore, the school sometimes gives homework. However, in recent years, the homework level has increased significantly given a week's curriculum in Japan is covered in one day of class on Saturday and through homework and self study.

== Employees ==
As of 1987, Asahi Gakuen had 47 faculty members. The school's administrators are visiting employees from Japan, credentialed by The Ministry of Education of Japan (Monbusho). The ministry recommends which employees come to teach at Asahi Gakuen.

== Student body ==
In 1986 Hiroshi Matsuoka, the Japan Business Association of Southern California executive director, stated that 85% of the about 3,500 Japanese nationals working for Japanese companies in the Los Angeles metropolitan area sent children to Asahi Gakuen.

== See also ==
- History of the Japanese in Los Angeles
- International Bilingual School
- Rafu Shimpo
- Japanese language education in the United States
