= International Bilingual School =

Coordinates: 33.8016°N 118.3966°W

Location
- 300-B Paseo Del Mar; Palos Verdes Estates, US, California

Information
- Established: 1979
- Founder: Tadao Hara

The International Bilingual School (ロサンゼルス国際学園, Rosanzerusu Kokusai Gakuen; "Los Angeles International Academy", IBS), later International School of Los Angeles (ISLA), was an international bilingual day school in Palos Verdes Estates, California, in the Los Angeles metropolitan area, serving students in Kindergarten through grade 9. It was founded by Tadao Hara. The school later relocated to nearby Torrance.

== History ==
The school opened in Torrance in 1979. At the time, there were six students. The school was founded to educate children of Japanese nationals working for companies such as Honda and Toyota.

During its first year, the school had 48 students. At a later point, it moved to Hermosa Beach. In the fall of 1988 the school moved to a new building with 21 classrooms. The previous school building had 14 classrooms. As of 1989 the school had 269 students. The school moved to the former Malaga Cove Elementary School in Palos Verdes Estates in 1992. The school leased half of the building, which was still owned by the Palos Verdes Peninsula Unified School District. This building also housed the Rolling Hills Preparatory School and the Rancho de Los Palos Verdes Historical Society Museum.

In 1994 the school had 175 students. By 1994 the school's enrollment had declined due to an economic decline in Japan. Hara stated that he had a plan where he would arrange to have 30 to 40 students resident in Japan each take one semester at the school, live with American host families in the South Bay, and gain exposure to the English language and American culture. This plan was to be in cooperation with Japanese high schools.

By 2002 the Palos Verdes Peninsula school district had filed suit to force the International Bilingual School to leave the school property. The school moved to a site in Torrance.

== Curriculum ==
The school curriculum was based on guidelines set by the Japanese Ministry of Education (Monbusho). The school had nursery, elementary, and junior high divisions. As of 1987, and as of 1994 the school gave 210 days of instruction to students. As of 1987, California public schools typically gave 180 days of instruction, and as of 1994 most public schools in the United States gave 180 days of instruction. Watanabe stated that the length of the school year is needed to accommodate the Japanese curriculum. The school held classes five days per week, with elementary students attending from 8:30 AM to 2 PM and with junior high school students attending from 8:30 AM to 4 PM. In addition, as of 1994 students attended school on the first Saturday of each month. Like Japanese schools, the academic year began in April, and ended in March. It used a trimester system.

Classes were taught in the Japanese language. The school offered an English language grammar course taught in the English teaching manner used in Japan and an English as a second language course. Students also learned about American culture and customs. The school required its students to take gymnastics, and students took calligraphy and music classes.

Watanabe stated that the students gained admission to quality Japanese high schools.

== Operations ==
The tuition, as of 1992, was $330 ($757.11 with inflation) to $430 ($986.54 with inflation) monthly. The annual tuition, as of 1994, was from $5,000 ($10861.02 with inflation) to $5,800 ($12598.79 with inflation). The tuition per month in 1994 was $405 ($879.74 with inflation) to $470 ($1020.94 with inflation).

== Student and teacher demographics ==
In 1994, according to Takatsugu "Tak" Watanabe, the school business manager, there were 175 students. Watanabe stated that 95% were Japanese nationals with the remainder being White (Caucasian Americans), African Americans, and those of mixed races. That year, Watanabe stated that many of the Japanese students were children of workers assigned to Los Angeles-area offices of Japanese companies. In 1989 Takatsugu stated that 90% of the students have parents who are Japanese executives. In 1994 Tadao Hara stated that most of the Japanese parents were on three to five year assignments, after which they would return to Japan. As of that year, the maximum class size is 15.

As of 1992, there were 14 full-time teachers and 12 part-time teachers. As of 1994, there were 28 teachers, including those working full-time and those working part-time. As of 1992, The Japanese Ministry of Education trained and certified all of the teachers. As of 1994, most teachers spoke Japanese and English.

== Extracurricular activities ==
As of 1994, ninth graders took trips to the United States East Coast. Hara stated that the students visited historic sites in New York City, Philadelphia, Boston, and Washington, DC. According to Hara, within Washington DC the students visited included the United States Capitol, the White House, and the Embassy of Japan in the United States. In addition, Hara stated that students watched Broadway plays.

== See also ==
- History of the Japanese in Los Angeles
- Asahi Gakuen
- Rafu Shimpo
- Japanese language education in the United States
- American School in Japan, American international school in Tokyo
