= James Madison High School (California) =

Public high school in San Diego, California, United States

Madison High School
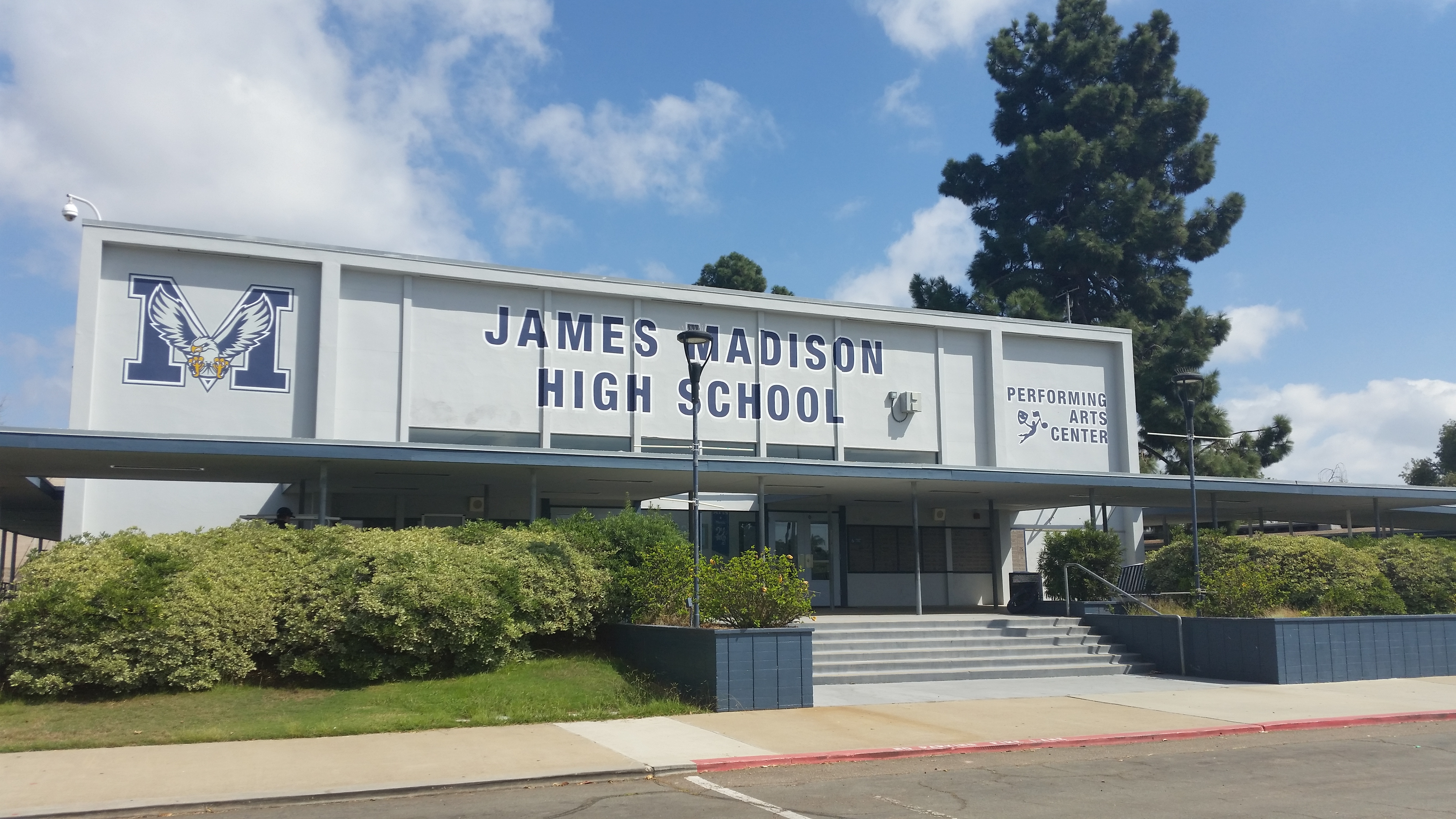

Location
- 4833 Doliva Dr. San Diego, California; United States

Information
- Type: Public
- School district: San Diego Unified School District
- Grades: 9-12
- Enrollment: 848 (2023-2024)
- Website: madison.sandiegounified.org

James Madison High School is a public secondary school in San Diego, California. It is part of San Diego Unified School District. Madison's 50-acre (200,000 m^{2}) campus opened in 1962. Serving almost 1,100 students in grades 9–12, it is located in the Clairemont Mesa East neighborhood, north of Balboa Ave, south of Clairemont Mesa Blvd, and west of Interstate 805.

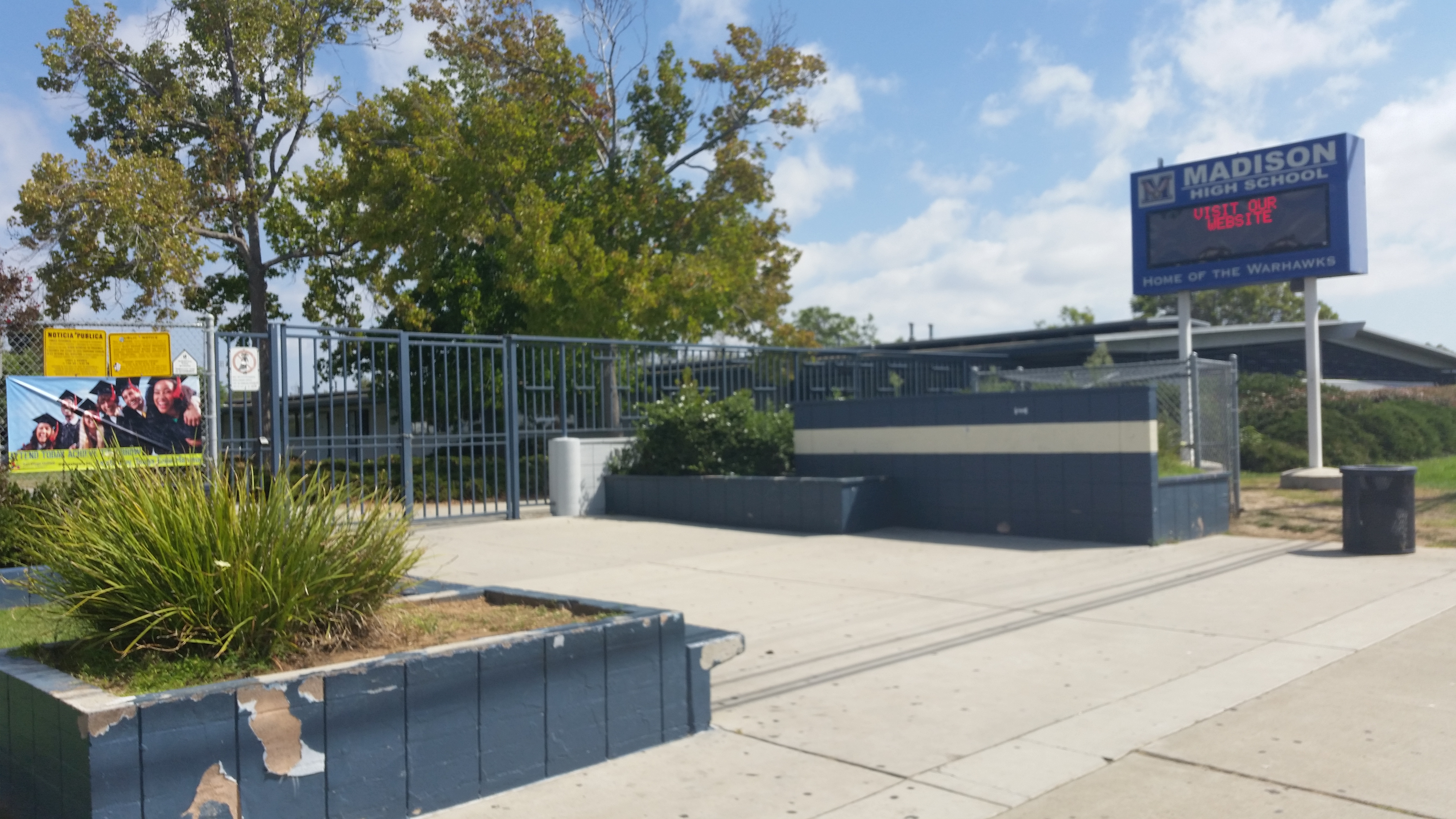
Marquis on the west side of James Madison High School seen from the north

== Campus use ==
In 2015, Minato School, a weekend Japanese school, began using Madison High to hold classes.

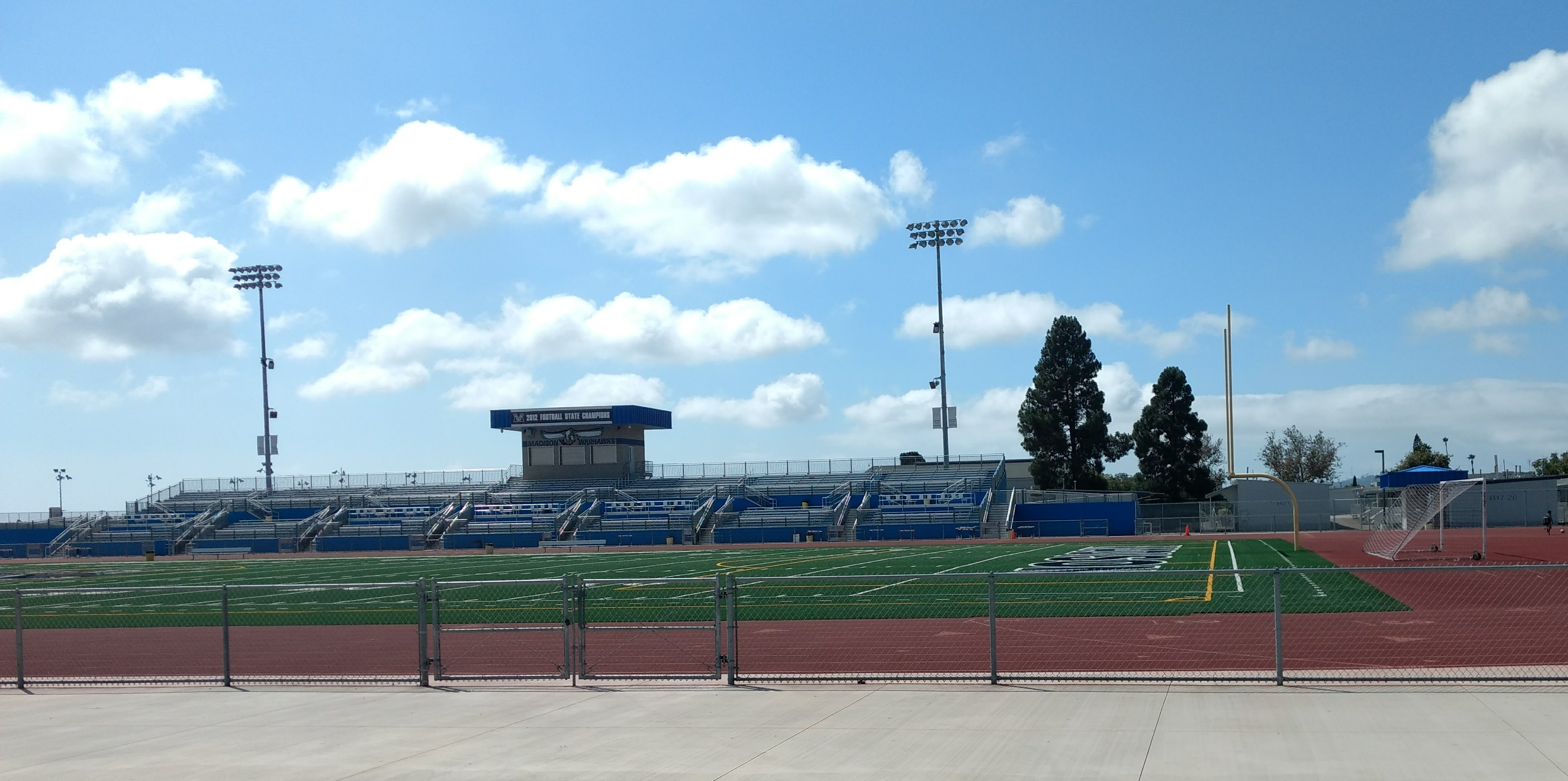
James Madison High School Stadium

== Notable alumni ==
- Ian Clarkin (Class of 2013), professional baseball player (Chicago White Sox)
- Al Fitzmorris, Major League Baseball pitcher for the Kansas City Royals in the 1970s.
- Major Garrett, Chief White House correspondent for CBS News.
- Todd Gloria, San Diego mayor.
- Mike Martz (Class of 1969), former NFL head coach (St. Louis), former offensive coordinator (Chicago Bears), now TV sports analyst.
- Shawn Nelson, perpetrator of the 1995 San Diego tank rampage.
- Chris Riley (Class of 1991), professional golfer, PGA Tour
- Robbie Rouse (Class of 2009), collegiate football player, all-time leading rusher for California State University Fresno.
- Lori Saldaña (Class of 1976), Democratic politician, former member of California State Assembly
- Nelson Simmons, Major League Baseball player in the 1980s.
- Scott Simpson (Class of 1973), professional golfer, winner of the 1987 U.S. Open
- Rich Tylski, NFL offensive lineman.
- David Westerfield, convicted murderer of Danielle van Dam (high-profile murder in San Diego, 2002).
