= Ryotaro Tanose =

Japanese politician

- 田野瀬 良太郎
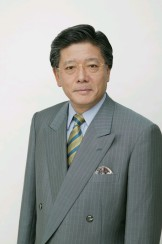
- Official portrait, 2004

Member of the House of Representatives
- In office 19 July 1993 – 16 November 2012
- Preceded by: Multi-member district
- Succeeded by: Taidō Tanose
- Constituency: Nara at-large (1993–1996); Kinki PR (1996–2000); Nara 4th (2000–2012)

Member of the Nara Prefectural Assembly
- In office 1983–1991
- Constituency: Gojō City

Member of the Gojō City Council
- In office 1973–1981

Personal details
- Born: 31 October 1943 (age 82) Gojō, Nara, Japan
- Party: Liberal Democratic
- Children: Taidō Tanose
- Education: Nagoya Institute of Technology

Ryotaro Tanose (田野瀬 良太郎, Tanose Ryōtarō; born 31 October 1943) is a retired Japanese politician of the Liberal Democratic Party, who served as a member of the House of Representatives in the Diet (national legislature).

== Early life ==
Tahoe’s is a native of Gojō, Nara and graduated from the Nagoya Institute of Technology.

== Political career ==
Tanose served in the city assembly of Gojo for two terms from 1973 and the assembly of Nara Prefecture for two terms from 1983.

After an unsuccessful run in 1990, he was elected to the House of Representatives for the first time in 1993. He served in the House of Representatives until 2012, first as the Nara at-large representative, and then as the Kinki proportional representation member, and the representative of the Nara 4th electorate.

== Education career ==
Tanose founded Nishiyamato Gakuen Junior High School and High School and the Nishiyamato Academy of California.
