= Nishiyamato Gakuen Junior High School and High School =

- 西大和学園中学校・高等学校

Location
- 295 Kusurii; Kawai, Nara; Japan
- 34°35′17″N 135°42′50″E

Information
- Type: Private, boarding and day
- Motto: 探究・誠実・気迫 (Study, Sincerity and Spirit)
- Established: 1985
- Founder: Ryotaro Tanose
- Sister school: Nishiyamato Academy of California
- Academy and Junior High School Principal: Yoshihisa Kamimura
- Faculty: 102
- Employees: 12
- Grades: 7 to 12
- Gender: Coeducational
- Enrollment: 1,608 total 138 boarding 1,470 day
- Average class size: 40
- Student to teacher ratio: 15.8:1
- Language: English and Japanese
- Campus type: Suburban
- Color
- Athletics: 10 Interscholastic sports
- Website: www.nishiyamato.ed.jp/en/

Nishiyamato Gakuen Junior High School and High School (西大和学園中学校・高等学校, Nishiyamato gakuen chūgakkō kōtōgakkō) is a private junior and senior high school for boarding and day students in grades 7–12. It is a co-educational college preparatory school, with approximately 1,600 students. The school consists of a junior high school and a senior high school, both located in Kawai, Kitakatsuragi District, Nara Prefecture, Japan, 26 kilometres (16 miles) southeast of Osaka.

== Overview ==
As of 2014, the principal of the Academy and the Junior High School is Yoshihisa Kamimura, while the principal of the High School is Shiro Fukui.

Nishiyamato Academy of California, a Japanese elementary and junior high school for day and Saturday students in Lomita, California in the Los Angeles metropolitan area, was founded by Ryotaro Tanose, a Japanese Diet member, as a branch of the Nishiyamato Gakuen.

Yamato University (大和大学 Yamato daigaku) is affiliated with the school.

== Facilities ==
=== Dormitory ===
The school has one dormitory, Seiun-ryo (青雲寮, Seiun ryō). It has eight rooms for junior high school students, with eight students per room. It has 19 rooms for high school students, with each room having four students. As of 2012, there were 118 students in the dormitory. Of them, 30% came from the Chubu region, 29% came from the Kansai region, 17% came from the Chugoku region and Shikoku, 11% came from Kanto region, 5% came from Kyushu and Okinawa Prefecture, and 2% came from Hokkaido and the Tohoku region. The remaining 6% are returnees from overseas places. Seiun-ryo opened in 1992.

== Notable alumni ==
- Hodaka Maruyama, politician
- Kei Satō, politician
