= Nisei Week =

Annual festival celebrating Japanese American culture and history

Nisei Week and Nisei Week Foundation's logo

Nisei Week (二世週祭, Nisei-shū Matsuri) is an annual festival celebrating Japanese American (JA) culture and history in Little Tokyo, Los Angeles. Nisei means 2nd generation in Japanese, describing the first American born Japanese, a group which the seven-day festival was originally meant to attract. Though named for the Nisei generation, Nisei Week is no longer targeted at Niseis, nor is the festival still contained within a week. Nisei Week Foundation president for 2006, Michelle Suzuki, described the festival as "the opportunity for people of all backgrounds to celebrate Japanese heritage and culture".

Festivities are held over one month, though the main attractions are held during the primary two weekends of the festival in mid-August. Nisei Week draws tens of thousands of participants each year from both the Japanese community and Southern California area, mostly to its Grand Parade and specialized festivals. The 80th Annual Nisei Week Festival & the Grand Parade were to take place in August 2020. The 12th Annual Tanabata Festival was to be held in Little Tokyo in mid-August 2020, but all of which were cancelled & deferred to 2022.

== History and cultural analysis ==
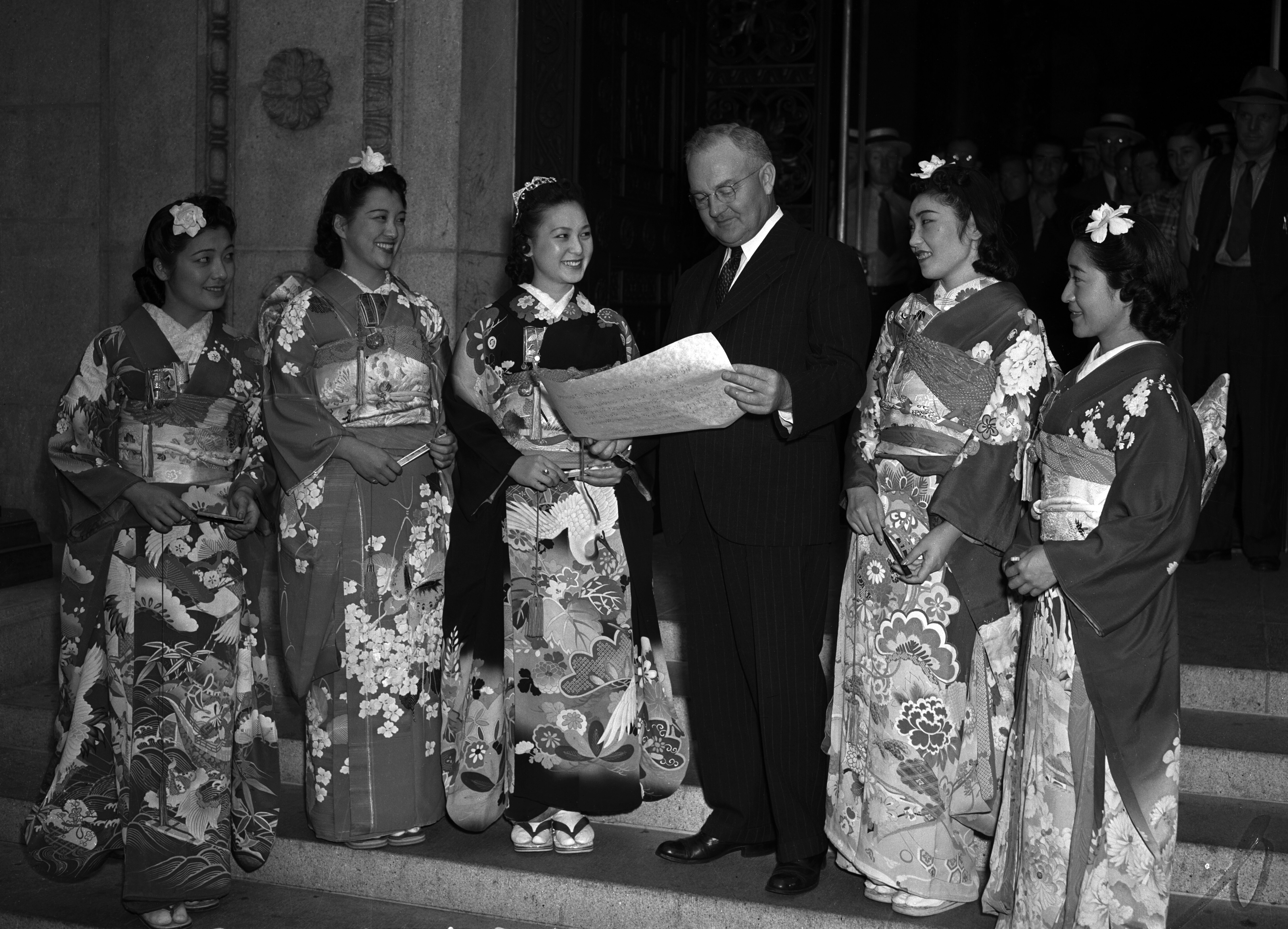
Los Angeles Mayor Fletcher Bowron attending Nisei Week in 1940

Nisei Week's history began during the financially difficult era of the Great Depression — Issei, first generation Japanese immigrants, were growing too old and the Gentlemen's Agreement prohibited new Japanese immigration. The English speaking Nisei became a sought after potential revenue source to support Little Tokyo businesses dominated by Issei. With Little Tokyo falling into stagnation, Nisei week was a celebration intended to attract Niseis and to help generate more youthful exuberance in the district.

Mihiko Shimizu, original inventor of the festival, and other Issei business owners vied for an alliance with the Nisei run Japanese American Citizens League (JACL) to promote the festival. However, the possibility of being labelled as anti-American by anti-Japanese groups remained a concern, due to the collaboration of the two generations (American citizens and Japanese nationals) and cultural overtones of the festival. The Issei business owners decided to hand over all aspects of the celebration to the independent JACL to settle the problem. The first festival was held August 13, 1934, founded by the JACL.

Beyond economic reasons, Nisei Week was created to promote "ethnic solidarity". Utilizing Nisei Week's cultural environment, by centering it in the heart of Little Tokyo and holding cultural events, Issei hoped to bring Nisei back into the cultural fold of the older generation. Issei also hoped for Nisei to become brokers between Little Tokyo and the dominant society around it. The creation of the Nisei Week Queen, one year after the first Nisei Week in 1935, may be seen as the epitome of cultural mediation and broker between the Japanese community and white America. Mike Haigwara, Nisei Week's 2007 Street Arts and Carnival director, attributes Nisei Week with helping foster Japanese American identity and self-esteem.

Japanese internment presented another tumultuous and racially charged period for Nisei Week and the greater Japanese community. Executive Order 9066 was initiated in 1942, relocating and confining Japanese Americans to internment camps, including those running Nisei Week. The festival has been running continuously, except the years during and immediately after internment. Nisei Week celebrated its 50th anniversary in 1990, shifted from 6 years of inactivity during the WWII era. Despite obstacles, Nisei Week is the longest running Japanese festival in California, celebrating its 80th birthday in 2020.

Retrospectively, the celebration was seen by Time Magazine as dual reminder: "Unofficially, it recalls an ugly footnote to American history: the World War II evacuation and internment of more than 110,000 West Coast Japanese, most of them native-born U.S. citizens." Lon Kurashige, professor of ethnic studies at USC, proposes that the lingering effects of internment changed Nisei Week's cultural tones and affiliations, in part due to the weakening role of men during the internment period, which again shifted during and after the civil rights period.

Phillip Morris' first promotional event targeted at Asian and Pacific Islander American community events was staged at Nisei Week. The event was part of a larger "PULL strategy" program, which included marketing to increase brand recognition among Asians. A Marlboro booth provided samples and attempted to attract consumers by displaying a McLaren MP4/4 show car (Marlboro sponsored McLaren's F1 team at the time) at the 1988 Nisei Week festival.

In 1982, businesswoman Frances Hashimoto became the first woman to chair the Nisei Week festival.

"Aki the Akita", Nisei Week's official mascot, was created by renowned mascot artist Dick Sakahara in 1997 for Nisei Week's now defunct Dog Show . Aki appears as a costumed character to greet and entertain children, or in cartoon form as a symbol for the festival.

Nisei Week wasn't held between 1942 & 1945 nor 2020; the latter year saw a virtual festival.

== Festivities ==
Nisei Week has many attractions and exhibitions, which change annually, though many traditions remain each year.

=== Nisei Week Grand Parade ===
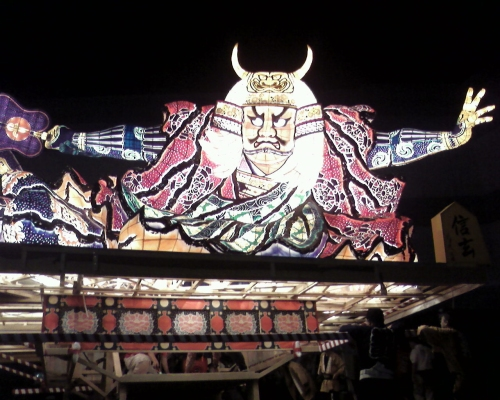
LA Nebuta, the final float at the 2007 Nisei Week parade

The Nisei Week Parade takes place on the primary Sunday of Nisei Week. The parade features many varied participants, mostly from Southern California and Japan, including the following: local high school marching bands, ondo dancing groups, martial art dojos, elected parade marshals (usually celebrities or community heroes), Japanese and local politicians (such as the Mayor of Los Angeles), a mikoshi shrine, floats, pageant queens, taiko players, etc. Spanning several hours, the Nisei Week Parade lasts long due to its many participants and slow walk pace of traditional Japanese dancers.

Aomori Nebuta, a famous festival within Japan, presented an imported parade float at the 2007 Grand Parade. The parade took place on August 19, at 6pm, in order for the float's lights to be visible after nightfall.

The 2011 parade on August 14 featured former Los Angeles Dodgers manager Tommy Lasorda as grand marshal. American figure skater Mirai Nagasu, American actress and singer Gina Hiraizumi, Japanese singer and TV personality Kenichi Mikawa have appeared in the parade.

=== Go For Broke and U.S. 100th Infantry Battalion Exhibits ===
After World War II, exhibits were introduced about internment camps and JA veterans, including those of the U.S. 100th Infantry Battalion. Currently, the Japanese American National Museum (JANM) and Go For Broke Monument have replaced separate exhibits and the old JANM building. JA veterans still march annually in the Nisei Week Parade.

=== Nisei Week Car Show ===
The Car Show was introduced in 2000 and is produced by Mainstream Productions LLC. / Showoff Car Show. The show features import cars, exhibits, import models, along with car competitions for cash and sponsor prizes. The Car Show is one of the few admission based events at Nisei Week, covering the cash prize and logistics of a full fledge festival, including live entertainment and exhibits. The import scene is argued as both influenced and originated within the Asian American community and linked to Asian American identity.

=== Nisei Week Queen and Court ===
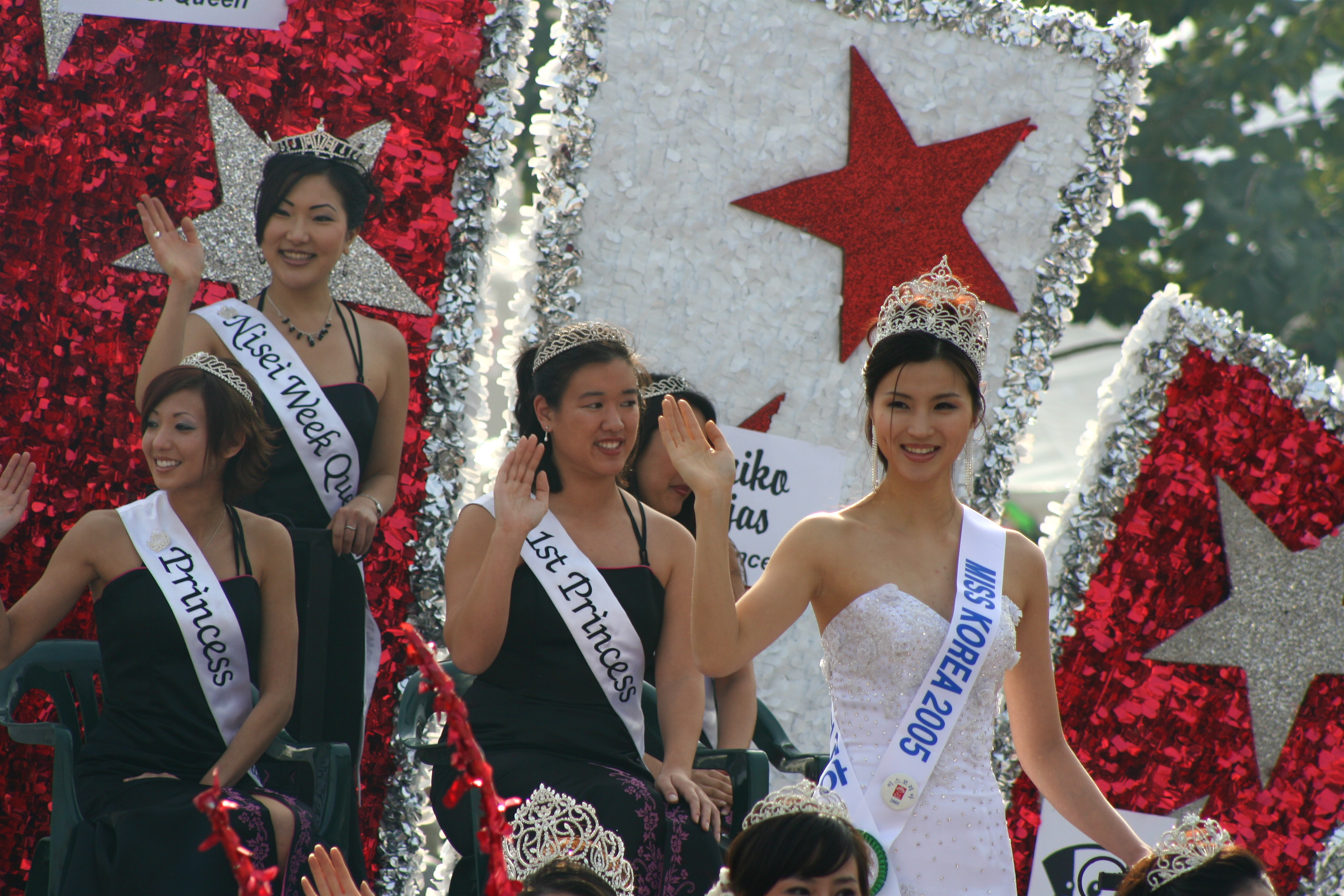
Nisei Week Queen, Princesses, and Miss Korea in 2005

The 2nd annual Nisei Week introduced the Nisei Week pageant and Nisei Week Coronation Ball in 1935. The pageant was created to help reinvigorate local business and promote goodwill in the greater Los Angeles community. In early years of the pageant, patrons of Little Tokyo businesses would receive a ballot to vote for the Queen. Today, the queen is crowned for her community service and presentation skills, with a formal coronation held for judging and celebration. New Queens and Princesses are inducted annually and featured prominently on float during the Nisei Week Parade. The Queen and Court are crowned at a formal dinner of 700 guests on the primary weekend of Nisei Week's festival. During the one-year reign, the Nisei Week court members have the opportunity to gain wide exposure to global dignitaries and local industry leaders and the chance to travel to cities including Nagoya, Japan; San Francisco; and Honolulu, Hawaii to experience the various sister festivals and make life-long connections.

2020s
	Nisei Week Queen	1st Princess	Miss Tomodachi	Princess	Princess	Princess	Princess
2025	Kimi Look	Megan Ayumi Miyamoto	Mika Fumiyo Megumi Dyo	Samantha Kimiyo Cirelli	Emma Yasuko Shojinaga Fukunaga	Casey Mariko Kuramoto	Mia Miyoko Takatsuka
2024	Morgan Mayuko Gee	Seia Loraine Watanabe	Amy Ryoko Kubo	Anita Sumi Yayi Komatsu	Caitlyn Tera Sasaki	Carina Aiko Sakimura	
2023	Kaitlyn Emiko Chu	Sara Emiko Kubo	Nancy Izumi Chin	Isabella Rose Polizzotto	Kamalani “Kama” Higashiyama	Kaili Mika Inouye	Aiko Marie Matsumura Dzikowski
2022	Kristine Emiko Yada	Audrey Emi Nakaoka	Maile Tabata Yanguas	Emily Shigeko Kumagai	Amanda Akiko Hiraishi	Lorie Hatsuko Meza	Faith Sumiko Nishimura
2021	Jaime Sunny Hasama	Brianne Mari Yasukochi	Kiyomi Arimitsu Takemoto	Kendra Alana Motoyasu	Michelle Toshiko Murakami	Kiyoko Alicia Nakatsui	
2020	NONE (cancelled by COVID-19 pandemic)						

2010s
	Queen	1st Princess	Miss Tomodachi	Princess	Princess	Princess	Princess	Princess
2019	Juli Yoshinaga	Mia Masae Lopez	Kara Chizuru Ito	Marika Kate Gotschall	Ariel Mei Imamoto	Emily Yuiko Ishida	Kayla Sachiko Igawa	
2018	Alice Marina Amano	Kelly Midori Tsunawaki Mock	Juli Ann Drindak	Lauren Rei Miyamoto	Tori Ai Kamada	Marica Katie Snyder		
2017	Jordyn Keiko Adachi	Yurika Kristy Yoneda	Kelly Akiko Sera	Kaitlin Tomomi Hara	Claire Mari Imada	Tomi Colleen Okuno	Jordyn Akari Terukina	
2016	Jaclyn Hidemi Tomita	Megan Tomiko Ono	Julie Kiyomi Tani	Heather Yoneko Iwata	Kaya Minezaki	April Leilani Nishinaka	Shannon Aiko Rose Tsumaki	
2015	Sara Kuniko Hutter	Veronica Toyomi Ota	Karen Nana Mizoguchi	Michelle Kaori Hanabusa	Kelsey Nakaji Kwong	Camryn Michiko Rie Sugita	Tamara Mieko Teragawa	
2014	Tori Angela Nishinaka-Leon	Lindsey Sugimoto	Ashley Akemi Arikawa	Tiffany Akemi Hashimoto	Melissa Sayuri Kozono	Dominique Ariadne Mashburn		
2013	Lauren Naomi Iwata	Ashley Mieko Honma	Megumi Yuhara	Stephanie Megumi Fukunaga	Laura Akemi Higashi	Jamie Tomiko Teragawa		
2012	Emily Folick	Crystal Hanano	Kaitlynn Sakurai	Lauren Tanaka Arii	Marci Asao	Erika Fisher	Sarah Fujimoto	
2011	Erika Olsen	Mimi Yang	Kay Yamaguchi	Jessica Kanai	Melissa Nishimura	Amber Piatt	Leann Fujimani	Michi Lew
2010	Lani Kume Nishiyama	Kelli Toshiye Teragawa	Jamie Joyce Hagiya	Brynn Nakamoto	Christy Sakamoto	Lauren Terumi Weber	Erin Reiko Yokomizo	

2000s
	Queen	1st Princess	Miss Tomodachi	Princess	Princess	Princess	Princess	Princess
2009	Dana Heatherton	Marisa Tamaru	Nicole Masuda	Michelle Hirose	Whitney Itano	Aimee Machida	Jennifer Akamine	
2008	Jill Kaori Hiraizumi	Kimberly Midori Kitaura	Lindy Sumiko Fujimoto	Lisa Takehana	Marissa Asako Ishii	Kie Flora Ito		
2007	Monika Taniguchi Teuffel	Saki Uechi	Christine Kimoto	Yoshie Okada	Mandy Kusumoto	Jennifer Minami		
2006	Liane Takano	Lisa Shimabukuro	Stefanie Fujinami	Colleen Suyenaga	Callen Kitaura			
2005	Steffanie Tamehiro	Kristyn Hayashi	Michelle Ito	Doreen Ogata	Ashley Wakayama	Kimiko Rojas		
2004	Nikki Kodama	Crystal Fukumoto	Yuki Naito	Jill Igarashi	Gayle Yuki Naito	Heather Nagano		
2003	Nicole Miyako Cherry	Ellie Asuka McFatridge	Kristi Higa	Linda Hatakeyama	Julia Hosoda	Alisyn Nakaba		
2002	Jamie Mizuhara	Kimberly Hayashi	Lisa Shimbashi	Dawn Mizuhara	Dawn Yoshioka	Sonia Totten	Lauren Kozaki	
2001	Lauren Hanako Kinkade	Silvia Yoshimizu	Norie Nakase	Michelle Moy	Akiko Hattori	Cindy Iwami		
2000	Tricia Tanaka	Erin Nomura	Emi Kawakami	Marlene Toyama	Jill Kadonaga	Traci Matsuda		

1900s
	Queen		Queen		Queen		Queen		Queen		Queen		Queen
1999	Traci Murase	1989	Sandra Fukushima	1979	Jeanne Nakagama	1969	Toni Sakamoto	1959	Faith Higurashi	1949	Terri Hokoda	1939	Shizue Narahara
1998	Tiffany Hattori	1988	Karen Uchizono	1978	Lisa Yamamoto	1968	Claire Nonoshita	1958	Jean Yasui	1948	NONE - WWII & Incarceration of Japanese Americans	1938	Margaret Nishikawa
1997	Janelle Hamabata	1987	LeeAnne Sera	1977	Loris Kurashige	1967	Joanne Uehara	1957	Mitzi Miya	1947	NONE - WWII & Incarceration of Japanese Americans	1937	Clara Suski
1996	Joann Shin	1986	Jennifer Ahn	1976	Sandra Toshiyuki	1966	Ruby Komai	1956	Phyllis Ono	1946	NONE - WWII & Incarceration of Japanese Americans	1936	Renko Oyama
1995	Judy Gilbertson	1985	Tish Okabe	1975	Dulcie Ogi	1965	Carol Kunitsugu	1955	Stella Nakadate	1945	NONE - WWII & Incarceration of Japanese Americans	1935	Alice Watanabe
1994	Kimi Evans	1984	Tamlyn Tomita	1974	Elisa Cuthbert	1964	Sandy Saito	1954	June Aochi	1944	NONE - WWII & Incarceration of Japanese Americans	1934	NONE
1993	Naomi Ono	1983	Tracy Isawa	1973	Cheryl Kawakami	1963	Helen Funai	1953	Judy Sugita	1943	NONE - WWII & Incarceration of Japanese Americans		
1992	Andrea Kawamoto	1982	Janet Barnes	1972	Carol Matsunaga	1962	France Yanai	1952	Emiko Kato	1942	NONE - WWII & Incarceration of Japanese Americans		
1991	Mutsuko Sata	1981	Frances Shima	1971	Joyce Kikuchi	1961	Dianne Kubota	1951	Aiko Ogomori	1941	Reiko Inouye		
1990	Sandra Posey	1980	Hedy Posey	1970	Joann Uyemura	1960	Penny Tani	1950	Sachi Kazunaga	1940	Shizue Kobayashi		

==== Pageant controversy ====
The pageant has not been without controversy. Originally the queen was selected through ballots given after purchases in Little Tokyo, allowing those making many purchases to vote many times; the rule was changed to allow a fairer chance for all contestants. One controversy remains within the JA community: mixed-race contestants. Competitors must be of at least 50% Japanese ancestry. Due to the increased out-marriage ratio of Japanese Americans, multi-racial (also known as hapa in the Japanese community) contestants began to appear more frequently, causing questioning about the Japanese cultural spirit of the competition and competing beauty standards of whites versus Asians.

Lon Kurashige, professor of ethnic studies at USC, argues that Nisei Queens played a subordinate role to as ambassadors to Issei, Nisei and white Americans. The Queens were viewed as bi-cultural, possessing "quiet charm" and "lively personality", attributed to Japanese and white Americans respectively. Criticism of sexism was brought forth by the Women's Concerns Committee within the JACL. The typical beauty portion of pageants, such as swimsuit competition, were eliminated from the Queen coronation. –

=== Nisei Week Street Arts Fair and Carnival ===
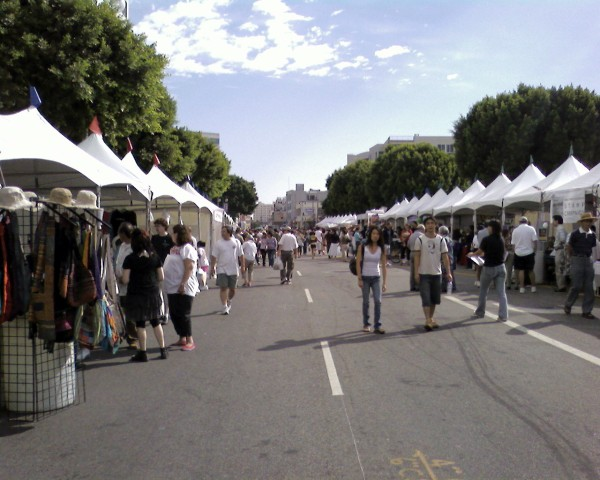
The Street Arts Fair during 2007.

Originally similar to a matsuri (Japanese style festival) or carnival, a street festival was held over the weekend, featuring games, crafts, and rides for children, along with food and arts vendors. Street Arts was created in addition to the carnival to feature Southern California crafts and food vendors. The old style carnival was largely removed by 2000's festival year. Street Arts and the carnival were always open to the public, with no admission fee.

The 2006 fair included an eating contest of dumplings (gyoza). World champion eaters Sonya Thomas and Joey Chestnut competed in the International Federation of Competitive Eating sanctioned event, with both competitors eating over 200 dumplings.

==== Old School Carnival Return ====
Mike Hagiwara, a Nisei Week committee member, announced the return of the "old school" Nisei Week carnival for 2007's festivities, under his direction. His press release, circulating by email and JA news, describes the nostalgia and eventual dwindling of the carnival. The carnival goals include creating long lasting and enjoyable memories to a new generation, along with helping the older generation relive memories of Nisei Week's past. The carnival also plans to avoid commercialization, using community groups to populate the vending and game booths. Hagiwara believes the carnival will help foster Japanese American identity, giving JAs a medium to feel better about themselves and their heritage.

=== JSN Matsuri ===
Partnering with the Japanese Student Network (JSN), Nisei Week's 66th annual celebration included a Japanese style carnival thrown by JSN.

=== Tofu Festival ===
In coordination with the Little Tokyo Service Center, Tofu Fest was added as a subcommittee to Nisei Week in 1996, focusing on Japanese cuisine and obon like atmosphere. As its name suggests, tofu was the primary ingredient of dishes and the cultural icon of the festival. The Tofu Festival was discontinued after 2007.

=== Nikkei Games ===
The Nikkei Games offers competition and activities for Japanese American sports leagues, and open events such as running for children. It also features martial art competitions and exhibitions. Nisei Week supports the JA community through Nikkei Games, as Japanese American sports leagues remain an important part of JA culture and history (see also: Nikkei sports).

=== Little Tokyo Anime Festival ===
The Little Tokyo Anime Festival features video gaming, manga, martial arts, anime, cosplaying, and other Japanese popular culture exports, as part of booths and exhibits. A cosplay contest is held, where arbitrated best costume winners are presented. Cosplayers also take part in the Nisei Week parade. The 2007 cosplay contest was held on August 19, inside the Little Tokyo Shopping Center.

Hundreds of cosplayers participated in the annual Nisei Week parade. They stopped at Second Street and San Pedro Street for a large group picture.

=== Nisei Week Fashion Show ===
The Nisei Week Fashion Show showcases fashion and provides entertainment acts. The Nisei Week court usually does an opening number to commence the event (e.g., a choreographed dance). Other Japanese-American models, often past Nisei Week court members, walk the runway to represent the clothing lines.

=== Nisei Week Baby Pageant ===
Stemming from the queen pageant, the Baby Pageant allows for parents to showcase new born members of the community and provide an event for parent networking.

=== Tanabata Festival ===
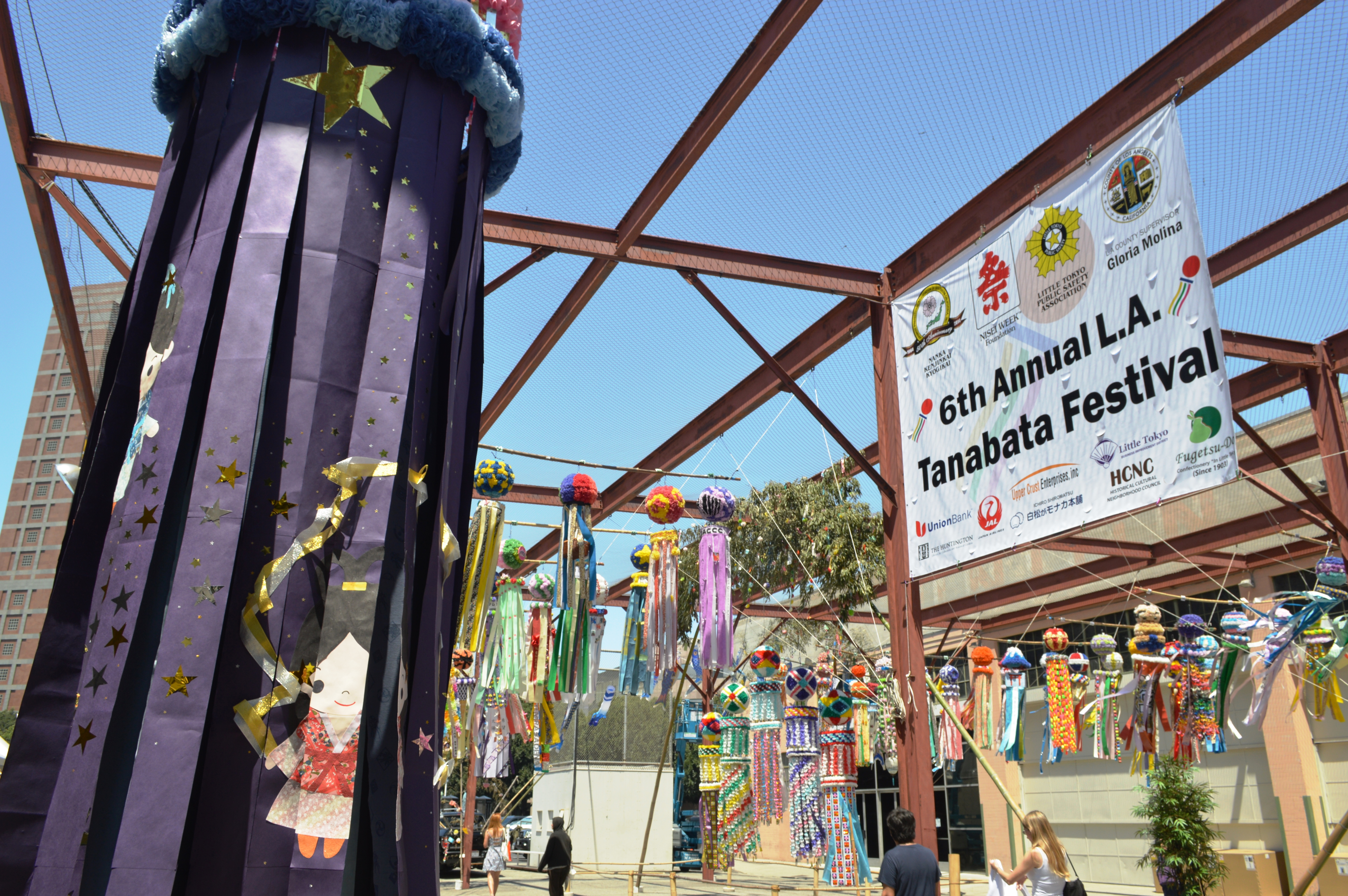
The 6th Los Angeles Tanabata Festival (2014), with various "kazari" ornaments

The annual Los Angeles Tanabata Festival was started in 2009 during Nisei Week by the Little Tokyo Public Safety Association. Various community groups participate with colorful handmade paper ornament streamers called kazari, which literally means decoration in Japanese. Many performers (for example, Japanese performance artist Miyuki Matsunaga with her Geta Dance Art) appear on the main stage. The 12th annual festival will take place in mid-August 2022 at the JANM Plaza in Little Tokyo as the festival went on hiatus in 2020-21.

=== Gyoza Eating Championship ===
The Day-Lee Foods World Gyoza Eating Championship, which has been an annual event since 2008 after being held in 2006, has become a major event on the Major League Eating calendar. The event attracts top stars on the competitive eating circuit, with Joey Chestnut and Matt Stonie winning the past few years. Other notable stars who have competed include Miki Sudo, Eric "Badlands" Booker, and Geoffrey Esper.

=== Ondo dancing and closing ===
In tradition of Japanese matsuris, traditional ondo dances are conducted in a closing celebration of Nisei Week's events. Madame Fujima Kansuma was 2006's official choreographer, where her and fellow instructors held chochin lanterns marked with the names of deceased instructors of the past. Public participation is encouraged, with formal dance troupes, Nisei Week Queen and Court, families, and community groups joining in for the dances.

Official passing of Nisei Week Foundation office positions to a new cabinet also takes place during closing speeches.

== See also ==
- History of the Japanese in Los Angeles
- Japanese American
- Japanese American Citizens League
- Japanese American National Museum
- Japanese diaspora
- Little Tokyo
- Matsuri
- Obon
- Tofu Festival
