= Eiko & Koma =

Japanese performance duo

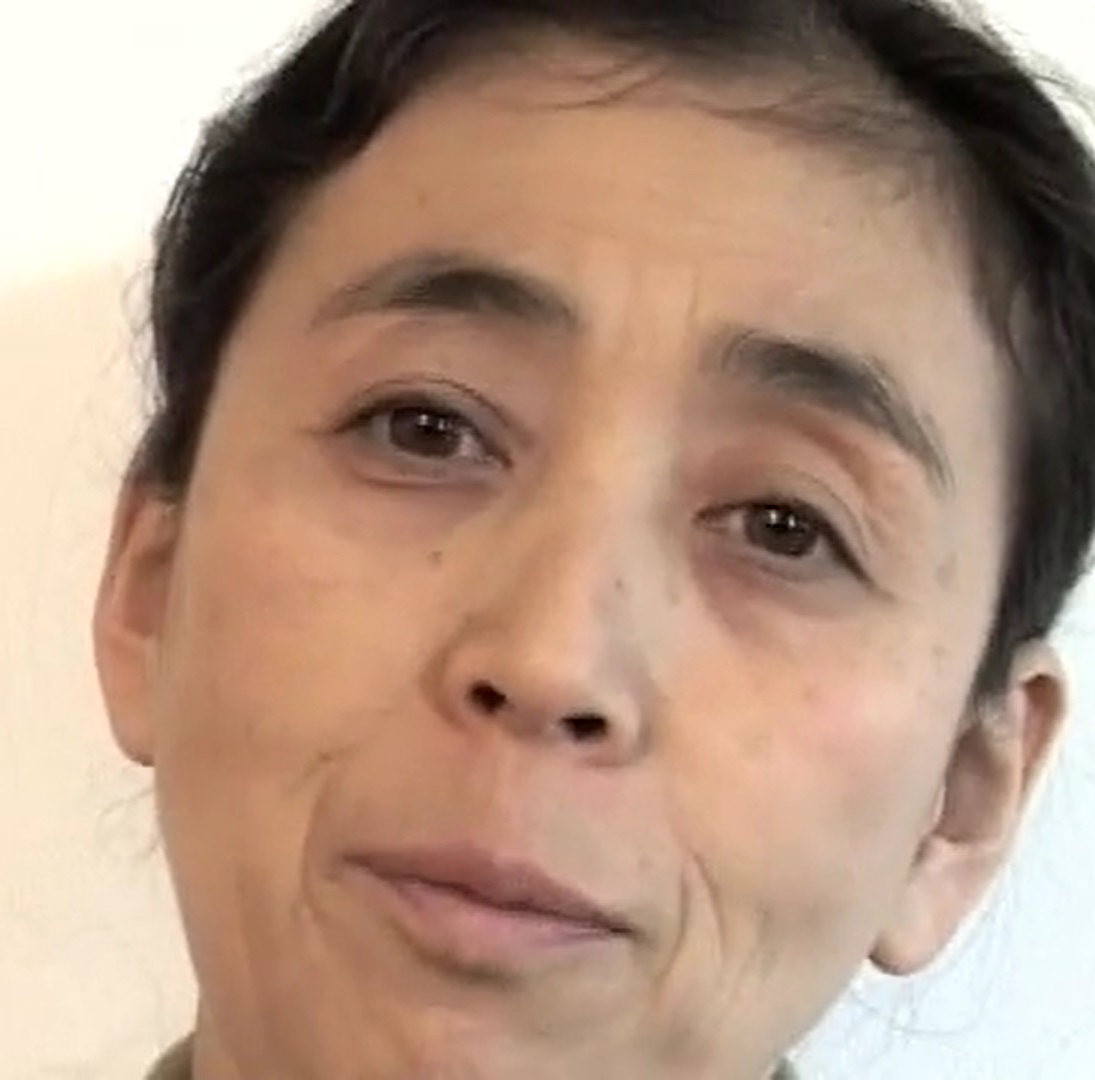
Eiko Otake in Speaking Portraits

Eiko Otake and Takashi Koma Otake, generally known as Eiko & Koma, are a Japanese performance duo. Since 1972, Eiko & Koma have worked as co-artistic directors, choreographers, and performers, creating a unique theater of movement out of stillness, shape, light, sound, and time.

For most of their multi-disciplinary works, Eiko & Koma also create their own sets and costumes, and they are usually the sole performers in their work. Neither of them studied traditional Japanese dance or theater forms and prefer to choreograph and perform only their own works. They do not bill their work as Butoh though Eiko & Koma cite Kazuo Ohno (a Butoh pioneer) as their main inspiration.

Eiko & Koma have been permanent residents of the United States in New York City since 1976. They have presented their works in theaters, universities, museums, galleries, and festivals worldwide, including numerous appearances in American Dance Festival, five seasons at BAM’s Next Wave Festival, four seasons at the Joyce Theater, and a month-long “living” gallery installation in the Whitney Museum of American Art. They were 1996 recipients of a MacArthur Fellows Program “genius grant”.

== Biography ==
Eiko (born in 1952) and Koma (born in 1948) were law and political science students in Tokyo when, in 1971, they each joined Tatsumi Hijikata’s company. Their collaboration began as an experiment and then developed into an exclusive partnership. They started to work as independent artists in Tokyo in 1972 and at the same time began to study with Kazuo Ohno, who, along with Hijikata, was a central figure in the Japanese avant-garde theatrical movement of the 1960s. Their interest in Neue Tanz took them to Hanover, Germany in 1972 where they studied with Manja Chmiel, a disciple of Mary Wigman. In 1973, they moved to Amsterdam, and for the next two years toured extensively in Europe.

The Japan Society sponsored the first American performance of Eiko & Koma's White Dance in May 1976. In 1983 Eiko & Koma performed for the first time at the American Dance Festival, which later commissioned many of their works. New Moon Stories (1986) at the Brooklyn Academy of Music’s Next Wave Festival marked their 10th anniversary in the United States and the first of five commissions from BAM. In 1996, Japan Society celebrated Eiko & Koma’s 20th anniversary by presenting Autumn Passage.

Eiko & Koma have toured to England, France, Germany, Finland, Switzerland, Netherlands, Austria, Israel, Portugal, Russia, Poland, the Baltic countries, Tunisia, Colombia, Brazil, Argentina, Korea, China, Taiwan, Cambodia, and Japan.

== Artistic style ==
Eiko & Koma’s iconoclastic work combines slow and nuanced movement vocabulary with bold theatrical design. Whether performing in a theater or in natural sites outdoors, Eiko & Koma often move as if they are not human. By doing so, they paradoxically evoke utterly human emotions from their viewers.

Eiko & Koma’s movement and choreography often progress in a scale of time that is radically different from everyday life or other theater productions. Many critics have used the term “glacier-like” to express the progression of their movement towards something unexpected. Eiko & Koma believe that humans are a part of nature and through their work they hope for humans to remember that. Many of their works contain nudity, which emphasizes the vulnerability of humans and transforms their appearance so they do not have everyday human bodies. Eiko, when asked about this aspect of their work in an interview, is quoted as saying, “A fish is naked and stone is naked. Why not us?”

== Awards ==
In 1996, Eiko & Koma were named MacArthur Fellows—the first time in the program’s fifteen-year history that the foundation awarded a fellowship to collaborators. They were named John Simon Guggenheim Memorial Foundation Fellows in 1984. They were awarded one of the first “Bessies” (the New York Dance and Performance Awards) in 1984 for their works Grain and Night Tide, and were honored again in 1990 for Passage. In 2004, Eiko & Koma received the Samuel H. Scripps/American Dance Festival Award for lifetime achievement in modern dance. In 2006 they were awarded with a Dance Magazine award and were designated among the first United States Artists.

== Work ==
Eiko & Koma’s noted stage collaborations include Mourning, (2007, with pianist Margaret Leng Tan), Cambodian Stories: An Offering of Painting and Dance, (2006, with young artists who graduated from the Reyum Art School), Offering (2003, with the clarinetist David Krakauer), Be With (2001, with Anna Halprin and cellist Joan Jeanrenaud), When Nights Were Dark (2000, with composer Joseph Jennings and a Praise Choir), the proscenium version of River (1997, with the Kronos Quartet, who performed Somei Satoh’s commissioned score live), Wind (1993, with Chanticleer and its music director Joseph Jennings) Land (1991, with Native American flutist/composer Robert Mirabal, American visual artist Sandra Lerner), By The River (1986, with visual artist Clayton Campbell) and Fluttering Black (1979, with Glenn Branca). Both When Nights Were Dark (2000) and Mourning (2007) were chosen as the year’s ten best dance works by the New York Times.

Designed to be performed in an intimate space, Eiko & Koma’s stage work Death Poem (2005) is a meditation on dying. Cambodian Stories (2006) toured to twelve cities in the United States in the spring of 2006. Charian and Peace, the two youngest of their Cambodian collaborators, performed a restaged version Grain and collaborated with Eiko & Koma in Quartet, both seen at the American Dance Festival in 2007. Their recent work, Hunger, was co-commissioned by the Walker Art Center and the Joyce Theater for the Joyce’s 25th anniversary and premiered in the fall of 2008. The Walker Art Center also commissioned their 2010 work Naked.

In addition to performing in theaters, during the past decade Eiko & Koma have created and presented site-adaptable performance installations at dozens of sites for more than 35,000 audience members. They have performed in sites such as parks, gardens, campus greens, private land, parking lots, city plazas, lakes, ponds, and graveyards. Outdoor works are usually presented as free-admission events. River (1995) takes place in a body of moving water. Breath (1998), commissioned by the Whitney Museum of American Art, is a “living” gallery installation. At the Whitney, Eiko & Koma performed for four weeks during museum hours. The Caravan Project (1999), performed in a specially modified trailer, is a “museum by delivery” installation. Offering, which premiered in New York’s Battery Park near Ground Zero in 2002, is a ritual of communal mourning. Dancing in the Street produced Offering in parks, plazas and gardens throughout Manhattan and Eiko & Koma later toured the work across America and internationally. Tree Song (2004) honors trees, their resilience, rebirth and endurance. Offering, Tree Song, and Cambodian Stories Revisited (2007) were all performed in the St Mark’s Church graveyard in Manhattan. Water (2011) was co-commissioned by the Lincoln Center and premiered in the Paul Milstein reflecting pool in Hearst Plaza, New York.

Prompted by the thought that the museum/gallery concept of a retrospective can be applied effectively to certain performing artists, Eiko & Koma constructed and presented a multi-faceted retrospective of their work from 2009 to 2012. The project included performative and non-performative aspects, including new commissions of a living installation and a stage work, reworking of older pieces, outdoor performances, photo exhibitions, video installations, showings of their media dances and documentaries, the publication of a retrospective catalog, workshops and other educational activities such as panel discussions and lectures. By applying the tools and concepts traditionally used in creating a visual art retrospective, Eiko & Koma had both a broader and deeper framework with which to engage audiences in their work. Visual and performing art curators worked in close collaboration with Eiko & Koma to examine their forty years of collaborative history. Raven (2010) was developed for the retrospective project. The first series of performances performed as part of the Retrospective project was titled Regeneration (2010). Time is Not Even: Space is Not Empty is a retrospective exhibition that was first shown in progress at Wesleyan University's Zilkha Gallery in 2009. In 2011, the exhibition opened at the Museum of Contemporary Art, Chicago with performances of Naked, The Caravan Project, and Regeneration.

== Eiko's solo work ==
Since 2014, Eiko has been performing her own solo project, A Body in Places. Eiko has collaborated with photographer and historian William Johnston, visiting post-nuclear meltdown Fukushima several times to create photo exhibitions, A Body in Fukushima, which have been presented in many cities where she has toured. In 2017, she launched a multi-year Duet Project that she will direct and perform with a diverse range of artists over the next several years.

Eiko’s solo project began with a 12-hour performance at 30th Street Station in Philadelphia. Since then, Eiko has performed variations of the project at over 40 sites. In spring 2016, she was the subject of the 10th annual Danspace Project Platform, titled A Body in Places. This month-long curated program included daily solos, weekly installations, a film series, a book club, discussions, group solo shows, Talking Duets, and a 24-hour photo exhibition of A Body in Fukushima. These activities brought her a Special Citation at the Bessie Awards (2016), an Art Matters fellowship (2015), and the Anonymous Was a Woman Award (2016).

In 2016, Eiko was named Dignity Initiative Artist in Residence at The Cathedral of St. John the Divine in New York, where A Body in Fukushima photographs were exhibited for six months. She created a 4-hour Fukushima memorial (March 11, 2017) and performed unannounced solos when she was in New York.

In November 2017, Eiko occupied, on each of three Sundays, the three Metropolitan Museum of Art sites: The Met Fifth Avenue, The Met Cloisters, and The Met Breuer. For each of these daylong durational performances of A Body in Places: The Met Edition, commissioned by MetLiveArts and co-presented by Performa 2017, Eiko had created 7½ hour video distillations of William Johnston’s photographs to “stain” the walls of the Met galleries with haunting images of herself dancing in ruined Fukushima.

Eiko has created two more versions of A Body in Fukushima: a 4½ hour video installation for gallery and museum exhibition, as well as a 3½ hour film for screening in theaters. Both will have U.S. and international premieres in 2019 and 2020. A book, A Body in Fukushima, will be co-published by Wesleyan University Press and Philadelphia Contemporary, and include 300+ images curated from a repository of tens of thousands of photographs created by Eiko and William Johnston during their four visits to Fukushima, as well as a series of writings by the artists on their time in an abandoned, irradiated landscape and their experience of expanded collaboration.

Also in 2017, during a Rauschenberg Residency on Captiva Island, FL, Eiko inaugurated The Duet Project, an open-ended series of cross-disciplinary, cross-cultural, and cross generational experiments with a radical diversity of fellow artists both living and dead. This new endeavor is supported by a National Dance Project Production Grant, Japan Foundation’s Performing Arts Japan award, and by a Dance/NYC Dance Advancement Fund award.

== Teaching ==
Eiko & Koma offer their Delicious Movement Workshop in communities and colleges on tour and in New York. They have taught semester long courses at UCLA and the City University of New York. In 2006, Eiko was invited to present a Delicious Movement Workshop at the International Peace Conference held at the Hiroshima Peace Memorial Museum in Japan.

Eiko is the founding fellow of the Center for Creative Research (CCR), an eleven-member think tank of choreographers who designed and implemented interdisciplinary study at U.S. institutions of higher learning. From her CCR activities, Eiko developed college courses that use movement study as means of inquiry along with readings and media studies. Currently, Eiko is a visiting artist in Dance and East Asian Studies at Wesleyan University in Middletown, Connecticut, as well as being Artist in Residence at the Cathedral of Saint John the Divine in Manhattan, New York. She also teaches regularly at NYU and Colorado College. During the 2017-2018 academic year, Eiko was a think tank fellow in Wesleyan University's College of the Environment on the theme of "From Disruptions to Disasters: A Lens on the Human-Environment Relationship."

== Stage works ==
- Flower Dance (2013)
- Fragile (2012)
- White Dance - Revival (2010)
- Raven (2010)
- Hunger (2008)
- Grain - Revival (2007)
- Mourning (2007)
- Quartet (2007)
- Cambodian Stories (2006)
- Death Poem (2005)
- Duet (2004)
- Be With (2001)
- When Nights Were Dark (2000)
- Snow (1999)
- River (proscenium version, 1997)
- Autumn Passage (1995)
- Wind (1993)
- Land (1991)
- Passage (1989)
- Memory (1989)
- Rust (1989)
- Tree (1988)
- New Moon Stories (1986)
- By The River (1986)
- Thirst (1985)
- Night Tide (1984)
- Elegy (1984)
- Beam (1983)
- Grain (1983)
- Nurse's Song (1981)
- Trilogy (1979–1981)
- Fluttering Black (1979)
- Before The Cock Crows (1978)
- Fur Seal (1977)
- White Dance (1976)

== Outdoor and site works ==
- Water (2011)
- The Caravan Project Revisited (2011–2012)
- Tree Song (2004)
- Cambodian Stories Revisited (2007)
- Offering (2002)
- The Caravan Project (1999)
- River (outdoor work, 1995)
- Event Fission (1980)

== Living installation/gallery works ==
- The Caravan Project (2013)
- Tea House (2011)
- Residue (2011)
- Naked (video installation, 2011)
- Time is Not Even, Space is Not Empty (2011)
- On Nakedness (video installation, 2011)
- Naked (2010)
- Time is Not Even, Space is Not Empty (2009)
- Breath (1998)

== Dance for camera ==
- Wake (2011)
- Breath (1999)
- Undertow (1988)
- Husk (1987)
- Lament (1985)
- Bone Dream (1985)
- Wallow (1984)
- Tentacle (1983)

== See also ==
- Contemporary Dance in Japan
- Category:Wesleyan University faculty
