= Fujima Kansuma =

Japanese-American dancer (1918–2023)

- 藤間 勘須磨
- Born: Sumako Hamaguchi; May 9, 1918; San Francisco, United States
- Died: February 22, 2023 (aged 104); Los Angeles, United States
- Occupation: Kabuki dance

Sumako Hamaguchi (9 May 1918 – 22 February 2023), known by her stage name Fujima Kansuma (藤間 勘須磨, Kansuma Fujima) was a Japanese-American kabuki dancer. She taught more than 2,000 dancers, 50 of whom have been granted professional standing by kabuki grandmasters.

== Early life ==
Sumako Hamaguchi was born in San Francisco on May 9, 1918, and was the older of two sisters. When she was three years old, her family moved to Los Angeles. She was often sick and bedridden, prompting a doctor to advise her mother to find an activity to build up her immunity. Her mother chose kabuki and their daughter began lessons at 9, immersing herself in the classical form of Japanese theater.

In 1934, she participated in the very first Nisei Week Japanese Festival. That same year she traveled to Japan to study under kabuki star Kikugoro Onoe VI. Over the course of four years she learned acting, dancing, kimono dress and etiquette, shamisen and tokiwazu music. In Japan she was mocked as "the girl from America" by her peers. After only four years of training, Kikugoro granted her permission to perform his signature dance, the "Kagami Jishi" (Mirror Lion Dance). In 1938 she received her stage name from Fujima Kanjuro VI, grandmaster of the Fujima School. When she was ready to return home, she used her savings to purchase costumes and returned to Los Angeles to open a dance studio in a hotel owned by her father in 1940. She later added classes in Norwalk, Gardena, and West Los Angeles.

During World War II, following the signing of Executive Order 9066, Kansuma and her family were first sent to the Santa Anita Assembly Center and then to Rohwer War Relocation Center. Upon her arrival at Rohwer, she was permitted to teach and perform in different War Relocation Authority camps. Under armed guard, Kasuma received special permission to travel to Los Angeles to retrieve more costumes and music.

=== Postwar ===
After World War II, Kansuma returned to Little Tokyo and re-established her dance studio. She worked with Walt Disney, who liked to infuse an "international flavor" in his shows, on such projects as "Family Night". Through more than 70 years of dancing, Kansuma taught nearly 2,000 students, among them her daughter, Miyako Tachibana, who achieved kabuki master status.

Kansuma danced in the Rose Parade and the 1984 Olympics and performed for Emperor Akihito. In 1985, she was awarded with the Order of the Precious Crown, 5th Class. National Endowment for the Arts deemed her a National Heritage Fellow for the Arts in 1987. In 2004, Kansuma was given the Japanese American National Museum’s Cultural Ambassador Award.

In 2018, Kansuma celebrated her centennial with a performance at the Aratani Theatre. She died on February 22, 2023, from congestive heart failure.
