= Geta Dance Art =

Geta Dance Art is a performing style that combines traditional Japanese dance with modern dance, singing, and live painting. It was created and developed by Japanese performance artist Miyuki Matsunaga, with music by Cirque Du Soleil adapter and musician Pierre Dubé.

== Characteristics ==
Geta Dance Art blends elements of Japanese traditional dance, modern dance, and deep vocal singing with live painting and acting. The goal of each dance piece is to express strong emotions through a vibrant theatrical presentation.

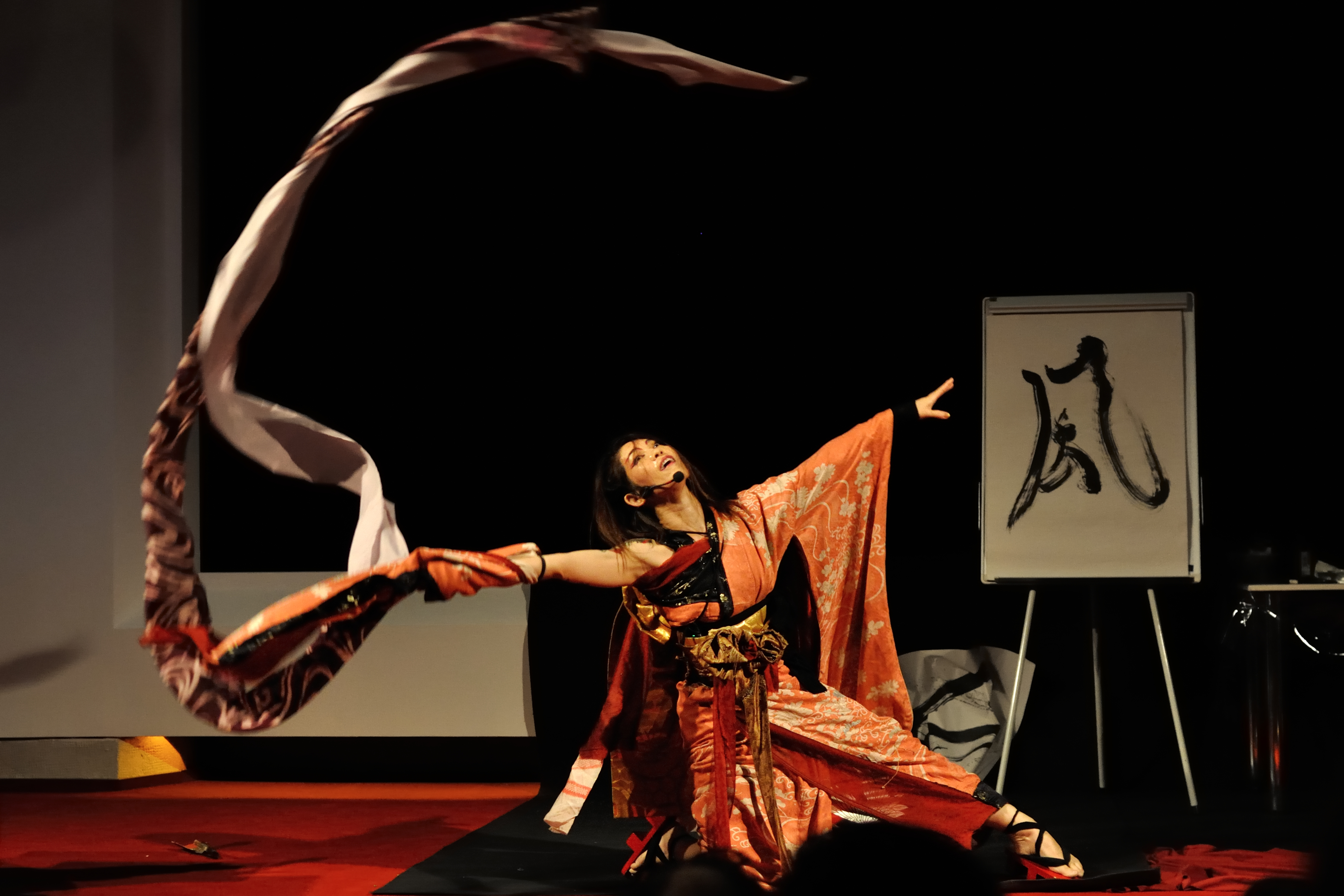
A Geta Dance Art performance.

Performers wear geta (Japanese wooden sandals) and custom-made kimono. In addition, they use various traditional Japanese accessories—including sensu (fan), kasa (umbrella) and katana (sword) -- to visually enhance the performances.

Each Geta Dance Art piece has its own story that is portrayed through intricate choreography.

Typically, a performance will include a live painting of Japanese calligraphy. Common compositions during performances are the Japanese kanji for the four Earth elements: earth, water, wind, and fire.

The music is in the New Age music style and is performed using taiko drums, a shakuhachi (bamboo flute), and a shamisen.

== History and development ==
Inspired by kabuki theatre and Japanese traditional dance, and wanting to incorporate those traditions into a more modern approach, Matsunaga began to formulate her new dance method in 2005. After coming up with the idea to perform the new style using geta sandals, she named it Geta Dance.

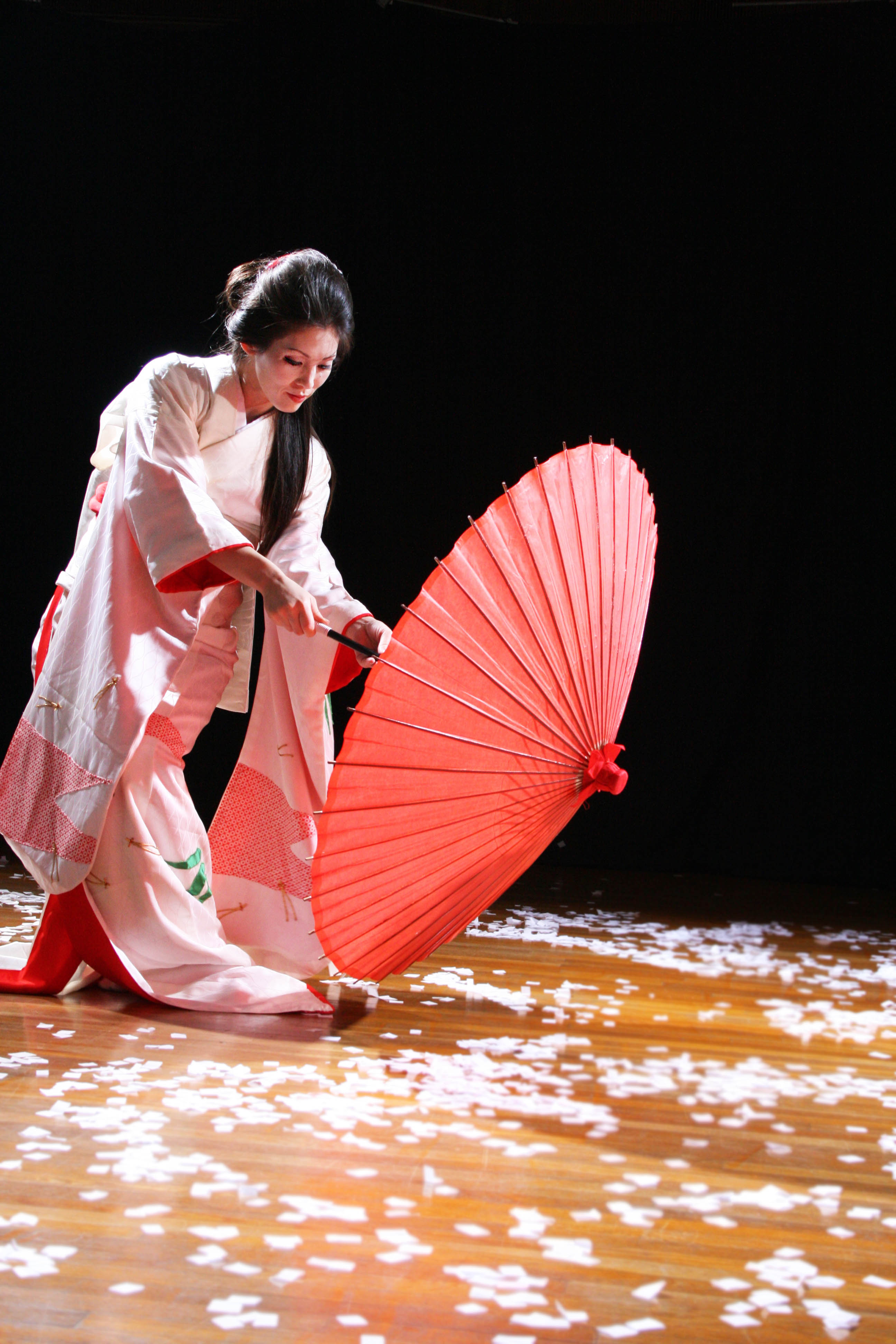
A Geta Dance Art performance.

Matsunaga first started performing Geta Dance at the 2nd Street Jazz Club in the Little Tokyo neighborhood of Los Angeles, where she gained a following. Soon, Japanese folk singer Marisa Kosugi asked Matsunaga to perform Geta Dance as the opening act for her minyo (Japanese folk music) shows at Japanese festivals and events throughout California. Shortly thereafter, Matsunaga began performing at county fairs, art galleries, and other venues. She later served as the opening act for Japanese pop singer Ai (singer). In 2008 Matsunaga performed Geta Dance alongside lead actress Mary Takeyama in the Baseline Productions motion picture Subprime Children. In 2009 she performed on the 7Jem Productions television pilot Let's Chat Girls. She also performed in a commercial for Sekka rice, which aired on United Television Broadcasting Systems, Inc.'s Channel 18 for several years.

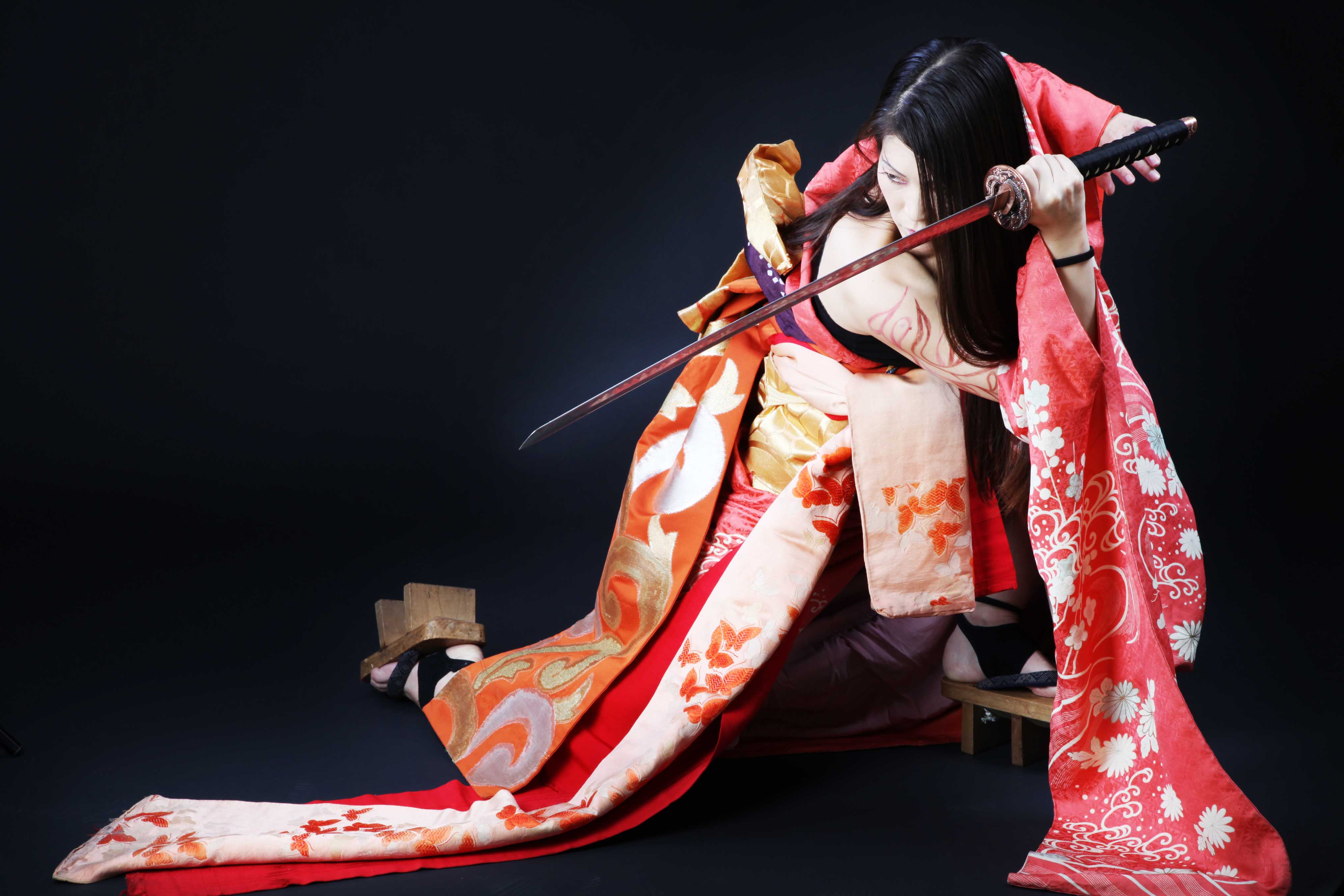
A Geta Dance Art performance.

In 2008 Matsunaga, who up to that point had been using various New Age music recordings to accompany her performances, met Pierre Dubé, music adapter and taiko performer for the Cirque Du Soleil production Mystere. Initially, Dubé gave Matsunaga permission to use one of his original songs for her Geta Dance shows. Impressed by her performances, he began to provide more of his works, and his compositions came to comprise the bulk of the music for Geta Dance shows.

In 2012 Matsunaga added the live painting component to her performances, after which she renamed the style Geta Dance Art.

Matsunaga has been invited to perform Geta Dance Art in Germany, Lithuania, India, and throughout the United States.

== Criticism ==
While Geta Dance Art has gotten much acclaim, it has also received some criticism from advocates of traditional Japanese dance. It has been called inauthentic, and Matsunaga has been accused of lowering the standards of Japanese dance. Some have also criticized the look and aesthetics of Geta Dance Art, likening its female practitioners to appearing like prostitutes or onna tsubofuri shi, the women who worked for yakuza gambling dens in Edo period Japan.

== See also ==
- Contemporary dance in Japan
