= Los Angeles Tofu Festival =

Former annual matsuri in Little Tokyo, Los Angeles

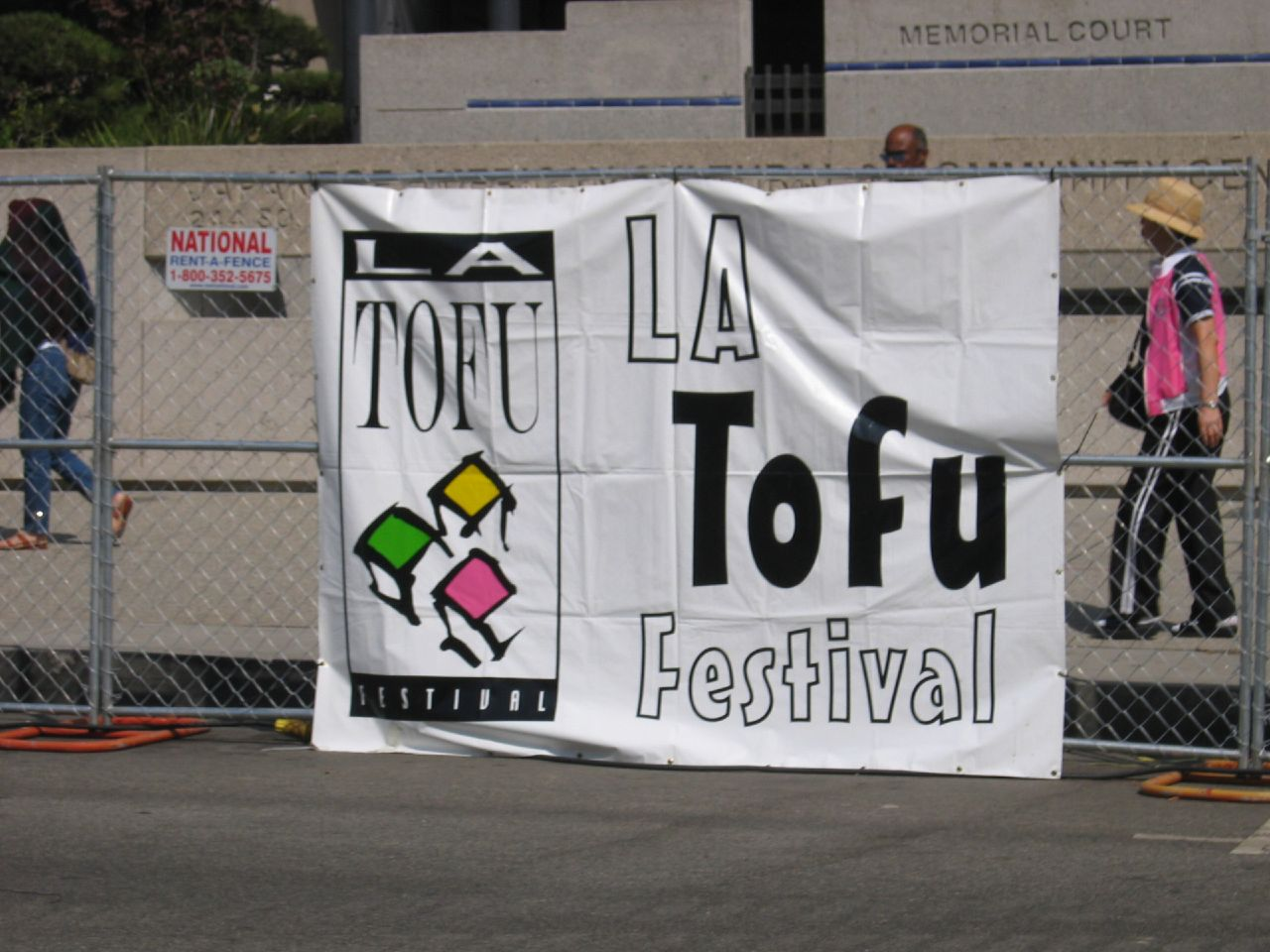
A banner at the Tofu Festival in 2005

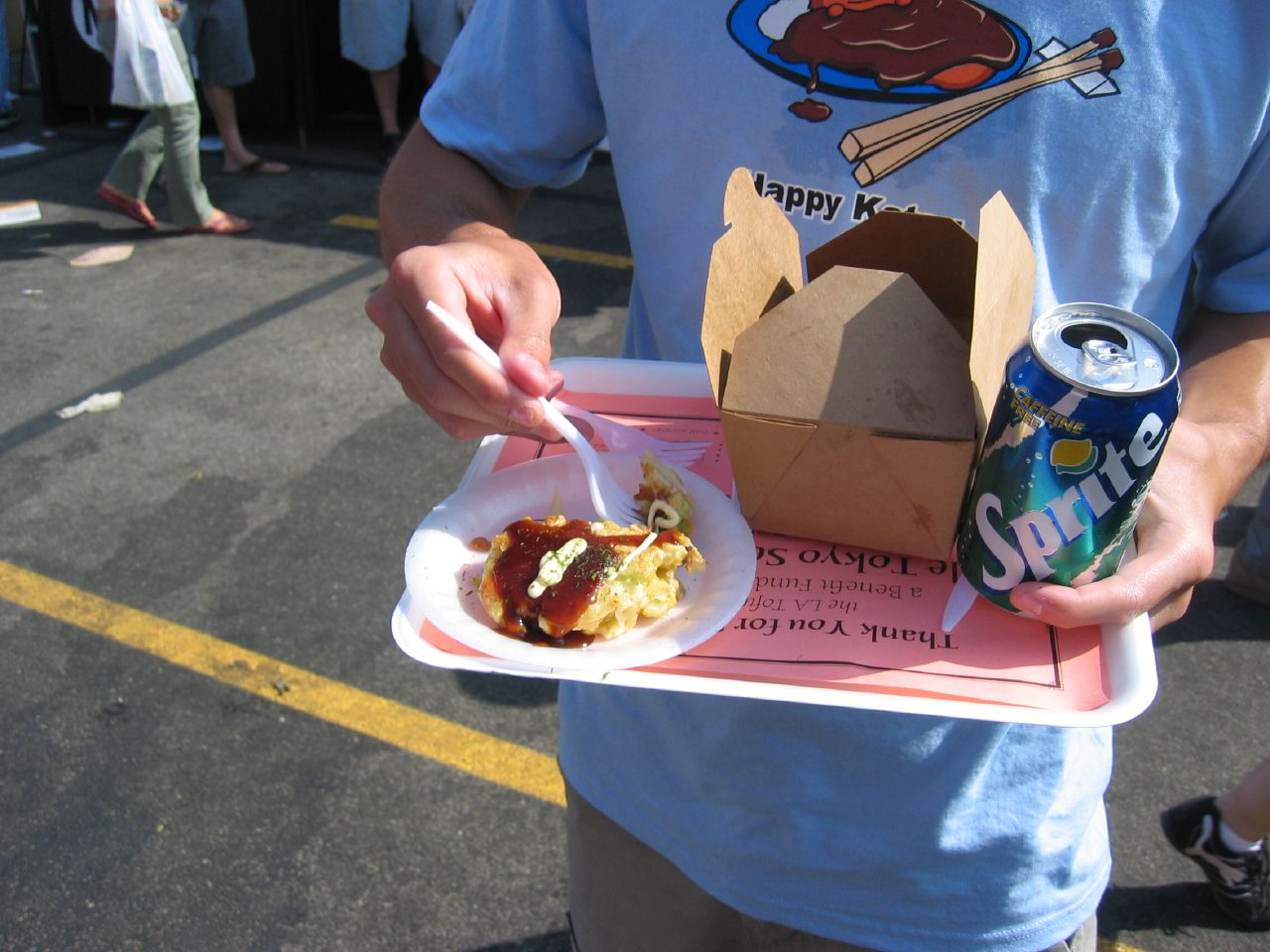
Food at the Tofu Festival in 2005

Los Angeles Tofu Festival, usually known as Tofu Festival or Tofu Fest, was a weekend matsuri held every August in Little Tokyo, Los Angeles, from 1995 to 2007. Due to redevelopment in Little Tokyo there was no longer enough space to hold a festival of the size of Tofu Fest, and the last festival was held in 2007.

Tofu is the primary ingredient of dishes and the cultural icon of the festival, which focuses on innovative Japanese and American cuisine within an obon-like atmosphere. Due to Tofu Fest's wider cultural and commercial appeal, and larger funds to work with (Tofu Fest charged admission into its area), it outgrew Nisei Week's Street Arts Fair in booths—Tofu Fest's first fair had over 8,000 visitors and over 26,000 visitors by 2004.

== History and tradition ==
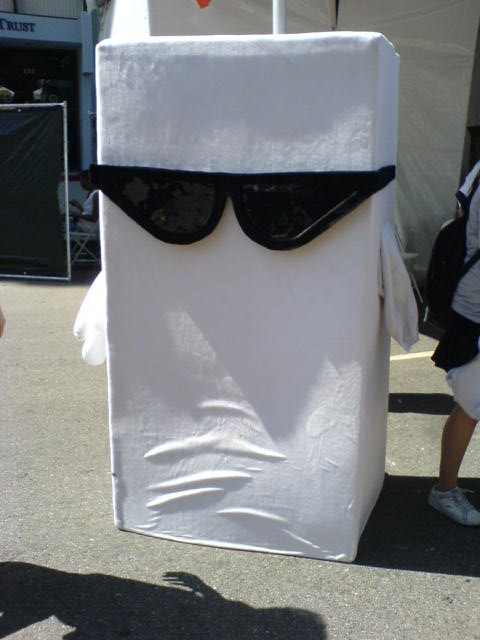
Mr. Tofu at the final Tofu Festival in 2007

Invented by several Little Tokyo Service Center (LTSC) board members as a theme for a food festival, Tofu Fest was approved by the LTSC in 1995 and added as a subcommittee to the Nisei Week Foundation with support from the Japanese American Cultural and Community Center (JACCC) and sponsorship from Hinochi (now House Foods). Tofu Fest became the first festival in honor of tofu worldwide in 1996. All proceeds go to the LTSC.

Tofu Festival used annual themes to both enhance the atmosphere and promote certain goals. A tofu block is Tofu Festival's mascot, which changes appearance and nickname depending on the year's theme. The theme for 2006 was "It's Hip to Be Square!", featuring the tofu block mascot wearing sunglasses and earrings.

The festival was the focus of an episode of Visiting... with Huell Howser that originally aired in Southern California on KCET. The episode featured a visit to the third annual festival in 1997, showcasing the variety of dishes available and reactions from tofu devotees and first-timers alike.

== Attractions ==
=== Beer, wine and sake garden ===
A selection of sake and beer was served in a sectioned off portion of Tofu Fest, supplementing Little Tokyo's own beer gardens and Nisei Week's attractions. The sale of alcohol was under debate by the festival's committee in 1994 in regards to making the festival more family friendly.

=== Celebrity chefs ===
Famous chefs exhibit their craft on a cooking platform, with fair goers getting the chance to taste dishes from the demonstrations. Masaharu Morimoto of Iron Chef was a recurring guest, appearing in the 2006 festival.

=== Children's pavilion ===
Children were previously given an additional area to enjoy the festival, as parts of the festival, like the alcohol garden, were unsuitable. After 2006, Children's Pavilion was no longer a featured event.

=== Entertainment stage ===
Bands and artists appear live at the festival, ranging from instrumental groups, such as taiko and orchestra, to hip hop groups like Blackalicious.

=== Tofu eating contest ===
The tofu eating contest was a race to eat a 14-ounce block of tofu in the shortest amount of time. Several elimination rounds are held before the final battle and winner's ceremony, where a prize is given to the winner on the entertainment stage.

== See also ==
- Japanese Americans
- Nikkei people
- Japanese American Citizens League
