= Japanese traditional dance =

Traditional styles of Japanese dance

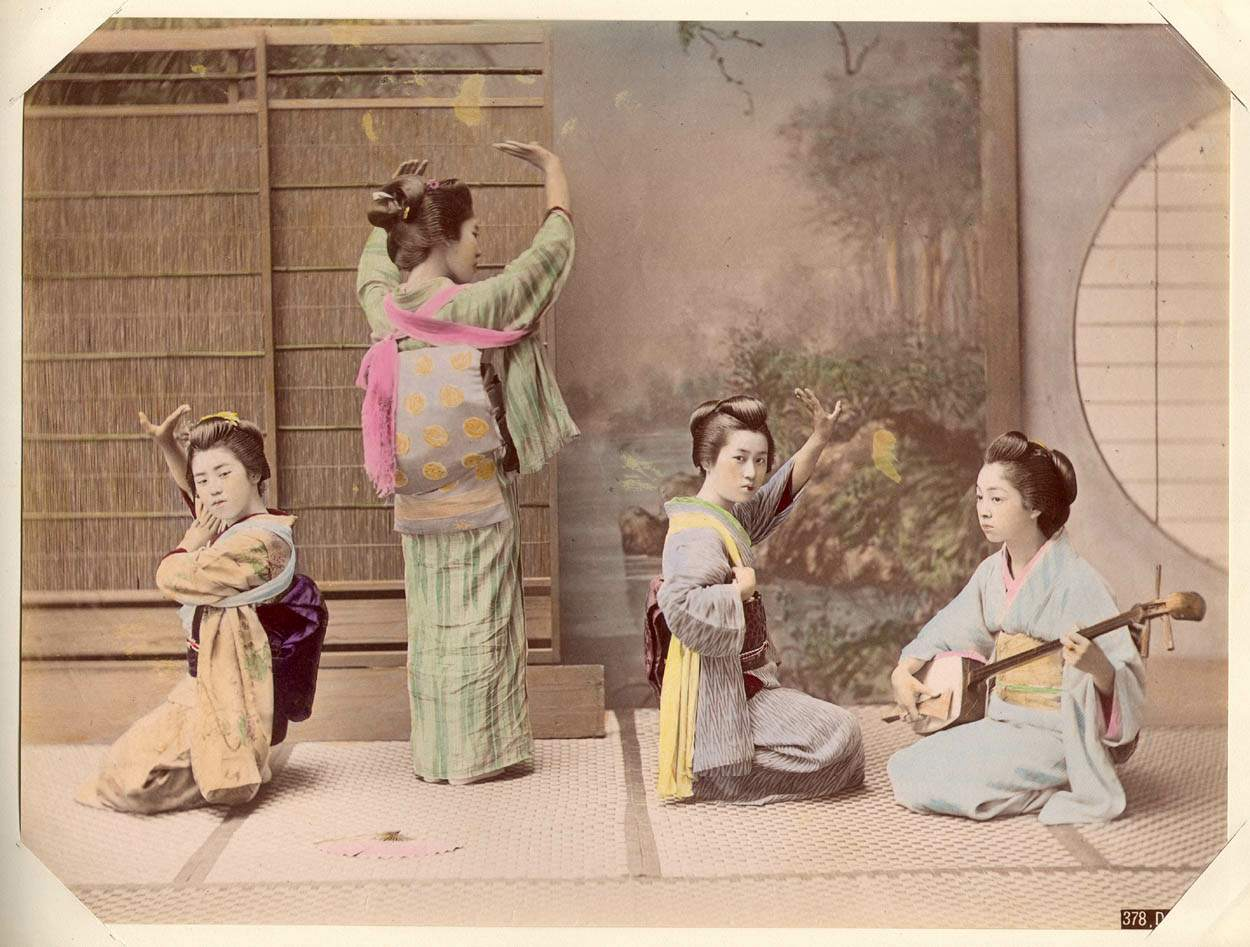
An early photograph of Japanese women in dance pose

Japanese traditional dance describes a number of Japanese dance styles with a long history and prescribed method of performance. Some of the oldest forms of traditional Japanese dance may be among those transmitted through the kagura tradition, or folk dances relating to food producing activities such as planting rice (dengaku) and fishing, including rain dances. There are large number of these traditional dances, which are often suffixed -odori, -asobi, and -mai, and may be specific to a region or village. Mai and odori are the two main groups of Japanese dances, and the term buyō (舞踊) was coined in modern times as a general term for dance, by combining mai (舞) (which can also be read as bu) and odori (踊) (which can also be read as yō).

Mai is a more reserved genre of dance that often has circling movements, and dances of the Noh theatre are of this tradition. A variation of the Mai style of Japanese dance is Kyomai, or Kyoto-style dance. Kyomai developed in the 17th century Tokugawa cultural period. It is heavily influenced by the elegance and sophistication of the manners often associated with the Imperial Court in Kyoto. Odori has more vigorous stepping movements and is more energetic, and dances of the kabuki theatre belong to this category.

== Classification ==
Japanese traditional oiran dance, 2023

There are several types of traditional Japanese dance. The most basic classification is into two forms, mai and odori, which can be further classified into genres such as Noh mai or jinta mai, the latter style having its origins in the pleasure districts of Kyoto and Osaka.

The mai style is reserved and typified by circling movements where the body is kept low to the ground. The odori style includes folk dances performed at annual Bon festival events and dances that were part of traditional kabuki performances. The odori style features larger movements and is typically more energetic.

Traditional dance forms in the present day have also been influenced by Western dance forms like ballet, which were introduced to Japan during the Meiji Restoration. In Sagi Musume ('The Heron Maiden') the dancer's role is the spirit of the heron. In classical versions, the spirit assumes a handsome, strong pose at the end of the dance. However, this classical ending was altered in later versions (which borrowed heavily from Anna Pavlova's performances of The Dying Swan) so the spirit gradually became lifeless, ultimately sinking to the floor.

== Kabuki ==
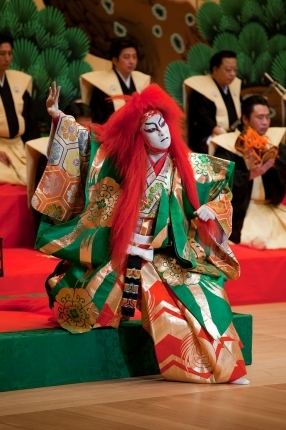
A Renjishi performance

Kabuki (歌舞伎) is a classical Japanese dance-drama. Kabuki theatre is known for the stylization of its drama and for the elaborate make-up worn by some of its performers.

The individual kanji characters, from left to right, mean 'sing' (歌), 'dance' (舞), and 'skill' (伎). Kabuki is therefore sometimes translated as 'the art of singing and dancing'. These are, however, ateji characters which do not reflect actual etymology. The kanji of 'skill' generally refers to a performer in kabuki theatre. Since the word 'kabuki' is believed to derive from the verb kabuku, meaning 'to lean' or 'to be out of the ordinary', kabuki can be interpreted as 'avant-garde' or 'bizarre' theatre. The expression kabukimono (歌舞伎者) referred originally to those who were bizarrely dressed and swaggered on a street.

The history of kabuki began in 1603, when Izumo no Okuni, possibly a shrine maiden of Izumo Taisha Temple, began performing a new style of dance drama in the dry riverbeds of Kyoto, and they were then called "strange" or "unusual" (kabuki). This new form of dance drama is thought to have been derived from folk-dances performed only by women, furyū-ō odori and nembu odori. Kabuki became a common form of entertainment in Yoshiwara, the registered red-light district in Edo. During the Genroku era, kabuki thrived. The structure of a kabuki play was formalized during this period, as were many elements of style. Conventional character types were established, as were many of the most popular and still-performed plays.

== Noh mai ==
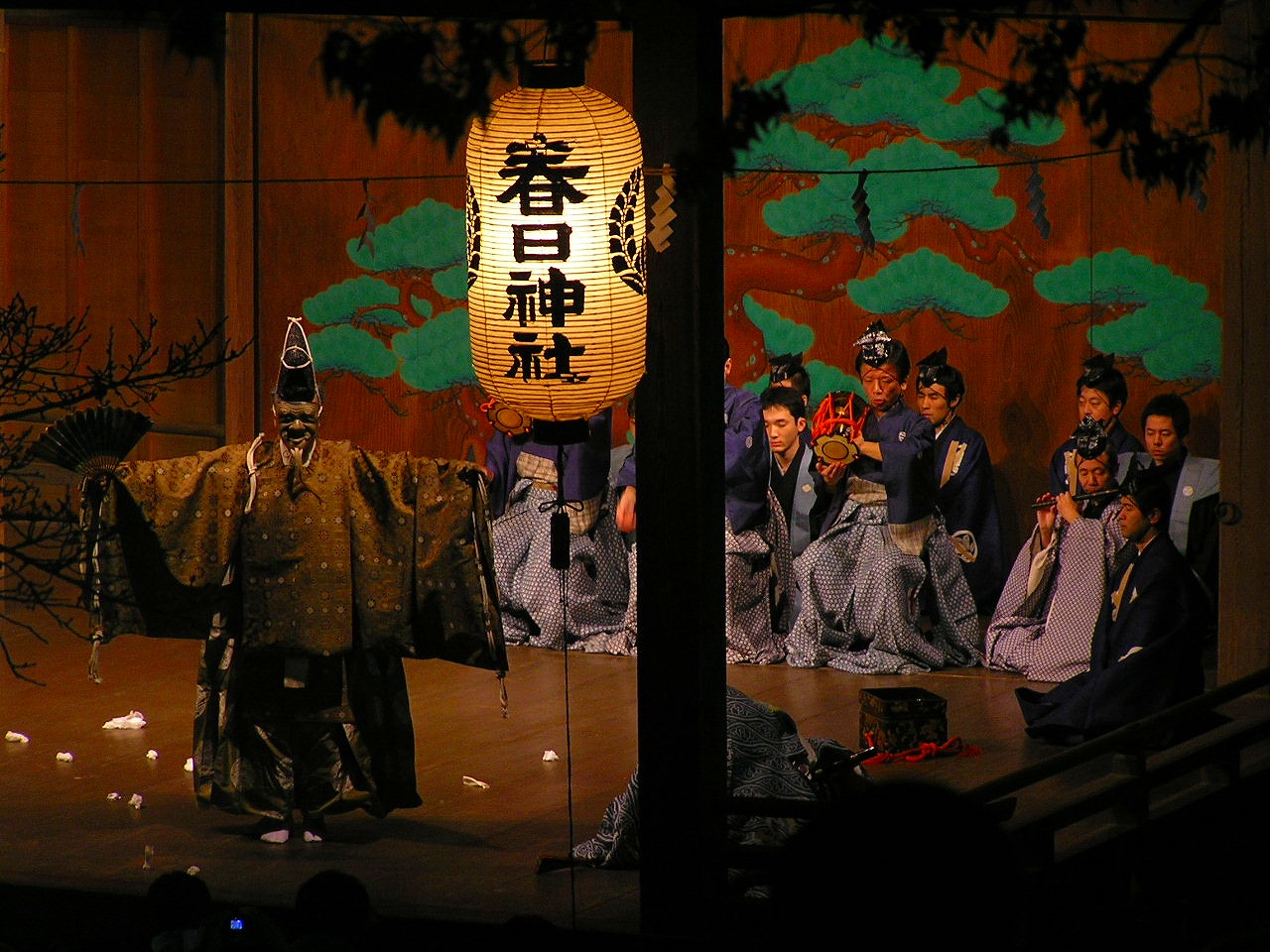
Noh is a stylized dance drama that originated in the 14th century. Performers wear various masks and play the roles of kami, onryō (vengeful spirits), and historical and legendary figures.

The origin of Noh mai can be traced back to as far as the fourteenth century. Noh mai is a dance that is done to music that is made by flutes and small hand drums called tsuzumi. At various points the performers dance to vocal and percussion music; these points are called kuse or kiri. Noh mai dances are put together by a series of forms. Forms are patterns of body movements that are done elegantly and with beauty.

There are several types of Noh mai dances. A type that is neither slow nor fast is called chu no mai, and is usually performed by a female dancer. A slower type of dance is the jo no mai, which is also done by a female, sometimes dressed up as a ghost of a noble woman, a spirit, or a deity. A male's dance is otoko mai. In otoko mai the performer does not wear a mask and is portraying the character as being heroic. Another male dance is kami mai, where the dancer acts as though he is a deity. This is a very fast dance. The female version of this is called kagura and can be performed in various ways. Gaku is a dance that imitates music played at the imperial court and is usually done by the main character in a Noh drama. These are the six varieties that make up the Noh mai dance types.

Costumes are a major part of Noh theatre, including the Noh mai. Dances and play may start out slowly, so actors create flamboyant, colourful costumes to keep the audience engaged. They also dress to fit the aspects the characters represent, for example a bamboo hat worn by a character represents country life. The most important part of the Noh costumes are the masks. The Noh mai masks are thought to be the most artistic masks in Japan. The masks are only worn by the main characters. The masks have neutral expressions so it is the job of the actor to bring the character to life.

== Nihon buyō ==
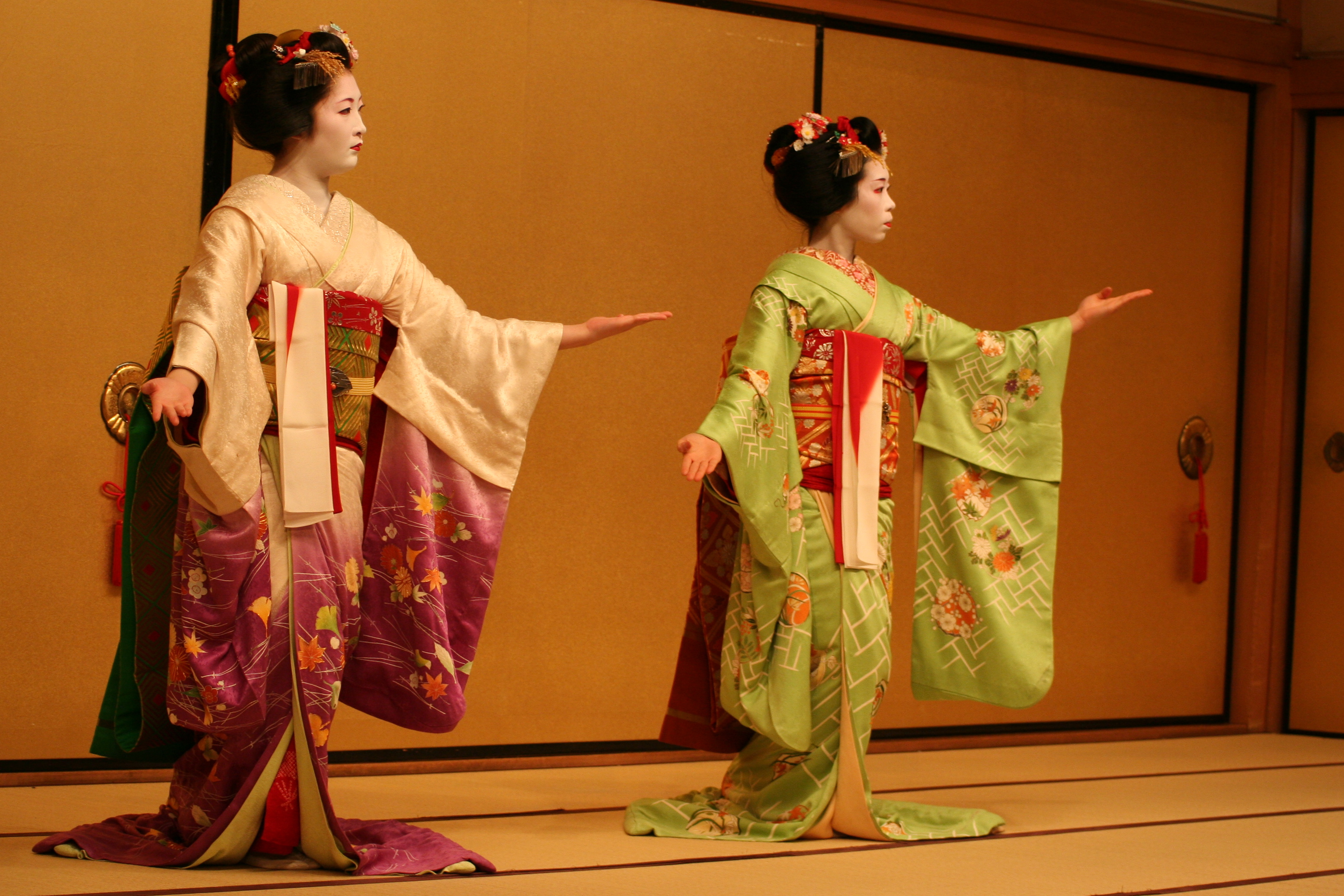
Two maiko performing a dance

Nihon buyō is different from most other traditional dances. It is intended for entertainment on stage. Nihon buyō is a refined dance that has been improved throughout four centuries.

There are four parts to nihon buyō, the most significant part being kabuki buyō. Most of the repertoire has been borrowed from 18th and 19th century kabuki theatre and even from the yūkaku (pleasure quarters) of Edo Japan.

Nihon buyō was created directly from kabuki buyō before it became theater. The second part of nihon buyō is Noh. Nihon buyō takes a few key elements from Noh such as the circular movements and the tools used in its dances. The third part of these dances comes from the folk dances; the spinning and jumping used in folk dances was incorporated into nihon buyō. The last part came from a mixture of European and American culture that is found in Japan today.

Nihon buyō did not reach its present form until the Meiji Restoration of 1868 during a time when Western dance forms were being introduced to Japan. Thus, the present day form of nihon buyō was influenced by dance forms like ballet.

== Folk dances ==
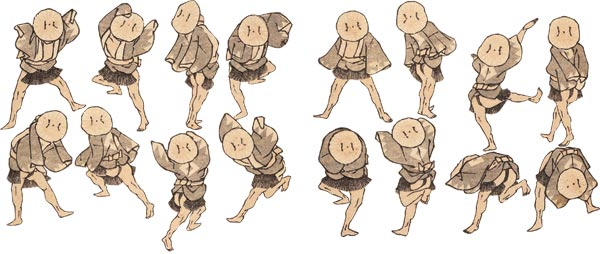
Katsushika Hokusai published suzume odori in his manga in 1815.

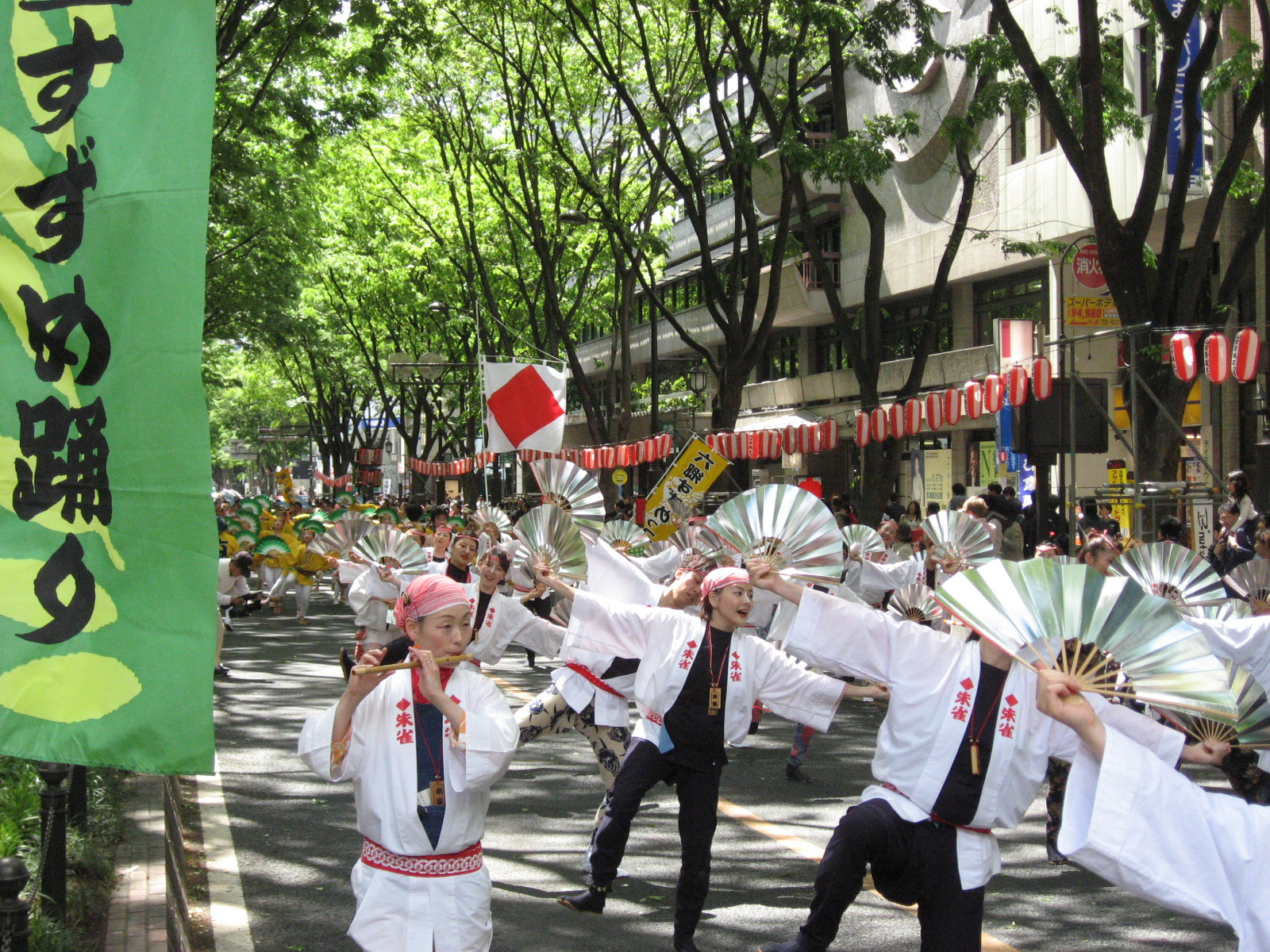
Suzume odori contestants at Aoba matsuri festival with a flutist

There are a wide variety of folk dances in Japan. Folk dances are often the basis from which other dance forms developed. An example of a Japanese folk dance is the sparrow dance (雀踊り, suzume odori), a dance based upon the fluttering movements of the Eurasian tree sparrow. It was first performed and improvised by stonemasons who were constructing Sendai Castle for the daimyō Date Masamune. The emblem of the Date clan incorporates two tree sparrows. The sparrow dance is now performed yearly in Sendai, Miyagi Prefecture at the Aoba festival in mid-May. School children in Miyagi prefecture learn and perform the sparrow dance, especially during the Obon Festival.

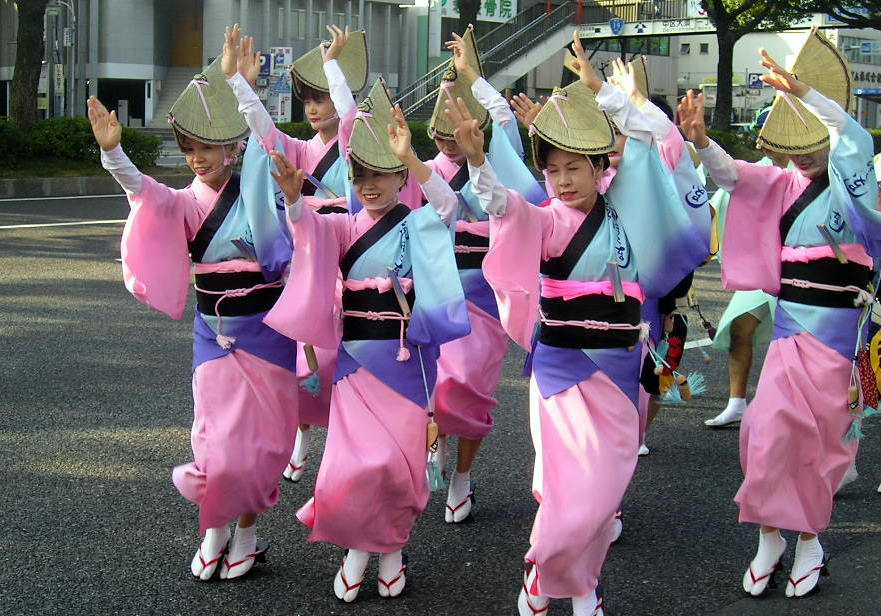
An awaodori dance troupe at Osu in Nagoya, Aichi

== Bon odori ==
Video of dancers in a bon odori festival in Adachi-ku, Tokyo

Bon odori is a type of folk dance performed during the Obon Festival. It was originally a dance to welcome the spirits of the dead. These dances and the music that accompanies them are different for every region of Japan. Usually, the bon dance involves people dancing around a yagura, a high wooden scaffold. The people move either counter clockwise or clockwise, away and towards the yagura. Sometimes they switch direction.

The movement and gestures in a bon dance often depict the history, work or geography of the region. For example, tankō bushi is a coal mining work song that originates from Miike Mine in Kyushu, and the movements in the dance depict digging, cart pushing and lantern hanging. Soran Bushi is a sea shanty, and the movements in the dance depict net dragging and luggage hoisting. Bon dances may employ the use of different utensils, such as fans, small towels and wooden hand clappers. For the hanagasa odori, the dancers use straw hats with flowers on them.

== Jiuta mai ==
Jiuta mai (地唄舞) (or kamigata mai) is a refined dance form that comes from the pleasure quarters in Osaka and Kyoto. The dance style is represented by classical elements of mai style such as fan movements, pantomime and circular movements. This form of dance is intended to be performed only by women.

== See also ==
- Glossary of Japanese theater (includes dance and performance arts)
- Contemporary dance in Japan
- Sword dance
