= Contemporary dance in Japan =

Contemporary Japanese dance draws on various traditional styles as well as Western classical and avant-garde forms, interpreted with the standards of Japanese schools. Many famous dance studios grew from training centres for Kabuki actor-dancers or derived from famous Kabuki families.

Western schools covered classical ballet, jazz dance, and modern dance and influenced the butoh avant-garde dance movement. Ballet was said to have replaced traditional Japanese arts, such as flower arrangement and the tea ceremony, in the hearts of young girls. Prima ballerina Morishita Yoko sat on the jury for the Prix de Lausanne Ballet Competition in 1989, held for the first time in Tokyo, marking the arrival of Japanese classical ballet in the international community. Horiuchi Gen, a 1980 Prix de Lausanne winner, became a major soloist with the New York City Ballet, and Japanese performers noted for their superb technique were members of many major international companies. Modern dance was performed early after World War II and was later taught by dancers such as Eguchi Takaya. The Tokyo Modern Dance School and the Ozawa Hisako Modern Dance Company also promoted avant-garde modern dance. A wide experimental range within modern dance occurred from which choreographer Teshigawara Saburo drew to create multifaceted works for his KARAS Company. Many female dancers drawing their art from butoh were trained by the Hanayagi school, whose top dancers performed internationally. Ichinohe Sachiko choreographed and performed traditional dances in Heian court costumes, characterized by the slow, formal, and elegant motions of this classical age of Japanese culture.

The vital avant-garde butoh dance was a major development after the war: at least five major schools performed in the 1985 Butoh Festival, and there were numerous creative offshoots. Hijikata Tatsumi was a dancer who experimented with different kinds of creative dance to capture expressive motions he considered expressly suited to the Japanese physiognomy and psyche. He combined eroticism, social criticism, and avant-garde theatre ideas, and he considered the body to be a repository for "stored memories", which could be metamorphosed into dance forms. His theories and choreography were carried on by a number of famous dancers, who eventually formed their own major companies, which were strong in the 1980s and toured abroad.

== See also ==
- Geta Dance Art
- Japanese traditional dance
