= Japanese-American life after World War II =

On February 19, 1942, shortly after Japan's surprise attack on Pearl Harbor in Hawaii, President Franklin D. Roosevelt signed Executive Order 9066 authorizing the forced removal of over 110,000 Japanese Americans from the West Coast and into internment camps for the duration of the war. The personal rights, liberties, and freedoms of Japanese Americans were suspended by the United States government. In the "relocation centers", internees were housed in tar-papered army-style barracks. Some individuals who protested their treatment were sent to a special camp at Tule Lake, California.

The unanimous Supreme Court decision Ex parte Endo in December 1944 ruled that the U.S. government could not continue to detain a citizen who was "concededly loyal" to the United States. Word of the upcoming ruling led to the rescinding of the exclusion orders and allowed Japanese Americans to return to the American West Coast starting in January 1945. Many Japanese Americans suffered harsh treatment after leaving the internment camps. Examples include exclusion from being hired by jobs in the LA county, and being shut out by the produce industry, which was the lifeblood of many Japanese Americans prior to WWII.

== Japanese-American Evacuation Claims Act ==
In 1948, President Harry S. Truman signed the Japanese-American Claims Act. This act was a way to compensate Japanese Americans for their economic losses due to their forced evacuation. Although some $38 million was paid out through provisions of the act, it would be largely ineffective even on the limited scope in which it operated.

== McCarran-Walter Act ==
When the war ended, the American opinion of Japanese was altered. Japan was in the process of rebuilding with the help of the U.S. military. Japanese became known for their intelligence, amiable relations, and hardworking ethic. The new perspective of this country changed American minds about Japanese. In 1952, this new opinion of the Japanese resulted in first-generation Japanese Americans receiving the right to become naturalized U.S. citizens with the McCarran-Walter Act.

== 1965 Immigration Act ==
The Immigration and Nationality Act amendments of 1965 eliminated the national origins quota that was established by the United States in the Immigration Act of 1924. Emanuel Celler proposed the 1965 Act, which was strongly backed by Senator Ted Kennedy. This legislation “created the foundation of today’s immigration law.”

== Congress’s investigation of WWII Japanese-American imprisonment ==
The Commission on Wartime Relocation and Internment of Civilians (CWRIC) was appointed by the U.S. Congress in 1980 to conduct an official governmental study into the internment of Japanese Americans during World War II. It concluded that the incarceration of Japanese Americans had not been justified by military necessity.

== Civil Liberties Act ==
The Civil Liberties Act of 1988 was an official apology made to Japanese Americans in 1988 by Congress. The act granted about US$20,000 to former internees who were still alive when the act was passed.

== Repudiation of Korematsu v. United States ==
In 2018, Chief Justice Roberts, in writing the majority opinion of the Supreme Court in Trump v. Hawaii, stated in obiter dictum that the 1944 decision Korematsu v. United States that upheld the constitutionality of Executive Order 9066 (authorizing the Japanese American Internment) was wrong, effectively disavowing the decision and indicating that a majority of the court no longer finds Korematsu persuasive. Roberts also added: "The forcible relocation of U.S. citizens to concentration camps, solely and explicitly on the basis of race, is objectively unlawful and outside the scope of Presidential authority."

== Timeline of life after World War II ==
- 1947: Wally Kaname Yonamine plays football for the San Francisco 49ers.
- 1947: Wataru Misaka plays basketball for the New York Knicks.
- 1952: The McCarran–Walter Act eliminates race as a basis for naturalization, allowing Issei to become US citizens.
- 1952: Tommy Kono (weightlifting), Yoshinobu Oyakawa (100-meter backstroke), and Ford Konno (1500-meter freestyle) each win gold medals and set records during the Summer Olympics in Helsinki.
- 1957: Miyoshi Umeki wins the Academy Award for Best Supporting Actress.
- 1957: James Kanno is elected as the first mayor of California's Fountain Valley.
- 1959: Daniel K. Inouye is elected to the United States House of Representatives, becoming the first Japanese American to serve in Congress.
- 1962: Minoru Yamasaki is awarded the contract to design the World Trade Center, becoming the first Japanese American architect to design a supertall skyscraper in the United States.
- 1963: Daniel K. Inouye becomes the first Japanese American in the United States Senate.
- 1965: Patsy T. Mink becomes the first woman of color in Congress.
- 1971: Norman Y. Mineta is elected mayor of San Jose, California, becoming the first Asian American mayor of a major U.S. city.
- 1972: Robert A. Nakamura produces Manzanar, the first personal documentary about internment.
- 1974: Fujio Matsuda becomes the first Asian-American president of a major American university, as president of the University of Hawaiʻi.
- 1974: George R. Ariyoshi becomes the first elected Japanese American governor of the State of Hawaiʻi.
- 1976: S. I. Hayakawa of California and Spark Matsunaga of Hawaiʻi become the second and third U.S. Senators of Japanese descent.
- 1976: Michi Weglyn publishes the book Years of Infamy: The Untold Story of America’s Concentration Camps, whose meticulous investigation of government documents and correspondence helped fuel the redress movement .
- 1977: Michiko (Miki) Gorman wins both the Boston and New York City marathons in the same year. It's her second victory in each race.
- 1978: Ellison S. Onizuka becomes the first Asian American astronaut. Onizuka was one of the seven astronauts to die in the Space Shuttle Challenger disaster in 1986.
- 1980: Congress creates the Commission on Wartime Relocation and Internment of Civilians to investigate internment during World War II.
- 1980: Eunice Sato becomes the first Asian-American female mayor of a major American city when she was elected mayor of Long Beach, California.
- 1983: The Commission on Wartime Relocation and Internment of Civilians reports that Japanese-American internment was not justified by military necessity and that internment was based on "race prejudice, war hysteria, and a failure of political leadership." The Commission recommends an official Government apology; redress payments of $20,000 to each of the survivors; and a public education fund to help ensure that this would not happen again.
- 1987: Charles J. Pedersen wins the Nobel Prize in Chemistry for his methods of synthesizing crown ethers
- 1988: President Ronald Reagan signs the Civil Liberties Act of 1988, apologizing for Japanese-American internment and providing reparations of $20,000 to each former internee who was still alive when the act was passed.
- 1992: The Japanese American National Museum opens in Little Tokyo, Los Angeles.
- 1992: Kristi Yamaguchi wins the Olympic gold medal and her second World Championship title in figure skating.
- 1994: Mazie K. Hirono is elected Lieutenant Governor of Hawaii, becoming the first Japanese immigrant elected state lieutenant governor of a state. Hirono later is elected in the U.S. House of Representatives.
- 1996: A. Wallace Tashima is nominated to the United States Court of Appeals for the Ninth Circuit and becomes the first Japanese American to serve as a judge of a United States court of appeals.
- 1998: Chris Tashima (son of A. Wallace Tashima) becomes the first U.S.-born Japanese American actor to win an Academy Award for his role in the film Visas and Virtue.
- 1999: U.S. Army General Eric Shinseki becomes the first Asian American to serve as chief of staff of a branch of the armed forces. Shinseki later served as Secretary of Veterans Affairs (2009–2014).
- 2000: Norman Y. Mineta becomes the first Asian American appointed to the United States Cabinet. He serves as Secretary of Commerce from 2000–2001 and Secretary of Transportation from 2001–2006.
- 2008: Yoichiro Nambu wins the Nobel Prize in Physics for his work on quantum chromodynamics and spontaneous symmetry breaking.
- 2010: Daniel K. Inouye becomes the highest ranking Asian American politician in U.S. history when he succeeds Robert Byrd as President pro tempore of the United States Senate.
- 2011: The Nisei Soldiers of World War II Congressional Gold Medal was awarded in recognition of the World War II service of the 442nd Regimental Combat Team, the 100th Infantry Battalion, and Nisei serving in the Military Intelligence Service on November 2, 2011.
- 2014: Shuji Nakamura wins the 2014 Nobel Prize in Physics for the invention of efficient blue light-emitting diodes.
- 2018: Chief Justice Roberts, in writing the majority opinion of the Supreme Court in Trump v. Hawaii, effectively repudiates the 1944 decision Korematsu v. United States that had upheld the constitutionality of Executive Order 9066.
- 2021: Syukuro Manabe wins the 2021 Nobel Prize in Physics for contributions to the physical modeling of earth's climate, quantifying its variability, and predictions of climate change.

== See also ==
- Asian American Movement
- Bainbridge Island Japanese American Exclusion Memorial
- Day of Remembrance (Japanese Americans)
- Empty Chair Memorial
- Fred Korematsu Day
- Mitsuye Endo
- Go for Broke Monument
- Japanese American Internment Museum
- Japanese American Memorial to Patriotism During World War II
- Japanese American Museum of San Jose
- Japanese American National Museum
- Japanese American redress and court cases
- The Long Journey Home (ceremonial event)
- Sakura Square
- Japanese-American life before World War II
- Japanese-American service in World War II
