= Japanese American redress and court cases =

Asian-American movement to obtain reparations for their mistreatment during WWII

The following article focuses on the movement to obtain redress for the internment of Japanese Americans during World War II, and significant court cases that have shaped civil and human rights for Japanese Americans and other minorities. These cases have been the cause and/or catalyst to many changes in United States law. But mainly, they have resulted in adjusting the perception of Asian immigrants in the eyes of the American government.

== Background ==
Shortly after the Japanese attack on Pearl Harbor on December 7, 1941, President Franklin D. Roosevelt issued Executive Order 9066, which authorized the forced removal and confinement of 120,000 Japanese Americans living on the West Coast of the United States. Some 5,500 Issei men arrested by the FBI immediately after Pearl Harbor were already in Justice Department or Army custody, and 5,000 were able to "voluntarily" relocate outside the exclusion zone; the remaining Japanese Americans were "evacuated" from their homes and placed in isolated concentration camps over the spring of 1942. Two-thirds were U.S. citizens and half were under age 18.

In 1944, the Supreme Court upheld the constitutionality of the forced eviction, when Fred Korematsu's challenge to his conviction for violating an exclusion order was struck down (see below). The Court limited its decision to the validity of the orders to leave the West Coast military area, avoiding the issue of the incarceration of U.S. citizens.

In 1948, the Evacuation Claims Act provided some compensation for property losses, but the act required documentation that many former inmates had lost during their removal and excluded lost opportunities, wages or interest from its calculations. Less than 24,000 filed a claim, and most received only a fraction of the losses they claimed.

== Wartime court cases ==
=== Hirabayashi v. United States, 1943 ===
Gordon Hirabayashi was convicted in terms of the violation of a curfew imposed at the time, which proclaimed that;

all persons of Japanese ancestry residing in such an area be within their place of residence daily between the hours of 8:00 p. m. and 6:00 a.m.

Hirabayashi, who was a student of the University of Washington at the time,

felt that the curfew violated his Fifth Amendment right of due process. He disobeyed it.

He further did not report for confinement to the bus that was supposed to take him to the camp he had been assigned to, which led to the charges against him becoming more severe. It was only in 1987 that the charges against Hirabayashi were dropped by the Supreme Court:

It took 40 years for a legal scholar reviewing declassified government documents to unearth memos sent by the government lawyers arguing before the Supreme Court to their superiors. In the memos, they complained that they were being forced to tell lies in court about the threat posed by the Japanese

— Hirabayashi Versus the United States, 2005.

The discussion this case sparked involved two key issues. The first was one of power, and if the curfew law was unconstitutional. The second issue was the question of racial discrimination, a constant theme within all of these cases.

The supreme court ruled that the curfew policy was constitutional and that it is merely for "protective measure."

=== Ex parte Endo, 1944 ===
Mitsuye Endo was a Nisei who had been working as a stenographer at the Department of Motor Vehicles in Sacramento, the capital of California. Following the Japanese attack on Pearl Harbor, she was fired from her job and forced to move to the Tule Lake Reolocation Center with her family. Later, they were transferred to the Topaz War Relocation Center in Utah. Like the other one hundred thousand Japanese Americans who were removed from their homes and sources of livelihood, Endo also found dismissed from her job, without any hope of reinstatement or return to her home in California.

Endo hired a lawyer, James Purcell, to represent her legal protest against her illegal relocation and dismissal. Purcell and Endo filed a habeas corpus in court as a representation of her plea. The writ requested that Endo be released from the relocation camp so that she could challenge the terms of her dismissal. However, the court agreed to releasing Endo outside the West Coast area only: The U.S. government responded by offering to release Endo outside the West Coast rather than test the constitutionality of detention. Endo bravely refused the offer and remained confined without charge for another two years as she pursued her case. ("Mitsuye Endo Persevering for Justice")

It was two years later that the U.S. Supreme Court decreed that persons of Japanese descent could not be held in confinement without proof of their disloyalty, stating that

detention in Relocation Centers of persons of Japanese ancestry regardless of loyalty is not only unauthorized by the Congress or the Executive, but it is another example of the unconstitutional resort to racism in the entire evacuation program

— Mitsuye Endo Persevering for Justice

and Endo and thousands of her fellow detainees were allowed to return to their homes on the Pacific Coast.

This case was special for a few reasons. First, Endo was a woman, while the other three internment cases dealt with Japanese American men. And secondly, this case was different because it arose from a habeas corpus petition.

=== Korematsu v. United States, 1944 ===
A case that focused on Japanese Americans who were denied citizenship and forced to move is the case of Korematsu v. United States. Fred Korematsu refused to obey the wartime order to leave his home and report to a relocation camp for Japanese Americans. He was arrested and convicted. After losing in the Court of Appeals, he appealed to the United States Supreme Court, challenging the constitutionality of the deportation order.

The Supreme Court upheld the order excluding persons of Japanese ancestry from the West Coast war zone during World War II. Three justices dissented.

Justice Hugo Black, writing for the majority, said that legal restrictions on the rights of a single racial group will always be:

"suspect" and that "courts must subject them to the most rigid scrutiny." However, they are not necessarily unconstitutional. The exclusion order imposed hardships upon a large group of American citizens. But hardships are part of war. Compulsory exclusion of large groups of citizens from their homes, except under circumstances of direst emergency and peril, is inconsistent with our basic governmental institutions. But when under conditions of modern warfare our shores are threatened by hostile forces, the power to protect must be commensurate with the threatened danger.

In Justice Owen Roberts' dissent, he said:

[This] is the case of convicting a citizen as a punishment for not submitting to imprisonment in a concentration camp, based on his ancestry, and solely because of his ancestry, without evidence or inquiry concerning his loyalty and good disposition towards the United States.

Justice Robert Jackson said that comparable burdens were not imposed upon descendants of the other nationalities such as Germans and Italians with whom the United States was also at war.

== Redress movement ==
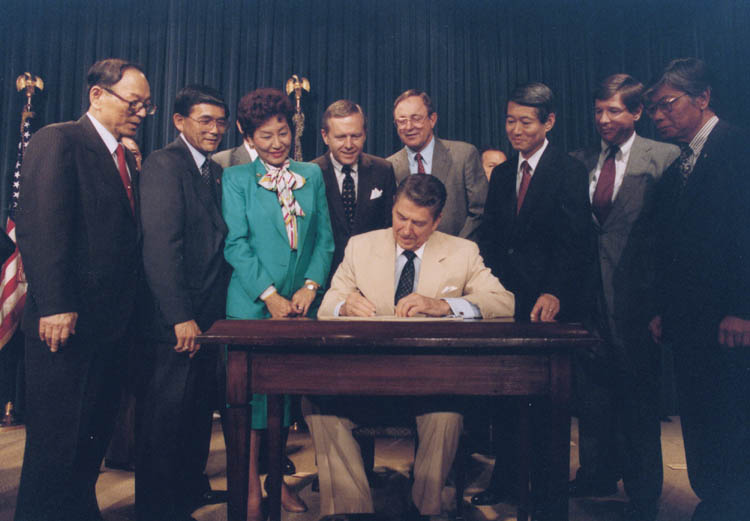
President Reagan signs the Civil Liberties Act into law. Looking on, left to right: Senator Spark Matsunaga, Representative Norman Mineta, Representative Patsy Sakai, Senator Pete Wilson, Representative Don Young, Representative Bob Matsui, Representative Bill Lowery, JACL President Harry Kajihara.

Swept up in the larger civil rights movement and ethnic pride of the 1960s and 1970s, a group of Nikkei activists began pushing for a reexamination of their parents' and grandparents' wartime experiences. Many had only recently learned of the incarceration, as their elders had remained hesitant to discuss the issue openly, and a debate over whether the community was owed reparations began to spread.

In 1970, the Japanese American Citizens League endorsed a resolution to urge Congress to compensate each camp survivor for each day they had spent in confinement (although the organization committed no resources to actual lobbying). Redress efforts stalled for several years due to internal divisions and external opposition. In 1979, the JACL's National Committee for Redress proposed the creation of a federal commission to investigate the incarceration, but Seattle and Chicago chapter members, favoring an immediate push for monetary compensation over the national leadership's more bureaucratic approach, left to form the National Council for Japanese American Redress (NCJAR). The NCJAR lobbied in support of Washington State Congressman Mike Lowry's bill to compensate camp survivors, but the bill was killed in committee. The following year, the JACL, with help from Senators Daniel Inouye and Spark Matsunaga, pushed a bill through Congress to create their investigative commission, and President Jimmy Carter appointed the Commission on Wartime Relocation and Internment of Civilians (CWRIC). Meanwhile, younger and more left-leaning redress activists formed the National Coalition for Redress/Reparations (NCRR), and worked to open the CWRIC hearings to Japanese Americans outside the elite, non-confrontational cohort favored by JACL leadership. After the hearings, NCRR activists continued to wage a grass roots campaign for redress, while the JACL focused on passing legislation that would implement the CWRIC's recommendations and NCJAR turned its efforts to a federal lawsuit that would force the government to compensate former camp inmates. The class-action suit was ultimately unsuccessful, but the work of all three organizations contributed to the passage of the Civil Liberties Act of 1988.

=== Timeline ===
- 1970: Edison Uno introduces a resolution to push Congress to provide reparations to camp survivors, which the JACL endorses.
- 1976: Michi Weglyn publishes the book Years of Infamy: The Untold Story of America’s Concentration Camps, whose meticulous investigation of government documents and correspondence helped fuel the redress movement
- January 1979: The JACL's redress committee agrees to lobby for a federal commission to investigate the causes and effects of the wartime incarceration of Japanese Americans. The decision to shift focus from monetary compensation to legislation is controversial and deepens existing rifts in the organization.
- May 1979: Dissident JACL members form the National Council for Japanese American redress.
- August 1979: JACL-backed bills for the creation of an investigative committee are introduced in the House and Senate.
- November 28, 1979: Congressman Mike Lowry introduces an NCJAR-backed bill to grant $15,000 plus $15 for each day spent in confinement to former inmates.
- 1980: The National Coalition for Redress/Reparations is established.
- July 31, 1980: President Carter approves the creation of the Commission on Wartime Relocation and Internment of Civilians.
- July to December 1981: The CWRIC holds eleven hearings in ten U.S. cities. More than 750 provide personal testimony of their confinement during World War II. For many it is the first time they have spoken of their wartime experiences.
- February 24, 1983: The CWRIC issues its final report, titled Personal Justice Denied. The report concludes that the wartime incarceration was caused by "race prejudice, war hysteria and a failure of political leadership," and recommends a formal apology, the creation of a foundation to educate the public about the injustice, and $20,000 in reparations paid to each former inmate.
- March 16, 1983: NCJAR files a class-action lawsuit against the government, calling for $220,000 to each camp survivor (a total of $27 billion) for "constitutional violations, loss of property and earnings, personal injury, and pain and suffering."
- 1984 to 1985: The government's motion to dismiss the lawsuit is granted, and NCJAR files an appeal with the District of Columbia Court of Appeals. The court rules in favor of NCJAR, but reduces the case's original 22 causes of action to one and maintains the lower court's stance on sovereign immunity.
- 1986: The Supreme Court allows NCJAR lawyers to present arguments for their lawsuit but eventually orders the case be heard in the Federal Circuit Court of Appeals instead.
- September 17, 1987: H.R. 442, named after the famed all-Japanese combat unit, is brought to the House floor for discussion and eventually passes 243 to 141.
- May 11, 1988: The Federal Circuit Court of Appeals dismisses the NCJAR lawsuit.
- August 10, 1988: President Ronald Reagan signs the Civil Liberties Act into law. The act's provisions incorporate the recommendations outlined in Personal Justice Denied.
- October 9, 1990: A ceremony is held to present the first redress checks to nine Issei.
- 1993: Issuance of redress checks is completed. A total of 82,219 former camp inmates received reparations.

== Coram Nobis cases ==
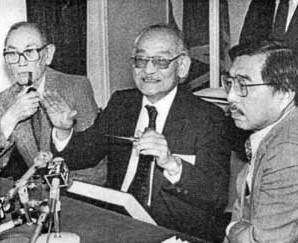
Gordon Hirabayashi, Minoru Yasui, and Fred Korematsu in 1986

In 1981, during testimony before the CWRIC, the Nisei attorney Frank Chuman proposed using the writ of coram nobis to overturn the convictions of Korematsu, Hirabayashi, and Yasui. Shortly thereafter, scholar Peter Irons and attorney Dale Minami submitted a coram nobis petition, based on recently discovered evidence of official misconduct. These proceedings would eventually nullify the convictions of the 1940s.

== Hohri v. the United States, 1986 ==
Another case that took place during the redress movement was that of Hohri versus the U.S. The plaintiffs in this case were nineteen Japanese Americans and their descendants, who brought

civil actions against the United States seeking declaratory relief and compensation for injuries sustained when the detainees were forced to evacuate their homes and relocate to internment camps during the Second World War

— Leigh 1986, p. 648.

William Hohri was living in San Francisco when he was removed and forcibly incarcerated during World War II in Manzanar. He filed the case on behalf of all the incarceration victims, claiming that apart from injuries, the prisoners suffered "summary removal from their homes, imprisonment in racially segregated prison camps, and mass deprivations of their constitutional rights" (Legacies of Incarceration, 2002). Although the case was dismissed in 1988, it is representative of many of the claims for redress made by Japanese Americans.

== See also ==
- Asian American movement
- Bainbridge Island Japanese American Exclusion Memorial
- Day of Remembrance (Japanese Americans)
- Empty Chair Memorial
- Fred Korematsu Day
- Fred T. Korematsu Institute for Civil Rights and Education
- Go for Broke Monument
- Japanese-American Claims Act
- Japanese American Internment Museum
- Japanese-American life after World War II
- Japanese American Memorial to Patriotism During World War II
- Japanese-American service in World War II
- The Long Journey Home (ceremonial event)
- Sakura Square
