= Japanese American National Library =

Library in San Francisco, California

Coordinates: 37.786509°N 122.427058°W

- Founded: 1969; 57 years ago
- Headquarters: San Francisco, United States
- Location: United States
- Website: janlibrary.org

The Japanese American National Library (全米日系アメリカ人図書館, Zenbei Nikkei Amerikajin Toshokan) is a private non-lending library and resource center in San Francisco's Japantown for the collection and preservation of materials relating to Japanese Americans. It has been in operation since 1969.

The library's collection consists of the following:

- Books related to Japanese-Americans and Asian-Americans
- Periodicals, including magazines, newsletters, journals, newspapers, and newspaper clippings.
- Reference materials and general information about Japanese-American and Asian-American organizations, as well as information about Japanese-American artists and writers

The Japanese American National Library also contains an extensive archival collection. The most notable collection includes the archives of the Japanese American Citizens League Legislative Education Committee (JACL-LEC), an organization created to promote redress that ultimately became the Civil Liberties Act of 1988.

== History ==
A national Japanese American Library began in 1967 as an idea shared between two individuals, Karl Matsushita and Tetsuden Kashima. However, the project did not come to fruition until 1969 with the onset of strikes throughout San Francisco State, wherein students demanded the creation of ethnic studies programs at the university. Karl Matsushita and Tetsuden Kashima began compiling basic curriculum materials, with the bulk of the early collection coming from donations made by those involved in the project. These funds and saving were given to help the library buy books, while additional materials were bequeathed to the library from local newspapers and authors.

After its relatively humble origin, the Japanese American Library under the leadership of their director Matsushita was able to move the library's location to a new space in the Nichibei Kai building in San Francisco's Japantown. Prior to this move much of the collection had been housed within personal garages and basements due to limited space. However, the continuously increasing collection resulted in the library have to more again in 1987 to its current location at 1619 Sutter Street, on the first floor of the Hinode Towers.

The library is dedicated to collecting and preserving materials and objects which pertain to the history and identity of the Japanese American people. They regard their primary purpose as establishing a library/resource center to preserve Japanese American cultural heritage, promote interest in Japanese American heritage, provide information relating to the needs of the Japanese American community, as well as serve as a bridge between the Japanese community and the general American public. Today the Japanese American National Library contains one of the most important and comprehensive collections on the history of the Japanese in the United States.

== See also ==
- Densho: The Japanese American Legacy Project
- Japanese American National Museum
- Japanese American Citizens League
- Japanese American Committee for Democracy
- History of the Japanese in San Francisco
