= Grayce Uyehara =

Japanese-American activist

- Born: Grayce Ritsu Kaneda; July 4, 1919; Stockton, California, U.S.
- Died: June 22, 2014 (aged 94); Mount Holly, New Jersey, U.S.
- Education: University of the Pacific; BA, St. Cloud State Teachers College; MSW, University of Pennsylvania
- Occupation: Social worker
- Employer: Japanese American Citizens League
- Known for: Civil rights activism
- Spouse: Hiroshi Uyehara
- Children: Paul, Christopher, Laurence and Lisa

Grayce Uyehara, née Kaneda, (July 4, 1919 – June 22, 2014) was a Japanese-American social worker and activist who led the campaign for a formal government apology for Japanese-American internment during World War II.

== Early life ==
Born Grayce Ritsu Kaneda in Stockton, California, she was the second of seven children and part of the nisei generation. She was a student at the University of the Pacific, majoring in music, when she and her family were imprisoned in the Rohwer internment camp in Arkansas after the signing of Executive Order 9066. After securing her release through a program allowing some internees to attend college, Uyehara moved to Minnesota and studied at St. Cloud State Teachers College, now St. Cloud State University. She then moved to Philadelphia and married a fellow former internee, Hiroshi Uyehara. While living in West Chester, Pennsylvania, the Uyeharas organized the Philadelphia chapter of the Japanese American Citizens League (JACL), where Grayce became one of its first women leaders nationwide.

== Career ==
While an activist, Uyehara worked as a social worker. After her retirement, she volunteered as national director of the Legislative Education Committee, the JACL's lobbying arm. Their efforts led to President Ronald Reagan's signing of the Civil Liberties Act of 1988, which issued a formal apology for internment and provided reparations for former internees. She then chaired the JACL Legacy Fund campaign, which raised over $5 million to support other JACL programs. In 2014, she was honored by Asian Americans United with its Standing Up For Justice Award.

== Death ==
After a brief illness at Virtua Memorial Hospital in Mount Holly, New Jersey, Uyehara died on June 22, 2014. She was remembered by other Japanese Americans for her focus and effectiveness as an activist, "the heart and soul of redress."
