= Michi Weglyn =

American author (1926-1999)

Michi Nishiura Weglyn
- Born: Michiko Nishiura; November 29, 1926; Stockton, California, U.S.
- Died: April 25, 1999 (aged 72); New York City, New York, U.S.
- Occupation: Writer
- Spouse: Walter Matthys Weglyn
- Parent(s): Tomojiro and Misao Nishiura

Michi Nishiura Weglyn (Japanese: 西浦 道子, November 29, 1926 – April 25, 1999) was an American author. Her book Years of Infamy: The Untold Story of America’s Concentration Camps, which was published in 1976, helped fuel a movement leading to reparations for Japanese Americans interned during World War II. She was awarded the Anisfield-Wolf Book Award for this work in 1977. Weglyn was also a vocal advocate for those denied redress under the Civil Liberties Act of 1988 and for the more than 2,200 Japanese Peruvians who were taken from their homes by the U.S. government and used in a hostage exchange program with Japan.

== Biography ==
=== Early years ===
Michiko Nishiura was born into a farming family in Stockton, California, in 1926, the eldest of two daughters to Japanese immigrants Tomojiro and Misao Nishiura. The family worked as tenant farmers in Brentwood, and Weglyn attended Liberty Union High School, receiving a citizenship award from the American Legion in 1940. In May 1942, following the signing of Executive Order 9066, she was interned with her family at the Turlock Assembly Center, before being transferred to the Gila River War Relocation Center in Arizona three months later.

While in Gila River, she attended the camp school, Butte High, and kept busy with various extracurricular activities, leading a Girl Scouts troop, the Butte Forensics League, and a young women's association. She graduated in 1944 and, after receiving a full scholarship to Mount Holyoke College, left camp for Massachusetts.

Weglyn attended Mount Holyoke from 1944 to 1945, majoring in biology, but a bout with tuberculosis forced her to enter a sanatorium in New Jersey and withdraw from college without a diploma. Her mother and sister moved to New Jersey to work at Seabrook Farms in January 1945, and Weglyn joined them after finishing her treatment. She later attended Barnard College in 1947 and 1948. In 1949, she suffered another bout of tuberculosis and once again had to seek treatment at a sanatorium.

Weglyn then moved to New York City, where she met her husband, Walter Weglyn, a Jewish refugee from the Netherlands, and the couple married in 1950. Walter Weglyn had been one of the only Jewish children from his hometown to survive the Nazi holocaust, and is credited for encouraging his wife into writing the book "Years of Infamy". Of him, Michi would later write, "Walter is my most exacting critic and mentor."

During the 1950s and 1960s, Weglyn became a designer and manufacturer of theatrical costumes, and she worked for the Perry Como Show from 1957 to 1966. During her eight years with the show, she became the first and only Japanese American of the era to achieve national prominence in theatrical costume design.

=== Researching for and publication of "Years of Infamy" ===
During the late 1960s, Weglyn began work on the landmark Years of Infamy: The Untold Story of America’s Concentration Camps. Published in 1976, it detailed U.S. governmental misconduct toward Japanese Americans following the Japanese attack on Pearl Harbor, and offered a staunch rebuttal of the military necessity argument for incarceration. Weglyn also highlighted issues that had not been covered in previous works, such as protest movements that had developed in camp and the internment of Japanese Latin Americans in U.S. concentration camps. In the preface to the book, Weglyn wrote that she hoped that it would serve as a reminder to readers of the "fragility of their rights" and as a warning that those "who say it can never happen again are probably wrong."

The book Years of Infamy would win one of the Anisfield-Wolf Book Awards in 1977 and helped launch the movement that led to reparations for Japanese Americans interned during World War II.

=== Later years ===
Following the book's publication, Weglyn became an advocate for Japanese Americans denied redress under the Civil Liberties Act of 1988 and for Japanese Peruvians who had been taken from their homes by the U.S. government and used in a hostage exchange program with Japan. For her work, Weglyn received honorary doctorates from Hunter College, Mount Holyoke College, and California State Polytechnic University, Pomona.

Weglyn's husband Walter died in 1995. Weglyn died of cancer in 1999 in New York City at the age of 72.

== See also ==
- Internment of Japanese Americans
- Japanese American redress and court cases
