= National Japanese American Veterans Memorial Court =

Memorial site in Los Angeles, California, United States

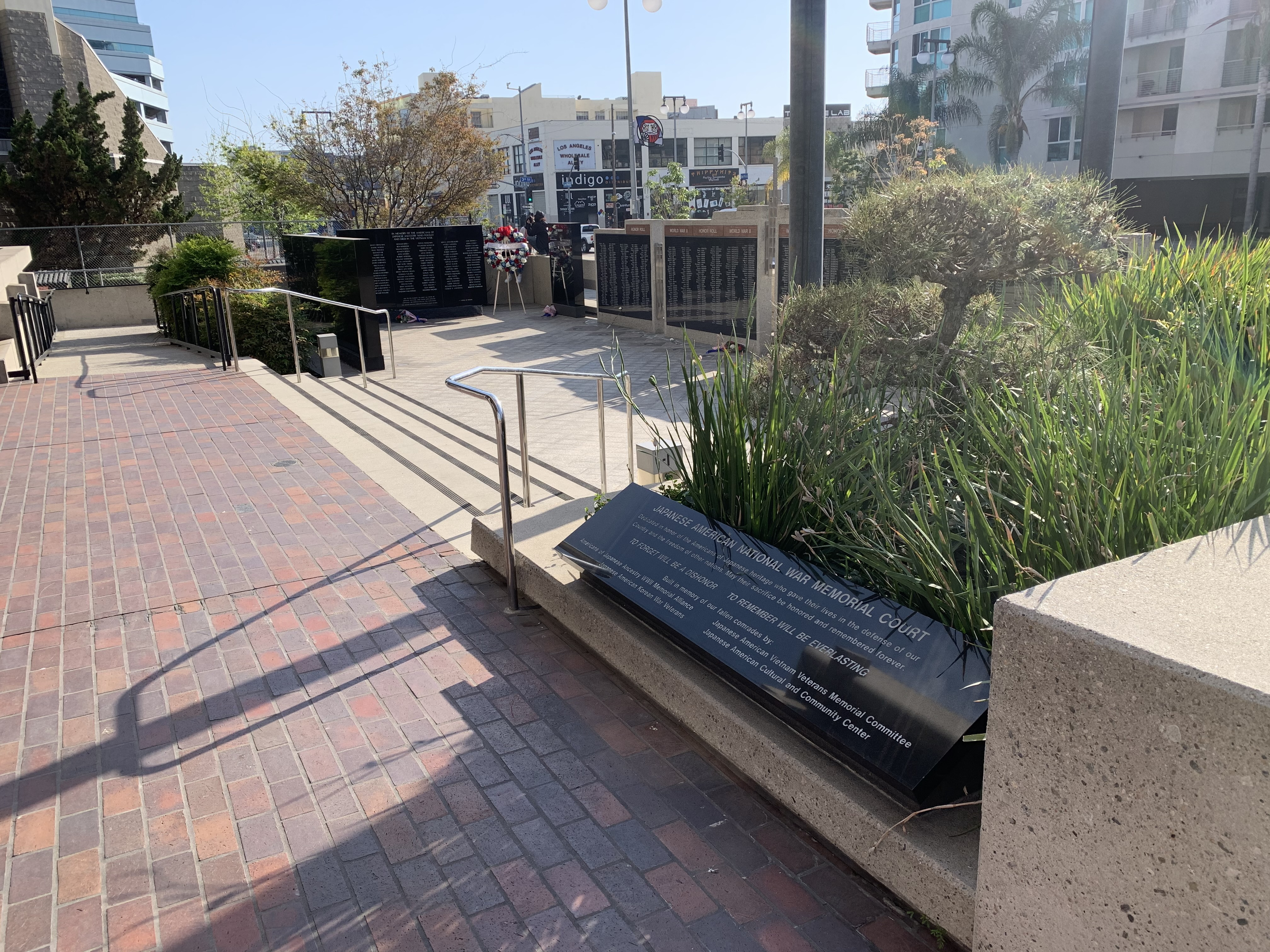
- 34°2′52″N 118°14′29″W
- Location: 244 San Pedro St, Los Angeles, California 90012
- Beginning date: 1987
- Dedicated date: 11 November 1995
- Dedicated to: Japanese American veterans of World War II, Korea, Vietnam, Iraq, and Afghanistan
- Website: https://www.jaccc.org/memorial-court

The National Japanese American Veterans Memorial Court (Japanese: 日系米国人退役軍人慰霊碑, Nikkei Beikokujin Taiekigunjin Ireihi) is a national memorial court in Los Angeles, California, honoring the bravery and sacrifice of Japanese American service members lost in service to the United States.

Of the approximately 12,000 names recognized, conflicts include the Spanish–American War, World War II, Korea, Vietnam, Grenada, Iraq, and Afghanistan.

The memorial is maintained by and located adjacent to the Japanese American Cultural & Community Center (Japanese: 日米文化会館) in Little Tokyo.

== Description ==
The National Japanese American Veterans Memorial Court was inspired by the Vietnam Veterans Memorial in Washington D.C., consisting of 18 black granite slabs, on which the names of almost 12,000 Japanese American are carved.

Los Angeles County Superior Court Judge Vincent Okamoto, a decorated veteran with the 25th ID during Vietnam, was a driving force in the creation of the memorial.

Planning for the memorial began in the summer of 1987 by the Japanese American Vietnam Veterans' Memorial Committee in Los Angeles, created with the goal of constructing a memorial to honor Japanese American veterans who were killed in action or were listed as missing in action in Vietnam.

During the Vietnam War, unlike in World War II and Korea, the United States military had become integrated, while the children of interracial marriages were coming of age in greater numbers, and the process of distinguishing Japanese ancestry among those with non-Japanese fathers or who had been adopted proved difficult. Enlistment and casualty records were of little assistance and frequently inaccurate, occasionally listing Japanese Americans as "Indonesian" or "Eskimo". This made it impossible to find every service member of Japanese ancestry in the Vietnam War, and the committee made the difficult decision to exclude those individuals not readily verifiable as of Japanese ancestry. The committee began manually sorting through the list of all 58,159 names on the Vietnam Veterans Memorial for last names that were of Japanese origin.

It would be almost seven years before the committee was able to locate a suitable location to begin construction. During that time, the committee was able to identify 116 individuals who were either KIA or MIA with Japanese ancestry. The Japanese American Cultural & Community Center agreed to host the memorial on their property at 244 San Pedro Street. This initial Vietnam memorial was dedicated on Veteran's Day, 11 November 1995.

The base of the memorial bears the following inscription:

Due to the inability to verify all those of Japanese ancestry only those with Japanese surnames are represented on this monument. The rest remain forever etched in our hearts.

In May 1997, the names of 251 Japanese Americans killed in the Korean War joined the 116 Vietnam era names on a set of black granite slabs perpendicular to the Vietnam set, while the list of over 800 World War II era names was added on another group of granite slabs across from the Korean names in February 2000. The additions were made possible due to the hard work of Japanese American Korean War Veterans the Americans of Japanese Ancestry WWII Alliance.

As America again found itself in war, another slab was added to include the names of those lost in Grenada, Iraq, Afghanistan, and aboard the USS Maine precipitating the Spanish–American War in 1898, paying tribute to the patriotism and sacrifice of Japanese Americans for over a century of service to America.

Every spring and fall, local youths from the community volunteer in a “Spit & Polish” event to help clean and maintain the memorial while also learning about some of the individuals listed, and every fall, the Nisei Week Queen and her court pay their respects to the men, many who were not much older than the girls themselves when they sacrificed their lives for the community.

== See also ==
- Bainbridge Island Japanese American Exclusion Memorial
- Day of Remembrance (Japanese Americans)
- Densho: The Japanese American Legacy Project
- Empty Chair Memorial
- Fred Korematsu Day
- Go for Broke Monument
- Harada House
- Japanese American Memorial to Patriotism During World War II
- Sakura Square
