= Fumiko Hayashida =

Japanese American activist

Fukimo Hayashida holding daughter Natalie in 1942 at start of Internment

Fumiko Hayashida née Nishinaka (Japanese: 林田 文子, January 21, 1911 – November 2, 2014) was an American activist, originally from Bainbridge Island, Washington, who became one of the first Japanese Americans to be interned in March 1942. Hayashida was the subject of a Seattle Post-Intelligencer photograph which shows her, 31-years-old, holding her sleeping 13-month-old daughter, Natalie, while waiting to board a ferry from Bainbridge Island to the mainland with other Japanese American internees. The photo became an iconic image of the plight of approximately 120,000 Japanese Americans who were interned during World War II following the signing of Executive Order 9066. However, the identity of the woman in the photograph remained unknown for decades. She was known only as "Mystery Girl" or "Mystery Lady" until the 1990s, when researchers at the Smithsonian Institution uncovered her identity and tracked her down.

Hayashida was born on Bainbridge Island in 1911 to Tomakichi Nishinaka, a strawberry farmer, and Tomiye Fujita. Hayashida attended school in Japan for a short time, and graduated from Bainbridge Island High School. She married Saburo Hayashida in 1939 in Kitsap County, Washington; the couple had two children in Washington and one while imprisoned in Manzanar, where the family was held for a year. After Manzanar, the family was moved to the Minidoka internment camp in Idaho to be closer to relatives and friends. Upon release, the Hayashidas returned to Washington, to live first on Bainbridge Island, then in Seattle.

In 2006, Hayashida testified in favor of a proposed memorial for Japanese American internees on Bainbridge Island before a U.S. congressional committee. The Bainbridge Island Japanese American Exclusion Memorial was opened in 2011.
