= Day of Remembrance (Japanese Americans) =

Day commemorating the Japanese American internment during World War II

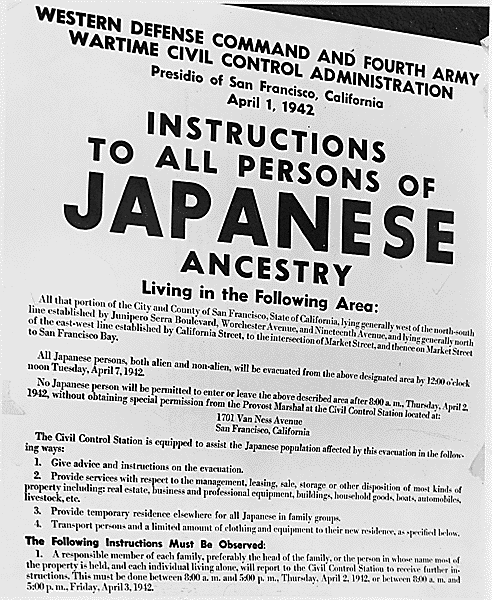
- (April 1 orders, based on legislation signed on February 19, 1942)
- Official name: Day of Remembrance
- Observed by: Primarily states within the United States
- Type: National
- Significance: Commemoration of Japanese Americans who were affected by internment during World War II
- Observances: Gathering, commence, discussion, activism, art/history exhibits, brief history
- Date: February 11
- Frequency: Annual
- Related to: Incarceration of Japanese Americans, World War II, Executive Order 9066, Franklin D. Roosevelt

The Day of Remembrance (DOR, Japanese: 追憶の日, Tsuioku no Hi) is a day of commemoration for the incarceration of Japanese Americans during World War II. It is a day for Americans of Japanese descent to reflect upon the consequences of Executive Order 9066. The Day of Remembrance also creates a space for the facilitation of dialogue and informing the public about the repercussions of such government action. Events in numerous U.S. states, especially in the West Coast, are held on or near February 19, the day in 1942 that Executive Order 9066 was signed by President Franklin D. Roosevelt, requiring internment of all Americans of Japanese ancestry. Areas where people of Japanese descent were forced to relocate included Arizona, Colorado, Idaho, Utah, Wyoming, and Arkansas. There are events held in each of these states as well. Events are not only relegated to the Western United States and it is widely observed in other areas of the United States such as Alaska, Chicago, Philadelphia, New York City, and New England.

== Presidential proclamation and reception to proclamation ==
In 2022, President Joe Biden issued a presidential proclamation declaring February 19, 2022, as the national Day of Remembrance of Japanese American Incarceration During World War II.

Congresswoman Doris Matsui released a statement noting that on Day of Remembrance, "The Japanese American community comes together to not only reflect, but to tell our story, teach others, and lift up the voices of our community," and noted that all Americans "Share the charge to ensure that our country not only learns from, but never forgets its past."

== Observance ==
Day of Remembrance is observed across the United States. General practices and activities include a day of commemoration, remembering those affected by Executive Order 9066 and a brief history of the events of Japanese internment. It can also include panel discussions, speeches, presentations, art walks, film observance, general activism and firsthand accounts.

=== Washington ===
The first Day of Remembrance, observing the day that Executive Order 9066 was signed and authorizing the Japanese American internment, was in the state of Washington on November 25, 1978, organized by the Evacuation Redress Committee. Co-sponsors included thirty churches, veterans' groups, and other social organizations, as well as the national Japanese American Citizens League (JACL). The event took place mainly at the Puyallup fairgrounds, which had served in 1942 as the assembly center named Camp Harmony. Although initially resistant, the board of the Western Washington Fair ultimately voted unanimously to allow the event to use the fairgrounds free of charge. The National Guard provided several large trucks similar to those used in 1942 to lead a caravan from Sicks' Stadium in Seattle to Puyallup, replicating the route taken by some of the internees. One of the key organizers of the first day of remembrance was Chinese-American writer, Frank Chin.

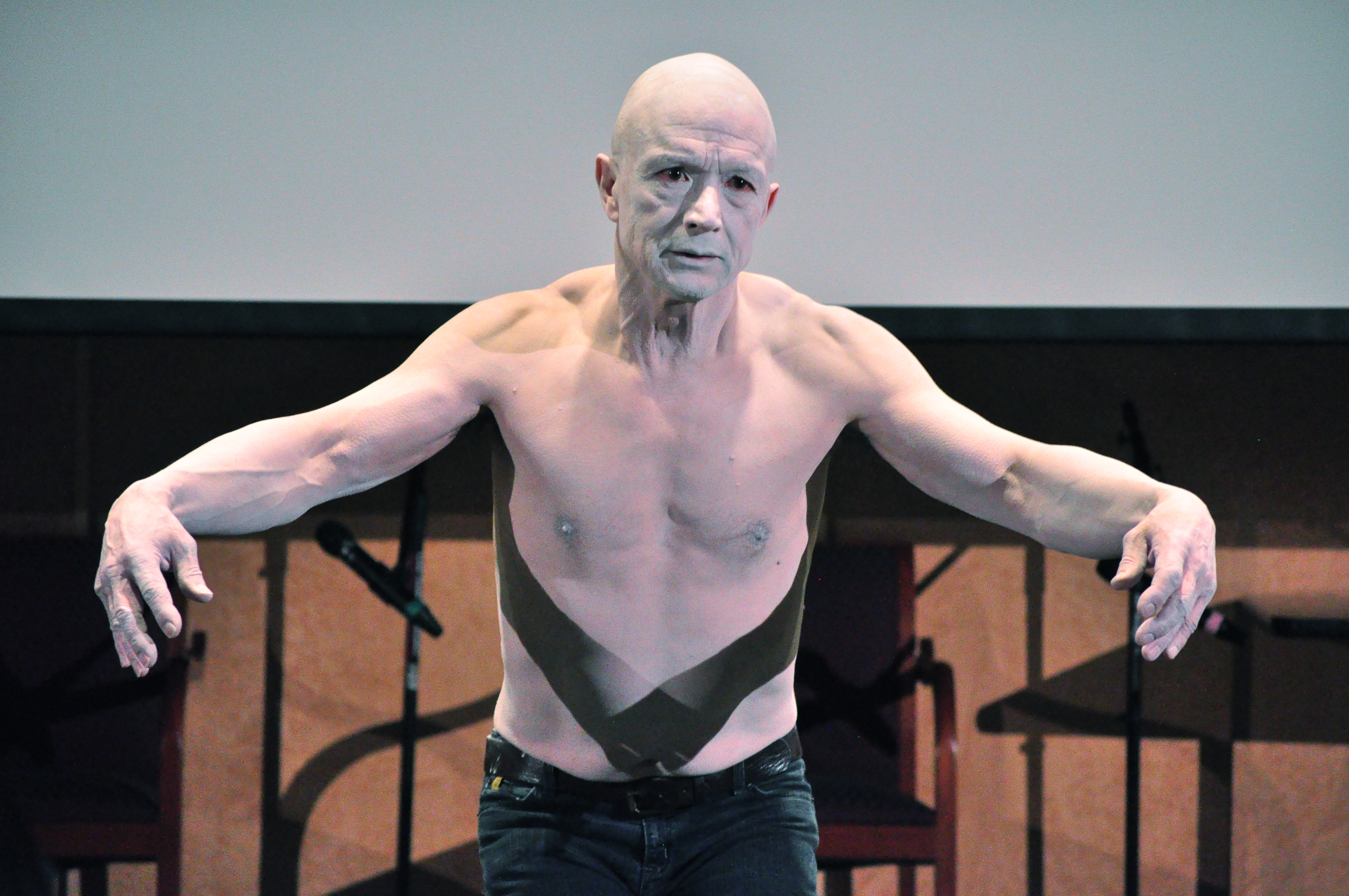
Jay Hirabayashi performs a butoh dance piece in memory of his parents, Gordon and Esther Hirabayashi, at a Day of Remembrance event in Seattle, Washington, February 22, 2014.

The University of Washington Department of American Ethnic Studies held its first Day of Remembrance program in 1997, and has held such a program all but three of the years since. At the 2008 ceremony, called The Long Journey Home, the university granted honorary baccalaureate degrees to all 449 of their former Japanese American students who had been affected by Executive Order 9066.

The state of Washington has officially recognized the DOR since 2003.

=== Oregon ===
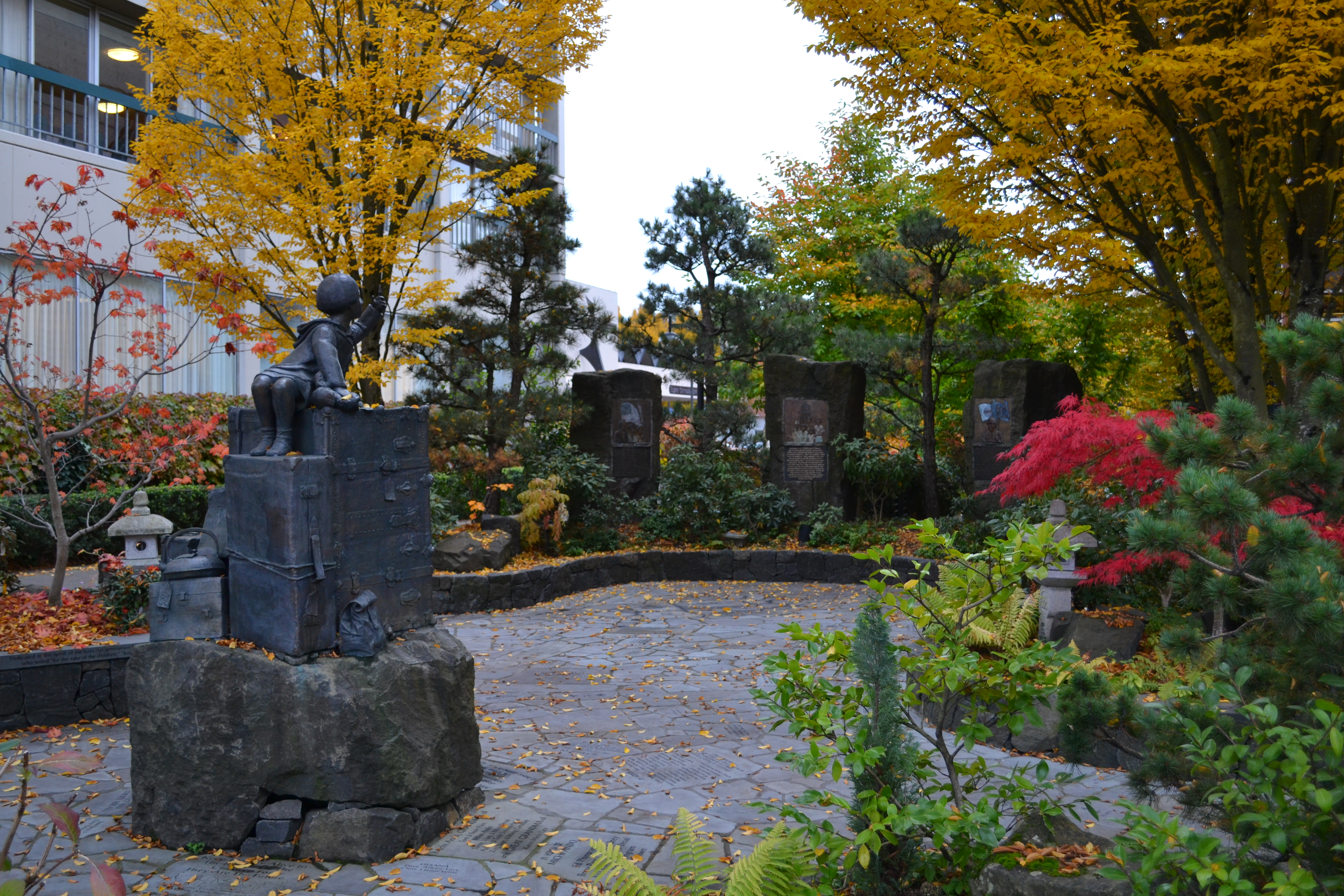
Japanese American Memorial (Eugene, Oregon)

The first Day of Remembrance event in Oregon occurred February 17, 1979, less than three months after the initial Washington event. Like the Washington event, it was held at a detention site: the former site of the Pacific International Livestock Exposition, which, in 1942, had been the site of the Portland Assembly Center.

More recently, on February 19, 2022, a Day of Remembrance mini exhibit opened in the Japanese American Museum of Oregon. This mini exhibit helps educate the public to help honor and remember those impacted by the incarceration of Japanese Americans. In addition to this mini exhibit, The Portland Japanese Citizens Americans League is known to hold Day of Remembrance events. The most recent even was held was on February 17, 2024, and was open for public attendance again working to educate the public and empower individuals to stand up for Asian Americans.

=== California ===
In 1986 Governor George Deukmejian declared February 19, 1986, to be a Day of Remembrance in California, the first DOR designation by the state of California., two and a half years before the "redress bill" (Civil Liberties Act of 1988) was signed on August 10, 1988.

In 2013, a ceremony was to be held in San Francisco's Japantown district. Los Angeles County has officially recognized the day.

More recently, in 2023, the Day of Remembrance was celebrated at the Japanese American National Museum in Los Angeles. The event included talks from guest speakers, music performances, and art. This specific event embodied the theme of uniting voices to show that the strength of a democracy comes from the people within it. This remembrance also included calls to action.

=== Colorado ===
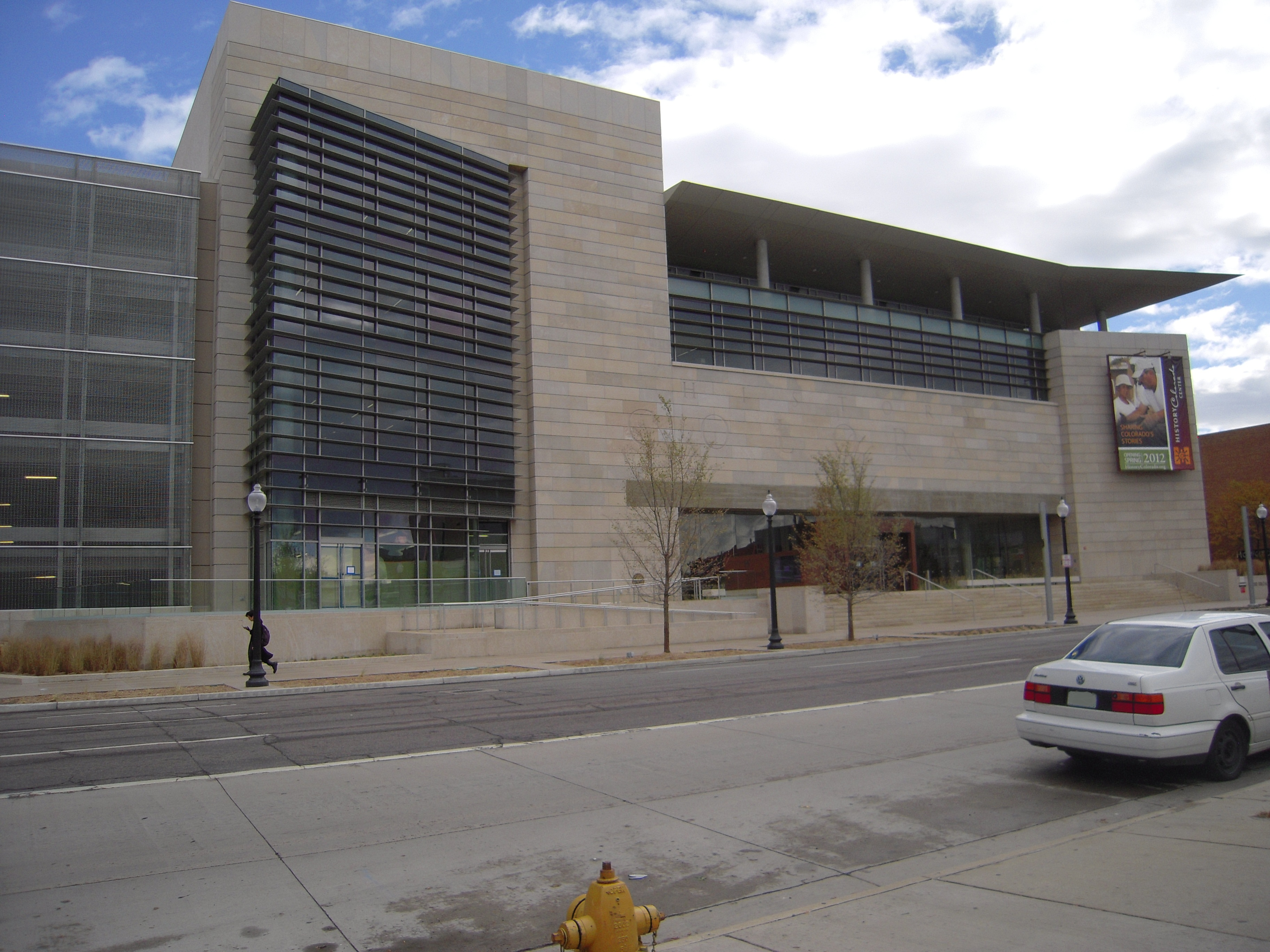
History Colorado Center

In Colorado, the earliest recorded Day of Remembrance event was held February 17, 2013, at the History Colorado Center in Denver, Colorado. The event was hosted by the Mile High Chapter of the Japanese American Citizens League (JACL) and consisted of 5 Japanese American speakers Carolyn Takeshita, Rose Tanaka, Bob Fuchigami, Aiko Okubo and Min Mochizoki. Each of these speakers shared their stories of Japanese internment and the events that occurred the day they were forced out of their homes and what life was like after. In each of their cases, these events happened when they were only children. The event lasted a day and gathered a crowd of over 200 people.

Camp Amache located in Granada, Colorado is one of the centers built as internment camp for Japanese americans. In present day, Camp Amache is now known as Granada Relocation Center. In March 2022, President Joe Biden signed the Amache National Historic Site Act. This allowed for Amache National Historic Site to officially be a national park. The park currently serves a resource center to help educate the public. This National Park is anticipated to hold Day of Remembrance celebrations and be a critical site of knowledge and remembrance in Colorado.

=== Arizona ===
Recorded Day of Remembrance events in Arizona date back to 2017 and 2021. The event in 2017 was facilitated by the Southern Arizona Japanese Cultural Coalition. During the event in 2017 the Southern Arizona Japanese Cultural Coalition held a discussion with a broad coalition of people who have familial ties to Japanese internment. They included faculty members, photographers, and former government employees, some of whom had direct familial ties to Japanese internment. There was a panel discussion held by the Asian Pacific American Student Affairs located at The University of Arizona in 2021. It included an analysis on Japanese Americans and their mobilization to combat the injustices of Executive Order 9066.

=== Alaska ===
In Alaska, the earliest recorded Day of Remembrance event was held on February 19, 2016. It was hosted at the Joint-Base Elmendorf Richardson with an attendance of a few dozen people and was a first of its kind event held at the Joint-Base Elmendorf Richardson. The event was a single day event consisting of speaker Alice Tanaka Hikido who as a child, lived through the events of relocation and Japanese internment when she was only 9 years old. The place this event took place in was unique due to the fact the building is resting on a not commonly known internment camp. Knowing this information, it was also noted that in Hikido's presentation references to the prison like containment of the camps were made known.

=== Utah ===
In Utah, the earliest recorded Day of Remembrance event was held February 19, 2005. The event was held in Salt Lake City's Japantown at the Japanese Church of Christ by the Japanese-American community. The event was held to remember the role the war had on the Japantown and community. The event consisted of speakers such as U.S. Representative Mike Honda who recognized February 19 as a day to educate people on the injustices of World War II, University of Utah Professor Haruko Moriyasu as well as the presentation of the 30 minute film Toyo Miyatake: Infinite Shades of Gray, A film based on Toyo Miyatake's secret photography at the Manzanar internment camp.

=== Idaho ===
The state of Idaho has been commemorating day of remembrance since the early 2000s. The governor's office often facilitates these events. In recent years the event in Idaho has included films. both involved dialogue about the grave concern of civil rights violations faced by people of Japanese descent but the more broad impact and repercussions of actions that lead to such events. in 2023 the state screened the film the Power of Words. In 2024 Idaho screened a film titled Omoiyari created by artist Kishi Bashi. Kishi Bashi recounted his own experience of being impacted by the legacy of Japanese internment and how others were impacted as well.

== Other observances ==
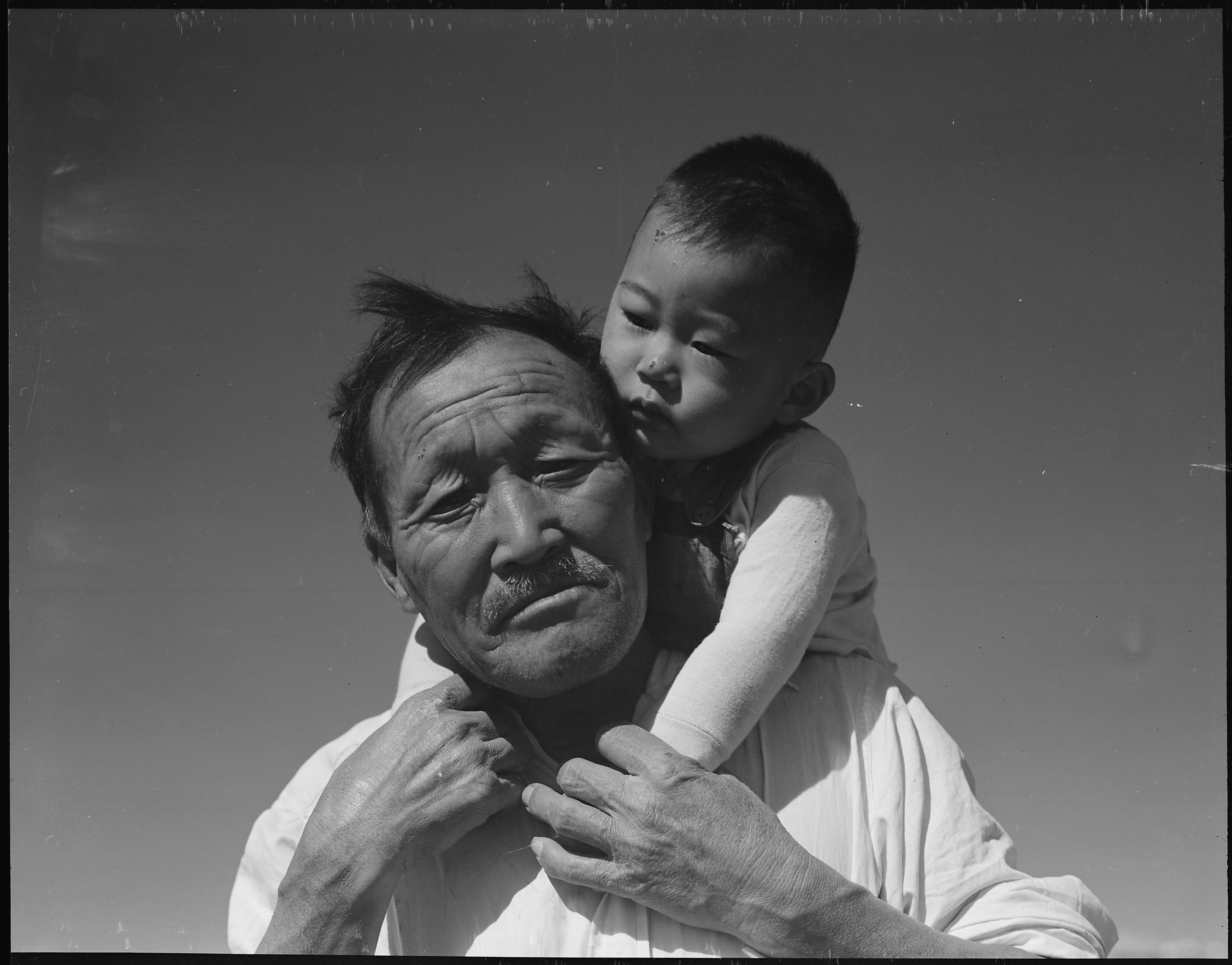
A photo of a grandfather and grandson at Manzanar Relocation Center, part of the photos that were impounded during the war

=== Art installations and photo exhibits ===
==== Utah ====
February 11, 2019, the University of Utah's American West Center sponsored and exhibit commemorating Japanese internment. It featured photographs taken by Dorothea Lange and Ansel Adams that captured the experience of those who were forced to be relocated to internment camps.

==== Juneau, Alaska ====
February 14, 2014, the Juneau-Douglas City Museum displayed "The Empty Chair: The Forced Removal and Relocation of Juneau's Japanese, 1941-1951". The Empty Chair is a bronze folding chair sculpted by Peter Reiquam, designed to give the visitor an idea of what the sculpture is memorializing. The sculpture is placed on simulated floor boards that are similar to the gymnasium floor the graduation ceremony for the Juneau High School class of 1958.

== See also ==
- Bainbridge Island Japanese American Exclusion Memorial
- Densho: The Japanese American Legacy Project
- Empty Chair Memorial
- Fred Korematsu Day
- Go for Broke Monument
- Harada House
- Japanese American Memorial to Patriotism During World War II
- National Japanese American Veterans Memorial Court
- Sakura Square
- Japanese American redress and court cases
- Japanese American service in World War II
