= Densho: The Japanese American Legacy Project =

American nonprofit organization

Coordinates: 47.599312°N 122.313388°W

- Founded: 1996; 30 years ago
- Type: Nonprofit organization
- Headquarters: Seattle, Washington, United States
- Website: densho.org

Japanese Americans in World War II, a National Historic Landmark theme study

Densho is a nonprofit organization based in Seattle, Washington whose mission is “to preserve and share history of the WWII incarceration of Japanese Americans to promote equity and justice today.” Densho collects video oral histories, photos, documents, and other primary source materials regarding Japanese American history, with a focus on the World War II period and the incarceration of Japanese Americans. Densho offers a free digital archive of these primary sources. It also maintains an online encyclopedia of notable Japanese Americans and related topics and an educational curricula.

== History ==
The Japanese word denshō (伝承) means "to pass on to future generations." The organization was founded in 1996 with a primary goal of collecting personal testimonies from Japanese Americans who were incarcerated during World War II. Over the years, its work expanded to "educate, preserve, collaborate, and inspire action for equity." Densho uses digital technology and best archival practices to collect, record, preserve, and share its oral histories, documents, photographs, newspapers, and other primary source materials documenting the wartime detention of over 120,000 people of Japanese descent without due process of law.

Densho's founding director Tom Ikeda announced his retirement in 2022. He was succeeded by Naomi Kawamura.

== Organizational structure ==
Densho is a 501(c) 3 organization, with tax-exempt status, founded in Seattle in 1996 as a project of the Japanese American Chamber of Commerce of Washington State. It became an independent organization in 2002. Densho has a Board of Trustees with nine members and a staff of 17, led by Executive Director Naomi Ostwald Kawamura. Program activities are supported by volunteers and graduate student interns. Financial support is provided by foundation and government grants, the annual Densho fundraising event, and individual donations.

== Awards ==
Densho received the first NPower Innovation Award for groundbreaking use of technology; the Association of King County Historical Organizations Long Term Project Award; an American Library Association citation for online history; the Washington State Historical Society David Douglas Award; the Stetson Kennedy Vox Populis Award of the Oral History Association; the Society of American Archivists Hamer-Kegan Award; and the City of Seattle Mayor’s Arts Award for Cultural Preservation. The Executive Director, Tom Ikeda, has received a Humanities Washington Award for outstanding contributions to the humanities; the Japanese American Citizens League Biennium Award; the Japanese American National Museum Founders’ Award; the Association of King County Historical Organizations’ Charles Payton Award for Cultural Advocacy; and the Washington State Historical Society’s Robert Gray Medal; among other honors.

== Activities ==
Densho's online archive contains nearly two thousand hours of indexed and transcribed video interviews and eighty thousand historic photos and documents. The website also includes free social studies curricula meeting Washington-State standards. Over nine hundred video interviews detail individuals' experiences at the ten War Relocation Authority (WRA) camps as well as the Justice Department and War Department detention facilities. In addition, Japanese Americans who were not detained, white employees in the camps, and non-Japanese Americans who witnessed the forced removal during World War II or supported the redress movement of the 1980s tell their stories to Densho. Prominent people such as Aiko Herzig-Yoshinaga, Norman Mineta, Daniel Inouye, Dale Minami, and Yuri Kochiyama are included in the collection, but the organization's goal is to capture life stories of diverse Japanese Americans from all walks of life. Densho continues to interview survivors of the camps and others who can describe how the forced removal and detention affected people's lives. The broader goal of the organization is to inform the American public about the false basis for the mass incarceration, so that later injustices would never again affect another minority group in the future.

Densho presents public education programs such as author talks, and has collaborated with cultural and civic organizations such as the Wing Luke Museum of the Asian Pacific American Experience, the Museum of History and Industry, the Washington State Holocaust Education Resource Center, the Birmingham Civil Rights Institute, the American Civil Liberties Union of Washington, and the Washington chapter of the Council on American-Islamic Relations. Densho assists oral history generation and preservation by other ethnic heritage and cultural organizations, such as the Bainbridge Island Japanese American Community and the Japanese American National Museum in Los Angeles. These efforts expand and enrich Densho’s mission by drawing connections with the Japanese American experience and other little-recorded and seldom discussed stories of discrimination, racism, and stereotyping faced by many ethnic communities, both in the past and today.

Densho offers curriculum units investigating civil liberties issues. For example, the lesson "Causes of Conflict" guides students through a study of the issues of immigration via the essential question: "How do conflicts over immigration arise from labor needs and social change?" In the unit "Dig Deep", they explore the media and the incarceration of Japanese Americans during World War II by asking the question, "How do members of a democracy become fully informed so that they can participate responsibly and effectively?" In the unit "Constitutional Issues: Civil Liberties, Individuals, and the Common Good", students find answers to the question, "How can the United States balance the rights of individuals with the common good?" Densho's education efforts encourage students' critical thinking and respect for everyone's civil liberties.

=== Densho Encyclopedia ===
The Densho Encyclopedia is a free, publicly accessible resource that covers many key concepts, people, events, and organizations relevant to the WWII incarceration of Japanese Americans. The encyclopedia also covers the history of Japanese immigration to the United States, legal and social discrimination prior to WWII, and Japanese American efforts to obtain redress and reparations in the decades after incarceration. Brian Niiya, director of content at Densho, is editor. Articles are peer-reviewed and contributed by professional scholars, graduate students, journalists, and individuals who Densho describes as having “played a role in telling the Japanese American story or who have been active players in that story.”

The Densho Encyclopedia initially went online in 2012 with about 360 articles and currently has an article count of nearly 1,500, along with photos, documents, and oral history clips drawn from Densho’s archives and other sources. The Densho Resource Guide to Media on the Japanese American Removal and Incarceration went online in 2017. Funding has come from the California State Library's California Civil Liberties Public Education Fund and the National Park Service. The content, including most 3rd part materials, is provided under a Creative Commons Attribution-NonCommercial-ShareAlike 3.0 Unported License (CC BY-NC-SA 3.0).

== See also ==
- Bainbridge Island Japanese American Exclusion Memorial
- Empty Chair Memorial
- Day of Remembrance (Japanese Americans)
- Fred Korematsu Day
- Go for Broke Monument
- Harada House
- Japanese American Memorial to Patriotism During World War II
- National Japanese American Veterans Memorial Court
- Sakura Square
- U.S.-Japan Council
