= William Hohri =

American political activist

William Minoru Hohri (March 13, 1927 – November 12, 2010) was an American political activist and the lead plaintiff in the National Council for Japanese American Redress lawsuit seeking monetary reparations for the internment of Japanese Americans during World War II. He was sent to the Manzanar concentration camp with his family after the attack on Pearl Harbor triggered the United States' entry into the war. After leading the NCJAR's class action suit against the federal government, which was dismissed, Hohri's advocacy helped convince Congress to pass legislation that provided compensation to each surviving internee. The legislation, signed by President Ronald Reagan in 1988, included an apology to those sent to the camps.

Hohri was born on March 13, 1927, in San Francisco, the sixth and youngest child of Daisuke and Asa Hohri, Protestant missionaries who had immigrated to the United States in 1922. At age 3, both of his parents were stricken with tuberculosis and he was sent to the Shonien orphanage, where he spent the next three years while his parents were treated at a sanitarium; when he was returned to his family Hohri was fluent only in English, a language that his parents were unable to speak. When Pearl Harbor was attacked on December 7, 1941, Hohri was a student at North Hollywood High School. His father was arrested by the FBI hours after the attack and sent to the Department of Justice camp at Fort Missoula, Montana. Under the terms of Executive Order 9066, issued by President Franklin D. Roosevelt in February 1942 and later upheld by the Supreme Court of the United States, Hohri was sent to Manzanar, a War Relocation Authority camp in the remote Owens Valley area of California, together with the rest of his family. More than 112,000 other Japanese Americans who had been swept up in the wave of anti-Japanese sentiment that was whipped up by the Japanese attack on the U.S. were sent to ten concentration camps. His father was eventually "released" from the DOJ detention center and reunited with the rest of the family in Manzanar. Hohri completed high school in camp and was granted leave to attend college in 1944, earning his undergraduate degree from the University of Chicago. In March 1945, he returned to Manzanar to visit his parents and, despite an earlier presidential order declaring Japanese Americans free to return to the West Coast, was jailed for traveling in California without a permit and ordered to leave the state at gunpoint. Hohri married Yuriko Katayama in 1951 and the couple settled in Chicago, where Hohri worked as a computer programmer.

Hohri's activism began in civil rights marches and anti-war demonstrations during the 1960s and 1970s, and in 1977 he helped obtain a pardon for Iva Toguri D'Aquino, the falsely accused "Tokyo Rose." Calling the U.S. government's actions "consistent with the general pattern of discrimination already established" on a de facto basis before the war, Hohri became active in efforts to obtain compensation for those who had been interned and an official apology for the policy. As head of the National Council for Japanese American Redress, Hohri was the lead plaintiff in a lawsuit that sought $27 billion in damages for the class of individuals held in the internment camps, but the case was ultimately unsuccessful. In the wake of Hohri's efforts, the United States Congress passed the Civil Liberties Act of 1988, under which an apology was offered and each surviving internee received $20,000 in compensation; Hohri used his check to buy a Japanese-made car. The American Book Awards recognized him in 1989 for his book Repairing America: An Account of the Movement for Japanese American Redress.

A resident of Los Angeles, Hohri died at the age of 83 on November 12, 2010, due to complications of Alzheimer's disease at his home there in Pacific Palisades.
