= Japanese American Memorial to Patriotism During World War II =

U.S. national memorial in Washington, D.C.

- 全米日系米国人記念碑 (Japanese)
- Location within Central Washington, D.C. Location within the District of Columbia Location within the United States
- Artist: Nina Akamu
- Year: 2000
- Type: Bronze
- Dimensions: 4.3 m (14 ft)
- Location: Washington, D.C., United States; 38°53′40.28″N 77°0′37.76″W

The Japanese American Memorial to Patriotism During World War II (Japanese: 全米日系米国人記念碑, Zenbei Nikkei Beikokujin Kinenhi) is a National Park Service site to commemorate the contributions of American citizens of Japanese ancestry and their parents who patriotically supported the United States despite unjust treatment during World War II.

The work is at Louisiana Avenue and D Street in Washington, D.C. The memorial commemorates Japanese American war involvement, veterans, and patriotism during World War II, as well as the patriotism and endurance of those held in Japanese American internment, or, incarceration camps, and detention centers.

== Description ==
The central cast bronze sculpture, named "Golden Cranes", consists of two Japanese cranes caught in barbed wire on top of a tall, square pedestal incised with grooves suggestive of drill cores used to extract stone from quarries. Standing in a landscaped plaza, a semi-circular granite wall curves around the sculpture. The wall features inscriptions of the names of the ten major internment camps where over 120,000 Japanese Americans were confined. Of the nearly 160,000 citizens of Japanese descent living in Hawaii, fewer than 2,000 were confined. There are also three panels that feature 1) the names of Japanese Americans who died fighting in World War II, 2) inscribed writings by Japanese American writers such as Bill Hosokawa, 3) quotes by presidents Harry S. Truman and Ronald Reagan.

== Acquisition and creation ==
The concept for the monument was initiated in 1988 by the "Go For Broke" National Veterans Association Foundation. The name of this organization was later changed to the National Japanese American Memorial Foundation (NJAMF). Architect Davis Buckley and sculptor Nina Akamu were the principal designers.

Construction of the National Japanese American Memorial on federal land was authorized by statute (PL 102-502) and signed into law by President George Bush on October 24, 1992, to "Commemorate the experience of American citizens of Japanese ancestry and their parents who patriotically supported this country despite their unjust treatment during World War II." The memorial groundbreaking took place on October 22, 1999, and the memorial was dedicated on November 9, 2000. A celebration of the completion of the memorial was held on June 29, 2001.

Preceding the final design and installation of the memorial, sculptor Nina Akamu traveled to the International Crane Foundation in Baraboo, Wisconsin, where she spent time studying and sketching the cranes that would become the centerpiece of the memorial.

Ownership of the memorial was officially transferred to the United States Government in 2002. The National Park Service is responsible for the maintenance of the national memorial.

== Symbolism ==
Rising above the rest of the memorial, the cranes are visible from beyond the Memorial walls, which celebrates the ability to rise beyond limitations. Their postures reflect one another – one wing pointing upwards, the other downwards, mirroring each other and representing the duality of the universe. Pressing their bodies against one another and seeming to hold onto the barbed wire, the birds show individual effort to escape restraint with the need for communal support and interdependence on one another. There is an "Honor Wall" central within the memorial which lists the names of the 800-plus Japanese Americans in the U.S. Armed Forces who died in service during World War II.

According to the National Japanese American Memorial Foundation, the memorial:

...is symbolic not only of the Japanese American experience, but of the extrication of anyone from deeply painful and restrictive circumstances. It reminds us of the battles we've fought to overcome our ignorance and prejudice and the meaning of an integrated culture, once pained and torn, now healed and unified. Finally, the monument presents the Japanese American experience as a symbol for all peoples.

== Veterans honored ==
The memorial honors Japanese American veterans who served in the 100th Infantry Battalion, 442nd RCT, Military Intelligence Service and other units. The 100th/442nd Regimental Combat Team would become the most decorated unit of the war for its size and length of service.

The 100th Infantry Battalion and the 442nd together earned seven Presidential Unit Citations, two Meritorious Service Plaques, 36 Army Commendation Medals, and 87 Division Commendations. Individually, Soldiers earned 21 Medals of Honor, 29 Distinguished Service Crosses, one Distinguished Service Medal, more than 354 Silver Stars, and more than 4,000 Purple Hearts, as noted by Chief of Staff of the Army General Raymond T. Odierno during a November 2, 2011, ceremony in Washington, D.C. at which 40 Japanese Americans were presented the Bronze Stars they had never received. A year prior to this ceremony, President Barack Obama signed legislation on October 5, 2010, to grant the Congressional Gold Medal, collectively, to the 100th Infantry Battalion and 442nd Regimental Combat Team in recognition of their dedicated service during World War II.

== Dedication on November 9, 2000 ==
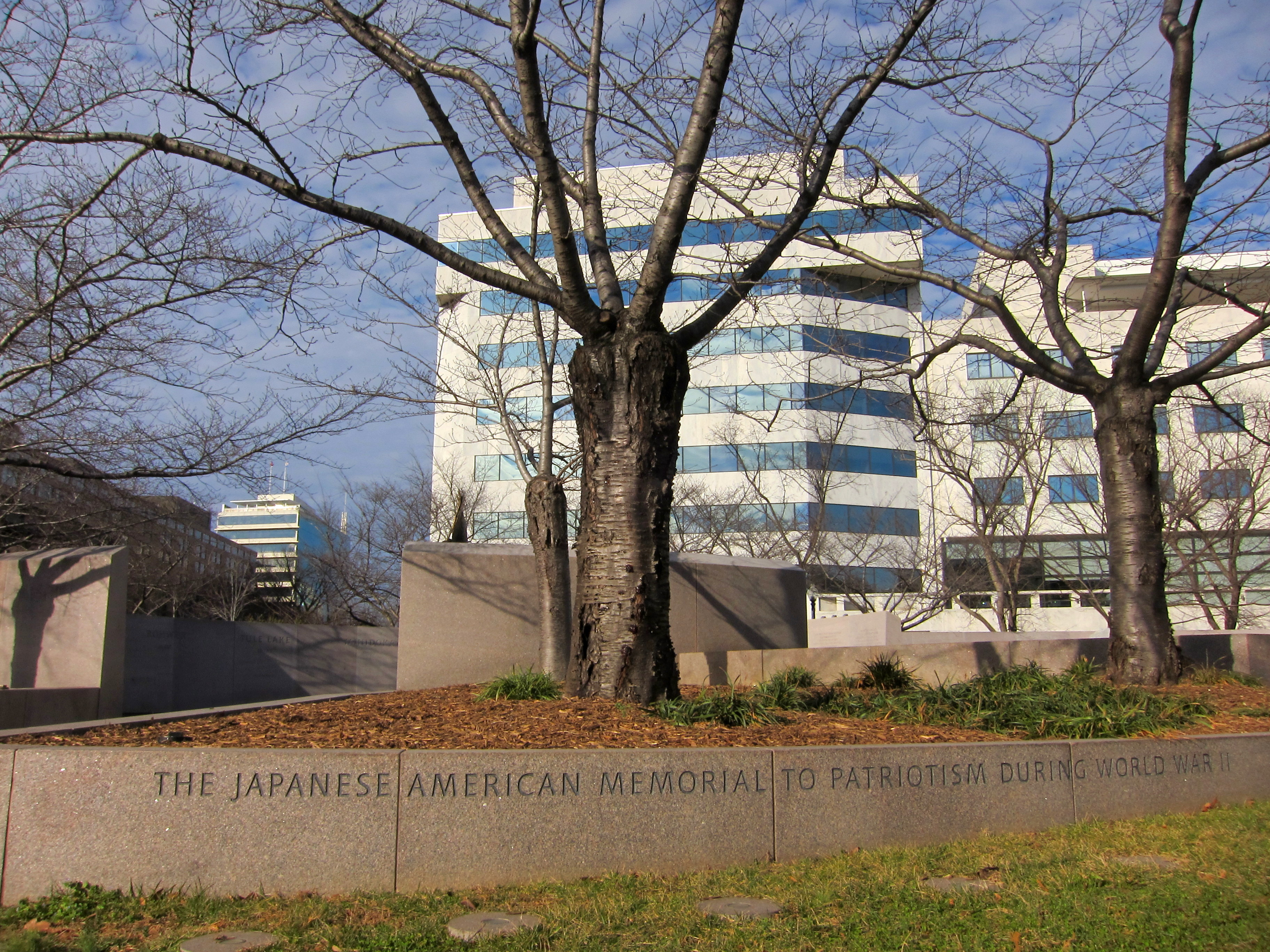
Front sign of the memorial

The U.S.Department of Defense described the November 9, 2000, dedication of the memorial: "Drizzling rain was mixed with tears streaming down the faces of Japanese American World War II heroes and those who spent the war years imprisoned in isolated internment camps..."

The Department of Defense Armed Force Press Service reported on November 15 that an estimated 2,000 people attended the dedication "to commemorate the heroism and sacrifice of Japanese Americans who fought and died for the United States...They also came to honor the more than 120,000 men, women and children who maintained their loyalty even though they were put in desolate internment camps."

Deputy Secretary of Defense Rudy de Leon spoke at the dedication, noting, "one of the great ironies of World War II was that Japanese Americans of the 522nd Field Artillery Battalion were among the first allied troops to liberate several sub-camps of the Dachau concentration camp complex. They liberated prisoners of war while some of them had family members kept in internment camps back in the United States"

United States Attorney General Janet Reno also spoke at the dedication of the memorial, where she shared a letter from President Bill Clinton stating:

We are diminished when any American is targeted unfairly because of his or her heritage. This memorial and the internment sites are powerful reminders that stereotyping, discrimination, hatred and racism have no place in this country.

== "Golden Cranes" sculptor, Nina Akamu ==
Nina Akamu is a third-generation Japanese American artist and former vice president of the National Sculpture Society. Akamu created the sculpture entitled "Golden Cranes" of two Grus japonensis birds, which became the center feature of the Japanese American Memorial to Patriotism During World War II.

Akamu's grandfather on her mother's side was arrested in Hawaii during the internment program. He was sent to a relocation camp on Sand Island in Pearl Harbor. Suffering from diabetes upon his internment, he died of a heart attack three months into his imprisonment. This family connection — combined with growing up for a time in Hawaii, where she fished with her father at Pearl Harbor — and the erection of a Japanese American war memorial near her home in Massa, Italy, inspired a strong connection to the memorial and its creation.

== Memorial inscription ==
The following is inscribed on the memorial:

Japanese American Memorial to Patriotism During World War II

On February 19, 1942, 73 days after the United States entered World War II, President Franklin D. Roosevelt issued Executive Order 9066 which resulted in the removal of 120,000 Japanese American men, women and children from their homes in the western states and Hawaii.

Allowed only what they could carry, families were forced to abandon homes, friends, farms and businesses to live in ten remote relocation centers guarded by armed troops and surrounded by barbed wire fences. Some remained in the relocation centers until March 1946.

In addition 4,500 were arrested by the Justice Department and held in internment camps, such as Santa Fe, New Mexico. 2,500 were also held at the family camp in Crystal City, Texas.

Answering the call of duty, young Japanese Americans entered into military service, joining many pre-war draftees. The 100th infantry battalion and 442nd regimental combat team, fighting in Europe, became the most highly decorated army unit for its size and length of service in American Military History. Japanese Americans in the Military Intelligence Service used their bilingual skills to help shorten the war in the Pacific and thus saved countless American lives. The 1399th Engineer Construction Battalion helped fortify the infrastructure essential for victory.

In 1983, almost forty years after the war ended, the federal Commission on Wartime Relocation and Internment of Civilians found that there had been no military necessity for the mass imprisonment of Japanese Americans and that a grave injustice had been done.

In 1988 President Ronald W. Reagan signed the Civil Liberties Act which made an apology for the injustice, provided minimal compensation and reaffirmed the nation's commitment to equal justice under the law for all Americans.

The following additional quotes are inscribed on the memorial:

May this memorial be a tribute to the indomitable spirit of a citizenry in World War II who remained steadfast in their faith in our democratic system.

Norman Y. Mineta, internee at Heart Mountain, Wyoming.

I am proud that I am an American
of Japanese ancestry.
I believe in this nation's
institutions, ideals and traditions.
I glory in her heritage.
I boast of her history.
I trust in her future.

Mike M. Masaoka, civil rights advocate, staff sergeant, 442nd Regimental Combat Team.

Our actions in passing the Civil Liberties Act of 1988 are essential for giving credibility to our constitutional system and reinforcing our tradition of justice.

Robert T Matsui, internee at Tule Lake.

The lessons learned must remain as a grave reminder of what we must not allow to happen again to any group.

Daniel K. Inouye, US Congressman, US Senator and Captain of 442nd Regional Combat Team.

You fought not only the enemy but you fought prejudice – and you won. Keep up that fight and we will continue to win to make this great republic stand for what the constitution says its stands for the welfare of all of the people all of the time.

President Harry S. Truman, July 15, 1946 ("Remarks Upon Presenting a Citation to a Nisei Regiment", Harry S. Truman Library & Museum during which President Truman made the presentation in a ceremony on the Ellipse south of the White House grounds).

{{center
|Japanese by Blood
Hearts and Minds American
With Honor Unbowed
Bore the String of Injustice
For Future Generations
}}

Tanka poem, a classical form of Japanese poetry, written by Akemi Dawn Matsumoto Ehrlich, titled "The Legacy":

The names of the ten major internment, or incarceration, camps and the number of Japanese Americans confined in each camp also are engraved in stone on the memorial:

Internment	Interns	State
Poston	17,814	Arizona
Heart Mountain	10,767	Wyoming
Topaz	8,130	Utah
Jerome	8,497	Arkansas
Manzanar	10,046	California
Rohwer	8,475	Arkansas
Tule Lake	18,879	California
Minidoka	9,397	Idaho
Gila River	13,348	Arizona
Amache	7,318	Colorado

== See also ==
- Bainbridge Island Japanese American Exclusion Memorial
- Day of Remembrance (Japanese Americans)
- Densho: The Japanese American Legacy Project
- Empty Chair Memorial
- Fred Korematsu Day
- Go for Broke Monument
- Harada House
- National Japanese American Veterans Memorial Court
- Sakura Square
- Japanese American redress and court cases
- Japanese American service in World War II
- List of documentary films about the Japanese American internment
- List of feature films about the Japanese American internment
- List of national memorials of the United States
- List of public art in Washington, D.C., Ward 6
- Topaz (1945 film)
