= Sakura Square =

Plaza in Denver, Colorado

Coordinates: 39.7519°N 104.9934°W

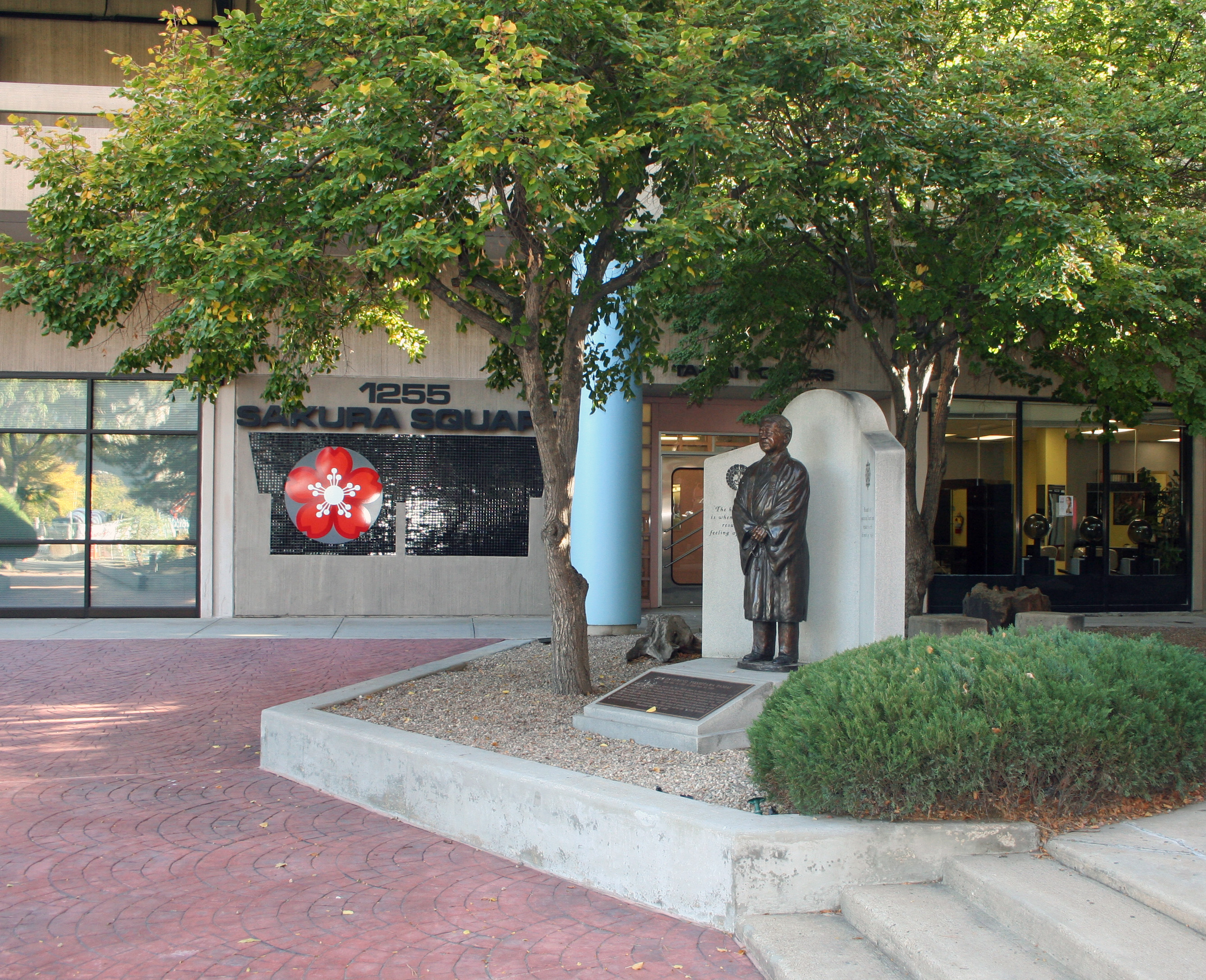
Sakura Square, Denver, Colorado

Sakura Square (Japanese: サクラ・スクエア, Sakura Sukuea) is a small plaza located on the north/east side of the intersection of 19th Street and Larimer Street in Denver, Colorado. The square contains busts of Ralph L. Carr, Governor of Colorado from 1939 to 1943, Minoru Yasui, a Japanese-American lawyer, and Yoshitaka Tamai (1900–1983), a Buddhist priest who lived in Denver. Sakura Square also has a small Japanese garden, and it serves as the entrance to the 20-story Tamai Tower apartment building that occupies most of the block. There are several shops and restaurants in the ground and first floors of the apartment building.

== Bust of Governor Carr ==
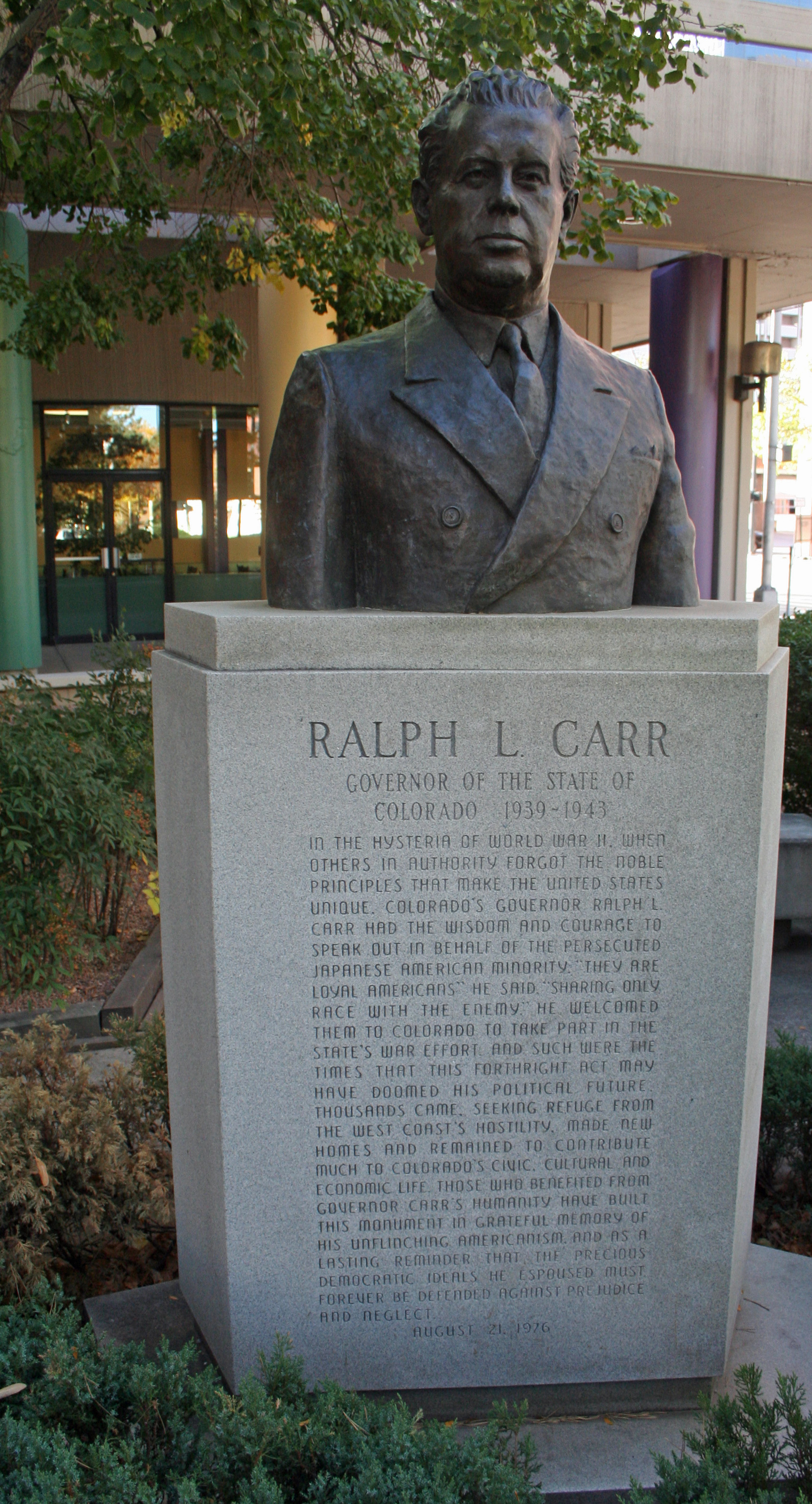
Bust of Ralph L. Carr in Sakura Square

Denver's Japanese-American community installed the bust of former Colorado Governor Ralph Lawrence Carr as a tribute to his support of Japanese Americans during the period of their internment. At the time, Governor Carr was the only elected official in the United States to publicly apologize to the Japanese Americans for their internment.

== Cherry Blossom Festival ==
The annual Denver Cherry Blossom Festival takes place in late June in and around Sakura Square and the Tri-State/Denver Buddhist Temple. Since it was first held in 1973, the festival celebrates the Japanese heritage and culture through live entertainment, food and drink, vendor marketplace, and informative exhibits and demonstrations. During the celebration, many traditional Japanese practices are celebrated, such as Min'yō dances, martial arts demonstrations, and ikebana (flower arrangement). The Japanese-themed marketplace brings vendors from across Colorado and the United States selling jewelry, anime-themed merchandise, pottery, fine art, apparel and more. Delicious traditional foods and snacks can be found throughout the weekend festival. The Denver Cherry Blossom Festival is the largest fundraiser for the operations and programs of both the Tri-State/Denver Buddhist Temple and Sakura Foundation.

== See also ==
- Japantown
- Sakura Park
- Bainbridge Island Japanese American Exclusion Memorial
- Day of Remembrance (Japanese Americans)
- Densho: The Japanese American Legacy Project
- Empty Chair Memorial
- Fred Korematsu Day
- Go for Broke Monument
- Harada House
- Japanese American Memorial to Patriotism During World War II
- National Japanese American Veterans Memorial Court
