= The Long Journey Home (ceremonial event) =

Japanese American graduating class of 2008

The Long Journey Home was a ceremonial event held at the main campus of the University of Washington on May 18, 2008, commemorating the Japanese American students who, due to the passage of Executive Order 9066 in 1942, were forced to leave the school and live in internment camps in the western United States. For nearly seventy years, many Japanese Americans were unable to return to the university to complete their education. Some attended at other universities, while others were forced to end their college career early because of financial reasons. In order to recognize the Japanese American students affected by the government's decision, the University of Washington carried out a ceremony "to honor the students and to educate current and future generations about the grievous national tragedy" by incorporating guest speakers and video memoirs while the students honored at the day's ceremony were given honorary degrees from the University of Washington.

== Description ==
The Long Journey Home was held at the main campus of the University of Washington inside rooms 120 and 130 of Kane Hall. The ceremony was held on May 18, 2008, and was scheduled to last from 1:00 pm – 3:30 pm Pacific Standard Time.

== Agenda ==
Although the ceremony did not officially begin until 2:00 pm, group photographs were taken of the honorees in front of the campus' Suzzallo Library at approximately 1:00 pm. The recognition ceremony began at 2:00 pm in Kane Hall, beginning with the entrance of the university regents. The president of the University of Washington, Mark Emmert, presided over the event and gave a speech on the significance of this event as well as his personal perspective of the internment. Emmert was followed by several other speakers, which included Norman Mineta, Gail Nomura, and Tetsuden Kashima. A video memoir was shown prior to the "presentation of the honorary degrees" which included personal accounts of University of Washington students of the internment and its effect on their time at the university, as well as their personal opinions of "The Long Journey Home" regarding its closure to the "long journey" which the Japanese endured.

== See also ==
- Empty Chair Memorial
- University of Washington
- History of the Japanese in Seattle
- Japanese American internment
- Lee Paul Sieg
