= Bainbridge Island Japanese American Exclusion Memorial =

Coordinates: 47.615298°N 122.510194°W

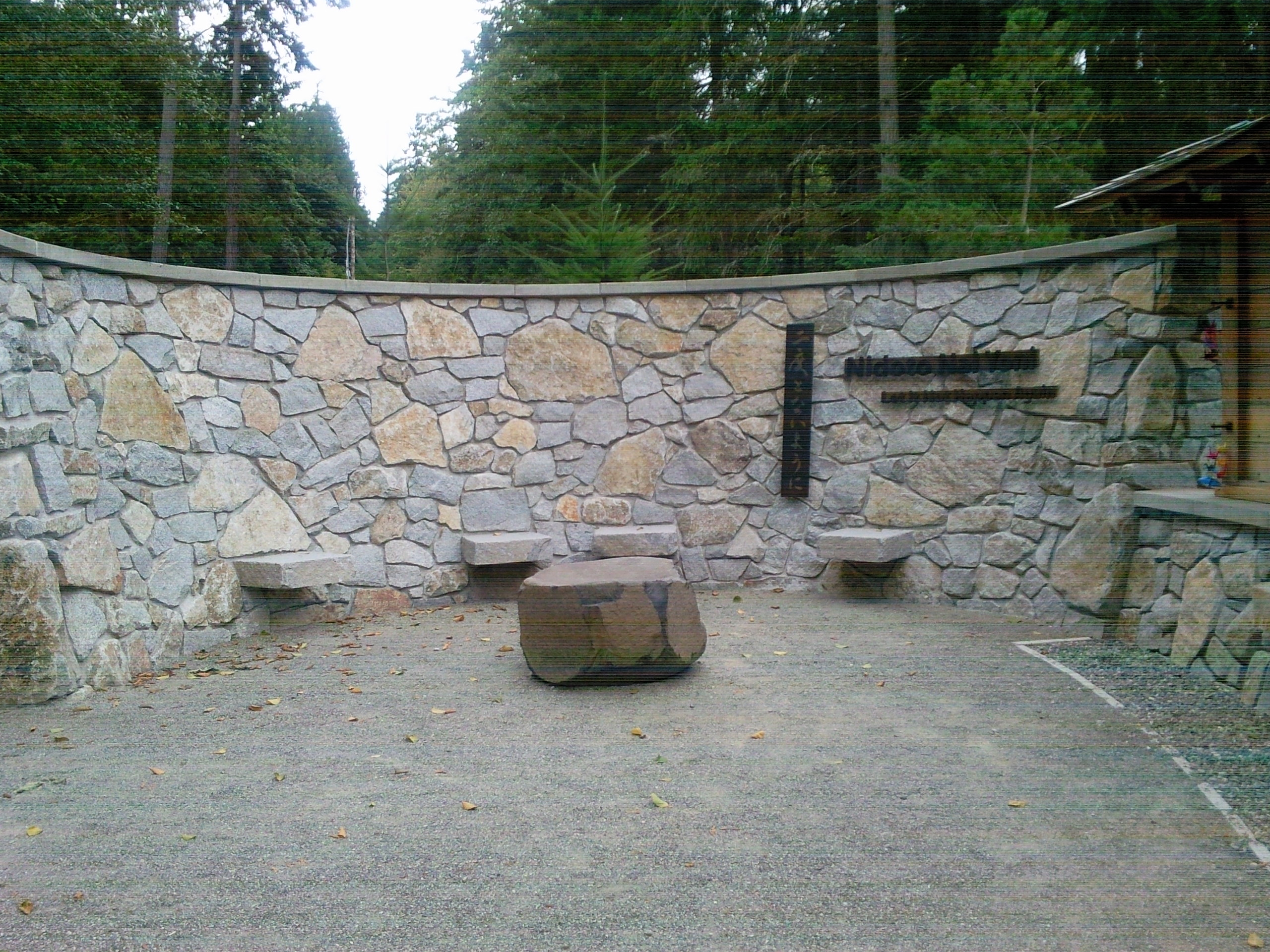
Stone wall at memorial entrance

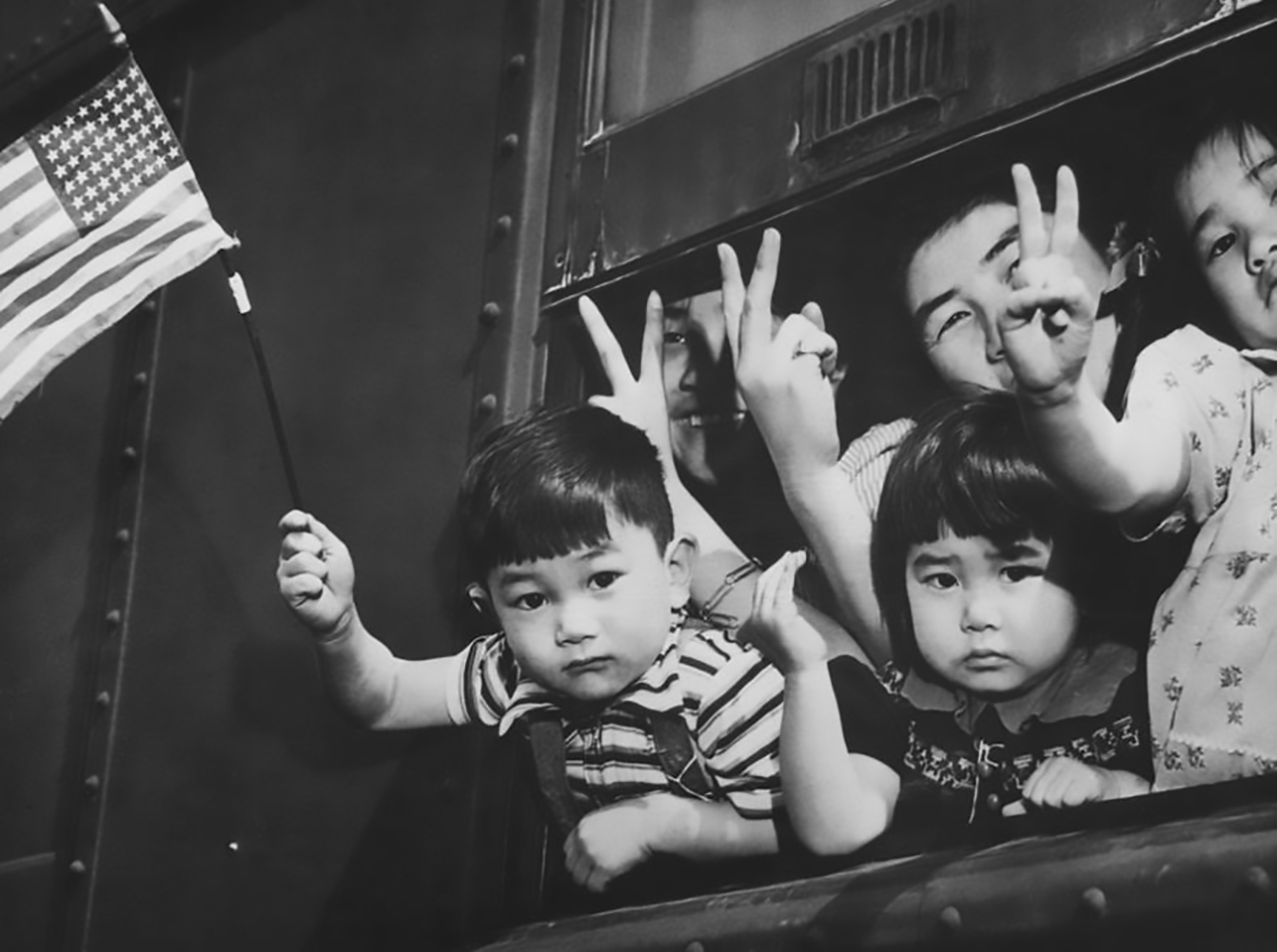
Bainbridge Island, Washington evacuation. Children evacuees wave from special train as it leaves Seattle to an internment camp, March 30, 1942

The Bainbridge Island Japanese American Exclusion Memorial (Japanese: ベインブリッジ島日系アメリカ人排除記念碑, Beinburijjitō Nikkei Amerikajin Haijo Kinenhi) is an outdoor exhibit commemorating the internment of Japanese Americans from Bainbridge Island, Washington. It is located on the south shore of Eagle Harbor, opposite the town of Winslow. Administratively, it is a unit of the Minidoka National Historic Site in Idaho. The mission of the memorial is Nidoto Nai Yoni (Japanese: 二度とないように), which means “Let It Not Happen Again”.

== Background ==
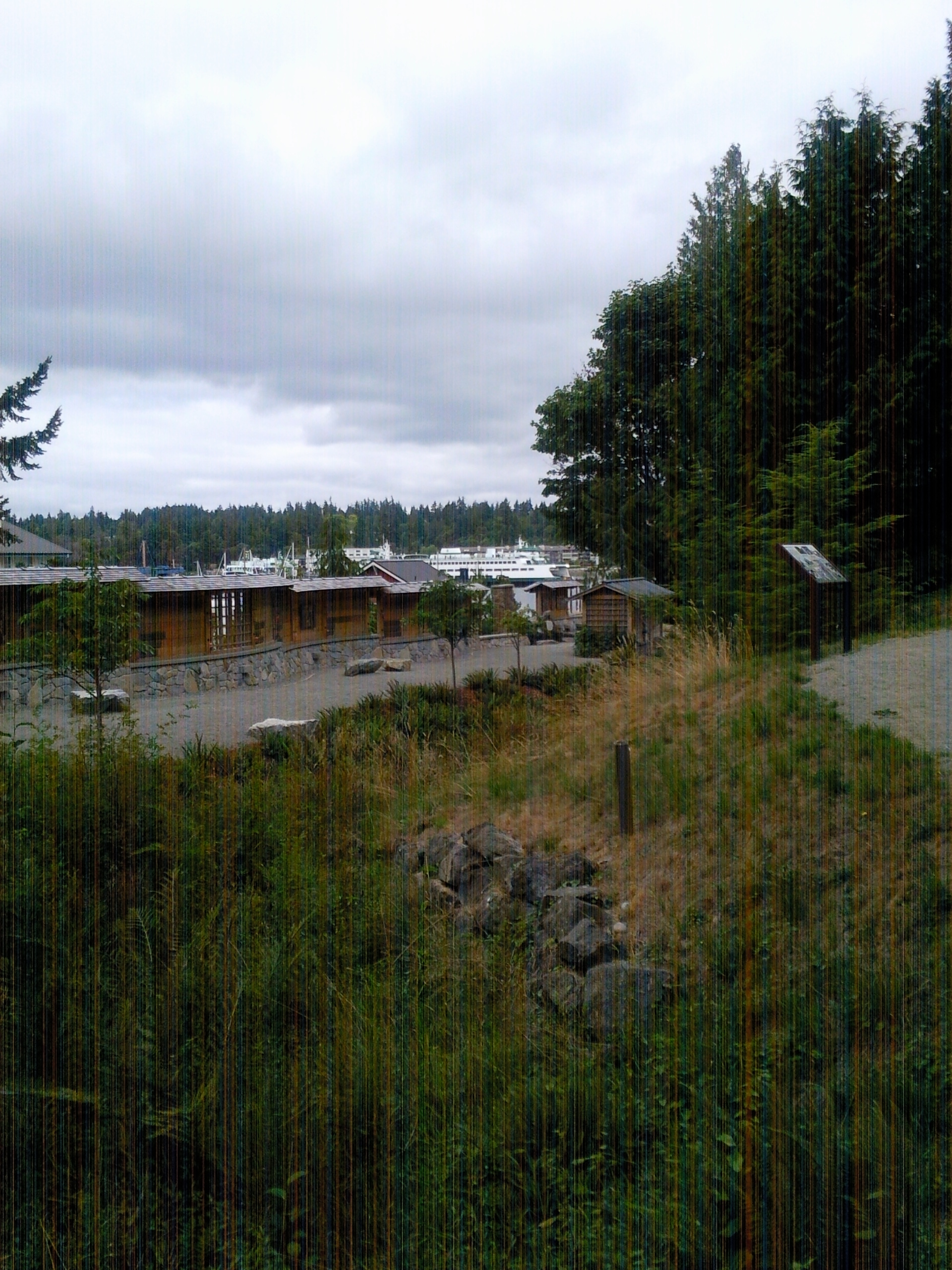
A view of the memorial from the south, showing the harbor in the background. The Seattle–Bainbridge Ferry terminal is on the other side of the harbor.

Japanese immigrants first came to Bainbridge Island in the 1880s, working in sawmills and strawberry harvesting, and by the 1940s had become an integral part of the island's community.

Because of the island's proximity to naval bases, local Japanese Americans were the first in the whole country to be incarcerated. 227 Japanese Americans were ordered to leave the island with six days' notice. They departed by ferry on March 30, 1942. The island had a total of 276 Japanese American residents at the time; those who were away from the island at the time due to study, military service, or other business were not permitted to return. Most incarcerees were sent to Manzanar, California, though the majority of them were later transferred to Minidoka. Walt and Milly Woodward, owners of the Local newspaper The Bainbridge Review (made famous by David Guterson's novel Snow Falling on Cedars) spoke out against the internment and continued to publish correspondence from designated island Japanese Americans in the camps. A Seattle Post-Intelligencer photograph of Bainbridge Island resident Fumiko Hayashida and her 13-month-old daughter preparing to board the ferry that day became famous as a symbol of the internment. 150 returned to the island after the end of World War II. By 2011, about 90 survivors remained, of whom 20 still lived on the island.

== The facility ==
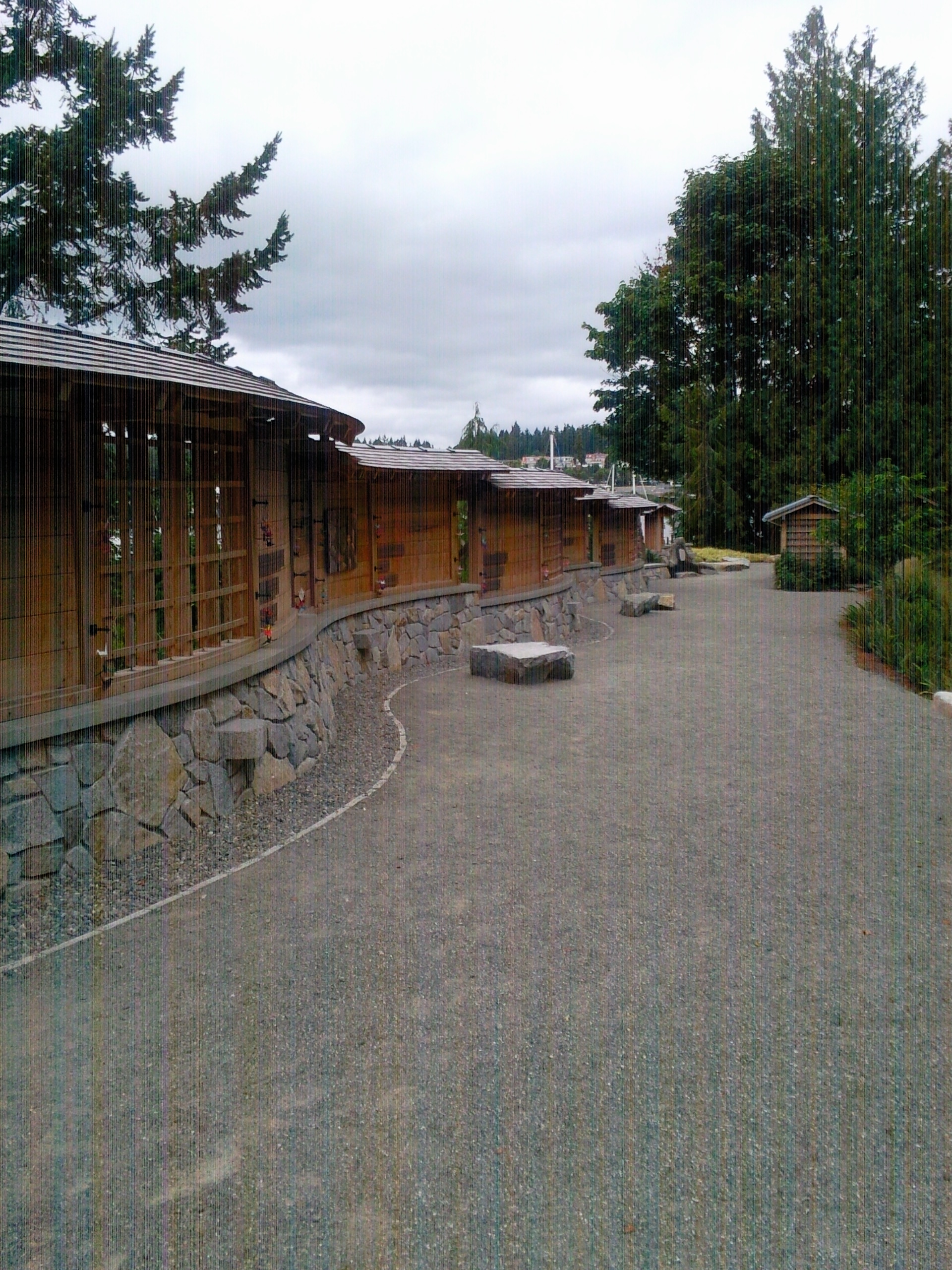
The cedar "story wall"

The organizing group behind the facility, the Bainbridge Japanese American Community, planned to build a $9 million facility with a pier and 4,000 square feet (370 m^{2}) interpretive center, next to Pritchard Park and the former Bainbridge Island ferry terminal. Congress voted to include the memorial in the Minidoka National Historic Site in May 2008 as part of the Consolidated Natural Resources Act of 2008. In October 2008 the organizing committee was spun off into its own 501(c)(3), the Bainbridge Island Japanese American Exclusion Memorial Association (BIJAEMA). By March 2009, BIJAEMA had raised $2.7 million of funding.

The first part of the memorial to be constructed was an outdoor cedar "story wall" with the names of all 276 Japanese Americans resident on the island at the time. The groundbreaking ceremony for the wall was held on March 30, 2009, the 67th anniversary of the forced removal of all Japanese Americans from Bainbridge Island. Fumiko Hayashida (then 98), the oldest surviving internee, spoke at the ceremony. The wall was designed by local architect Johnpaul Jones, an American Indian and the principal of Jones and Jones Architects. Jones also worked on landscape architecture in the vicinity of the memorial; he aimed for natural landscaping, planting native species including sword fern, mahonia, salal, and shore pine. Local artist Steve Gardner created friezes to be placed on the wall, depicting some of the scenes of residents being herded onto the ferries; he stated that the project "sucked me in in a way I hadn't thought about. This really is a story about American citizens." The memorial was opened to the public on July 30, 2011.

== See also ==
- Day of Remembrance (Japanese Americans)
- Densho: The Japanese American Legacy Project
- Empty Chair Memorial
- Fred Korematsu Day
- Go for Broke Monument
- Harada House
- Japanese American Memorial to Patriotism During World War II
- National Japanese American Veterans Memorial Court
- Sakura Square
