= Japanese-American Claims Act =

1948 U.S. Federal statute

The Japanese-American Claims Act is a law passed by the United States Congress and signed by President Harry S. Truman on July 2, 1948. The law authorized the settlement of property loss claims by people of Japanese descent who were removed from the Pacific Coast area during World War II. According to a Senate report on the Act, there were concerns about whether the United States government had the right to evacuate and place all people of Japanese ancestry in internment camps. As result of being placed in the Japanese internment camps there was great loss of property, belongings, business, "and the principles of justice and responsible government require that there should be compensation for such losses. "Congress over time appropriated $38 million to settle 23,000 claims for damages totaling $131 million. The final claim was adjudicated in 1965."

== History ==
The attack on Pearl Harbor was a surprise air strike by the Imperial Japanese Navy on the neutral United States in Oahu, Hawaii—with the focus being directed against the naval base at Pearl Harbor—on the morning of December 7, 1941. The attack sank four U.S. battleships, destroyed 188 U.S. aircraft, and killed nearly 2,500 people, leading to the United States joining World War II the next day. Once the United States entered the war and anti-Japanese sentiment began to circulate, Americans increasingly reacted with racism and hostility, viewing people of Japanese descent as enemies regardless of U.S. citizenship. The U.S. government expressed concerns about the loyalty of the Japanese people living in America and about Japanese spies sending information to Japan. As a result, the Treasury Department froze the assets of all citizens and resident aliens who were born in Japan, and the Department of Justice arrested some 1,500 religious and community leaders as potentially dangerous enemy aliens. The chief concern among military and political leaders was due to the fact many of the largest populations of Japanese Americans were in close proximity to vital war assets along the Pacific Coast.

In response to the public fears, President Franklin D. Roosevelt issued Executive Order 9066 on February 19, 1942. The order "granted the secretary of war and his commanders the power "to prescribe military areas in such places and of such extent as he or the appropriate Military Commander may determine, from which any or all persons may be excluded." While no specific group or location was mentioned in the order, it was quickly applied to virtually the entire Japanese American population on the West Coast."

Once Executive Order 9066 was issued all people of Japanese descent in the Western Defense Command were evacuated from their homes, forcibly relocated, and confined to relocation and then internment camps. They were only allowed to take what they could carry with them and were not told where they were going or how long they would be gone. By June, more than 110,000 Japanese Americans were relocated to remote internment camps built by the U.S. military in scattered locations around the country. For the next two and a half years, many of these Japanese Americans endured extremely difficult living conditions and poor treatment by their military guards.

During World War II, U.S. Major General Henry C. Pratt issues Public Proclamation No. 21, declaring that, effective January 2, 1945, Japanese American "evacuees" from the West Coast could return to their homes. In December 1944, the U.S. Supreme Court ruled in Ex parte Mitsuye Endo that it was beyond the power of the War Relocation Authority "to detain citizens against whom no charges of disloyalty or subversiveness have been made for a period longer than that necessary to separate the loyal from the disloyal."

In 1948, President Harry S. Truman signed the Evacuation Claims Act, which gave internees the opportunity to submit claims for property lost as a result of relocation.

== Claims Act of 1948 ==
Following is the text of the Claims Act of 1948: "That no amount received as an award under the Act entitled "An Act to authorize the Attorney General to adjudicate certain claims resulting from evacuation of certain persons of Japanese ancestry under military orders", approved July 2, 1948. As amended by Public Law 116 Eighty-second Congress, and Public Law 673, Eighty-fourth Congress (50U.S.6.App. sees.1981-1987), shall be included in gross income for purposes of chapter the Internal Revenue Code of 1939 or chapter 1 of the Internal Revenue Code of 1954."

"SEC.2. The first section of this Act shall apply with respect to taxable year sending after July 2, 1948. If refund or credit of any over payment of Federal income tax resulting from the application of the first section of this Act (Including interest, additions to the tax, additional amounts, and penalties) is prevented on the date of the enactment of this Act, or within one year from such date, by the operation of any law or rule of law, the refund or credit of such over payment may nevertheless be made or allowed if claim there for is filed within one year after the date of the enactment of this Act. In the case of a claim to which the preceding sentence applies the amount to be refunded or credited as an overpayment shall not be diminished by any creditor set-off based upon any item other than the amount of the award referred to in the first section of this Act. No interest shall be allowed or paid on any overpayment resulting from the application of this Act."

== Amendments ==
The Claims Act of 1948 was amended on June 5, 1956. "The purpose of the amendments is to establish $100,000 as the maximum award which the Attorney General may make in the compromise and settlement of a claim under the Japanese-American Evacuation Claims Act of 1948 without submission of a claim of the Court of Claims."

== Claims ==
Many former Japanese American internees had lost their property and their homes during internment; they had no place to go home to and had only a handful of belongings. The Claims Act was set up to help these people after release from the camps but it had its flaws. The processing of the claims took time and many of these people had nothing and were in urgent need of money for shelter and food after the camps closed. An example of such involves a claim filed by Toshi Shimomaye, who was forced to sell several possessions to the highest bidder that resulted in a net loss of several hundred dollars.
