= Go for Broke Monument =

Monument in Los Angeles, California, United States

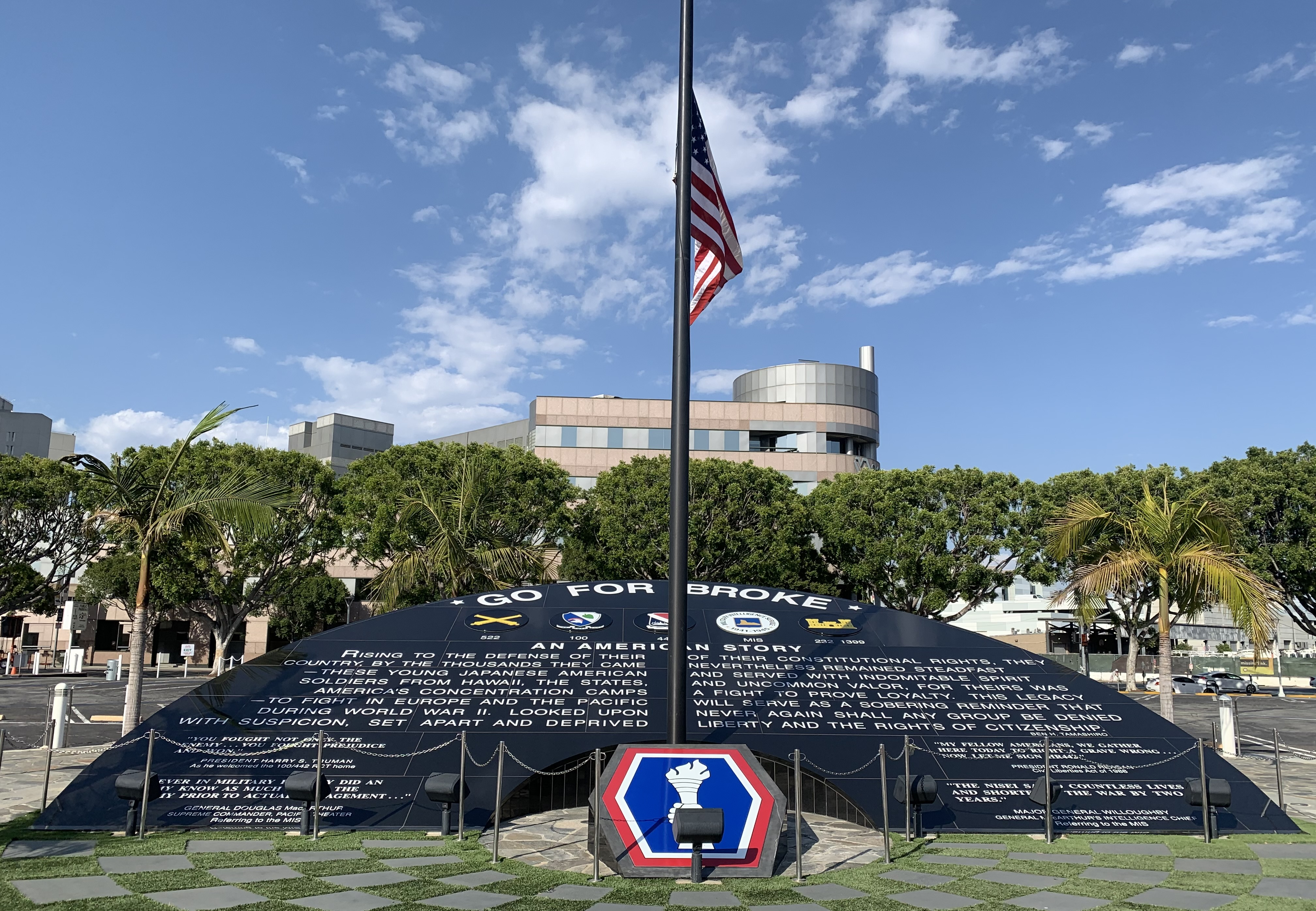
- Interactive map of Go for Broke Monument
- Location: 355 E. 1st Street, Los Angeles, California, 90012
- Coordinates: 34.051181°N 118.239019°W
- Designer: Roger M. Yanagita
- Beginning date: 1991
- Dedicated date: June 5, 1999
- Website: http://www.goforbroke.org/

The Go for Broke Monument (Japanese: 日系人部隊記念碑, Nikkeijinbutai Kinenhi) in Little Tokyo, Los Angeles, California, commemorates Japanese Americans who served in the United States Army during World War II. It was created by Los Angeles architect Roger M. Yanagita whose winning design was selected over 138 other submissions from around the world.

Design and construction of the monument commenced in 1991 with the dedication occurring on June 5, 1999. It is located at the end of North Central Street, adjacent to the Japanese American National Museum, and is bordered on three sides by a pay-parking lot serving East Temple Street. The monument is accessible by the public at no cost.

== Monument ==
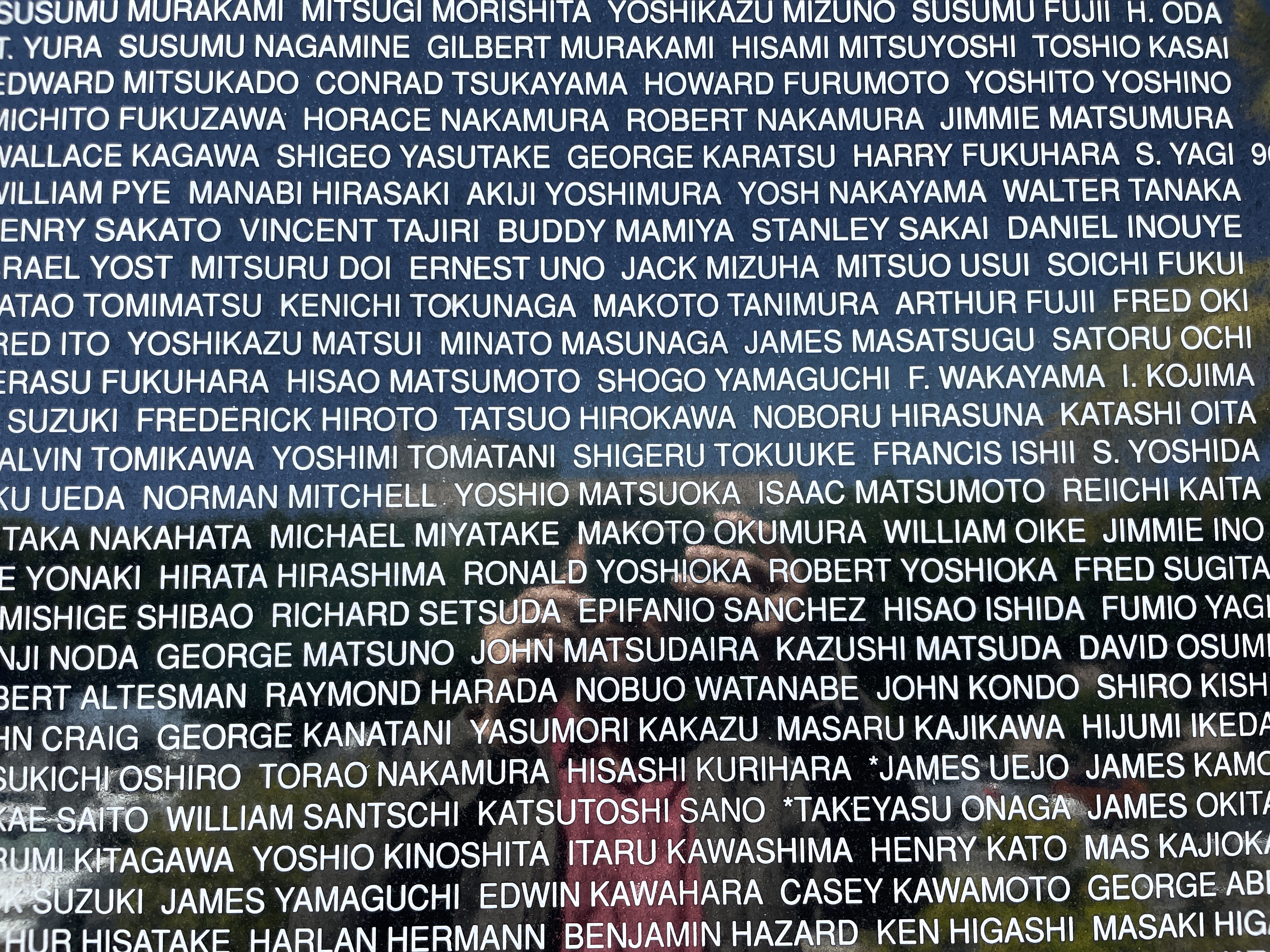
Detail of some of the names listed on the back of the monument

The monument has a large semicircular face of polished black stone, set at an angle facing the Sun as it is perceived as traveling across the southern sky, and embracing a pole upon which the American flag flies. The monument's curved back wall lists the names of 16,126 nisei soldiers. At the foot of the flag is the shoulder flash of the all-Nisei 442nd Regimental Combat Team.

Across the top of the face is the motto: "Go For Broke" and below that are the insignia of the segregated, all-Nisei Army units: the famed 100th Infantry Battalion and 442nd Regimental Combat Team, as well as lesser-known nisei units, the Military Intelligence Service (MIS), 522nd Field Artillery Battalion, 232nd Combat Engineer Company, and the 1399th Engineering Construction Battalion.

"Remember Pearl Harbor!" was the unit motto of the 100th Battalion, while "Go for Broke" was that of the 442nd RCT. It has since been adopted as a motto for all of the Japanese-American units formed during World War II.

The monument's main feature, a large inscription on the face, describes how they served even as they were being deprived of their constitutional rights during the period of forced removal and incarceration. This inscription uses the term concentration camps to describe the facilities then officially called relocation centers. The inscription is attributed to 100th Infantry Battalion veteran Ben Tamashiro, best known for his more than 60 appearances in television advertisements for the Bank of Hawaii. According to his 2004 obituary in the Honolulu Advertiser and Honolulu Star-Bulletin:

After a nationwide search failed to elicit an appropriate inscription, his former commanding officer — Col. Young Oak Kim, who was in charge of the project — wrote to Tamashiro, according to his daughter. The words Tamashiro sent back were the ones chosen — with a single change. Instead of "internment camps" as he had written, the inscription was changed to "concentration camps."

Interpretive information is available from the Japanese American National Museum and a kiosk beside the monument. Also, the monument is often attended by veterans of the nisei units, who explain the monument and the events of World War II, and answer questions.

== Inscription ==
GO FOR BROKE – An American Story

Rising to the defense of their country, by the thousands they came – these young Japanese American soldiers from Hawaii, the states, America's concentration camps – to fight in Europe and the Pacific during World War II. Looked upon with suspicion, set apart and deprived of their constitutional rights, they nevertheless remained steadfast and served with indomitable spirit and uncommon valor, for theirs was a fight to prove loyalty. This legacy will serve as a sobering reminder that never again shall any group be denied liberty and the rights of citizenship. – Ben H. Tamashiro

"You not only fought the enemy . . . you fought prejudice and won." – President Harry S. Truman as he welcomed the 100/442 RCT home

"Never in military history did an army know as much about the enemy prior to actual engagement." – General Douglas MacArthur, Supreme Commander, Pacific Theater, referring to the MIS

"My fellow Americans, we gather here today to right a grave wrong . . . now let me sign H.R. 442." – President Ronald Reagan, Civil Liberties Act of 1988

"The Nisei saved countless lives and shortened the war by two years." – Charles A. Willoughby, General MacArthur's Intelligence Officer, referring to the MIS

== See also ==
- Go for Broke! (1951 film)
- Japanese American service in World War II
- Bainbridge Island Japanese American Exclusion Memorial
- Day of Remembrance (Japanese Americans)
- Densho: The Japanese American Legacy Project
- Empty Chair Memorial
- Fred Korematsu Day
- Harada House
- Japanese American Memorial to Patriotism During World War II
- National Japanese American Veterans Memorial Court
- Nisei VFW Post 8985
- Sakura Square
- Sadao Munemori
- Young-Oak Kim
