= Empty Chair Memorial =

Memorial in Juneau, Alaska

Coordinates: 58.3028°N 134.4107°W

The Empty Chair Memorial (Japanese: 空席の椅子の記念碑, Kūseki no Isu no Kinenhi) is a memorial located at Capital School Park in downtown Juneau, Alaska, United States. It is dedicated to the 53 Juneau residents of Japanese origin who were forcibly relocated and imprisoned in inland internment camps during World War II, as well as to recognize Juneau citizens for their helpful response when the families returned after the war. It is the first memorial in Alaska regarding the internment of Japanese Americans during the war.

The title of the memorial refers to a student named John Minoru Tanaka, a Juneau High School valedictorian who was relocated a month before his graduation in May 1942. His classmates left an empty chair to recognize him, and, by extension, other local Japanese families, at their graduation ceremonies.

== Background ==
Much like the rest of the West Coast, Japanese immigrants began arriving at Alaska in the late 19th and early 20th centuries, where they were drawn by fisheries, mining, logging, agriculture, and other labor-intensive industries. At the time of the Japanese immigration to Alaska, it was under a district status since 1884 and under a territorial status since 1912. Some migrated to Juneau, where they later operated businesses within the city. Unlike most of the West Coast, by 1941, the Japanese population in Alaska was generally small of roughly 200. Also, Japanese residents in Juneau were fairly well treated by their white neighbors. Their children were popular in school and most ethnic Japanese were well integrated into the city's community.

== Internment during World War II and aftermath ==
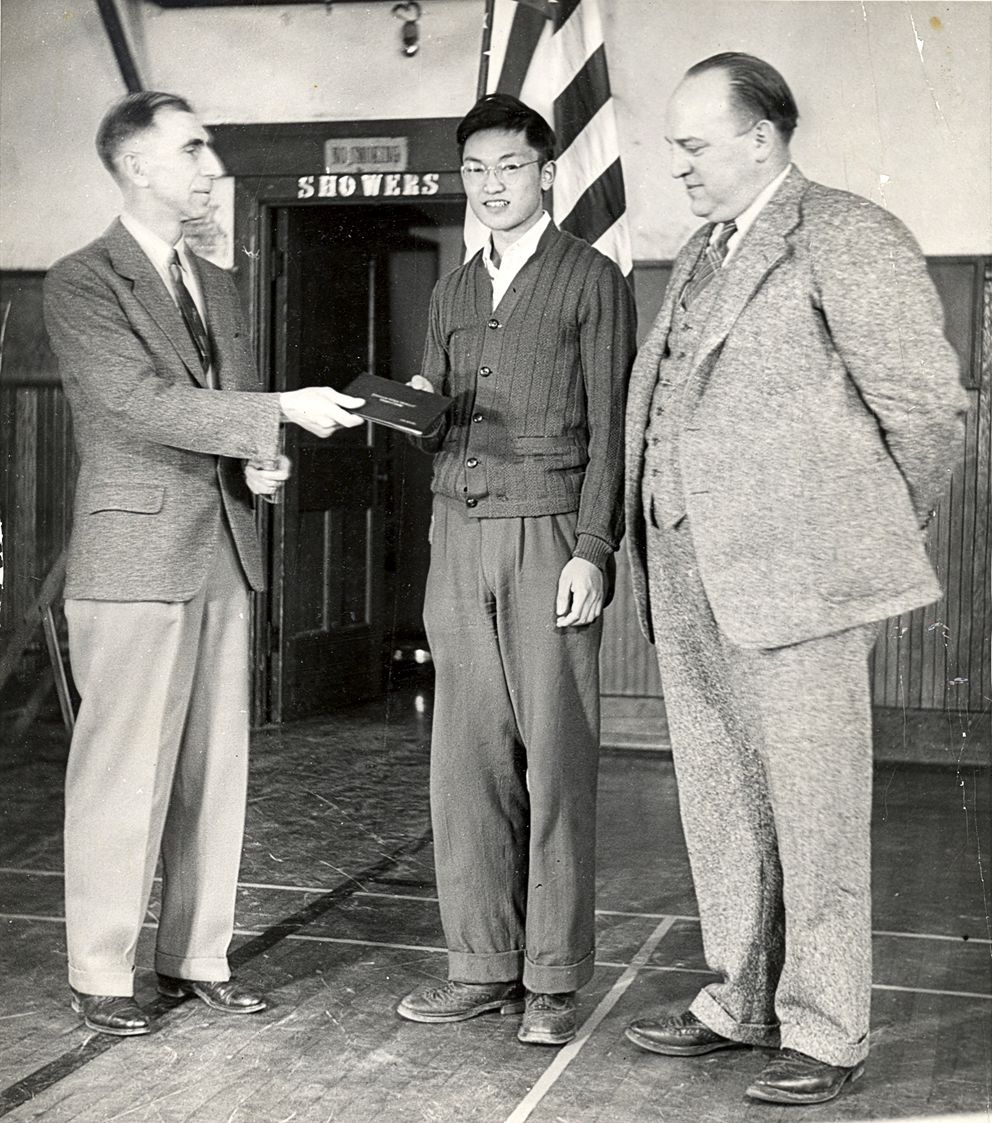
Valedictorian John Tanaka received his diploma at the Juneau High School gym during a special graduation ceremony on April 15, 1942

Following the attack on Pearl Harbor by the Empire of Japan and the U.S. entry into World War II, President Franklin D. Roosevelt signed Executive Order 9066 on February 19, 1942, which gave military commanders the authority to exclude specified persons from certain areas, paving way for the incarceration of Japanese Americans. Unlike California, Oregon, and Washington which were designated as military exclusion zones that evicted all Japanese residents there to inland internment camps, Alaska was not included on the list due to its small Japanese populace. Nevertheless, the territory's Japanese residents were forced to leave by the Western Defense Command.

One of the notable ethnic Japanese from Juneau was John Minoru Tanaka, a Juneau High School valedictorian, who later served as an inspiration for the Empty Chair Memorial. His father, Shonosuke Tanaka, owned the popular City Cafe in the city for decades and was among the 15 Japanese nationals arrested by the FBI immediately after the Pearl Harbor attack, where they were incarcerated along with two German citizens for several months at Fort Richardson in Anchorage, Alaska. In April 1942, when all ethnic Japanese in Alaska were ordered to leave for internment camps inland, a special ceremony was held on the 15th at the school gymnasium where John received his diploma. During the official graduation in May 1942, Tanaka's classmates placed an empty wooden folding chair to symbolize his absence.

By the end of April, a total of 53 persons of Japanese ancestry left their homes and businesses in Juneau to internment camps inland. John, his brother (William), his mother (Nobu), and his two sisters (Alice and Mary) were taken on a United States Army transport ship to Seattle for processing at Puyallup Assembly Center and then onto Minidoka War Relocation Center in Idaho, where they were incarcerated during the remainder of the war. Shonosuke would later be sent to the United States Department of Justice prison in Lordsburg, New Mexico for a few years before rejoining his family in 1944. While at Minidoka, John volunteered for the U.S. Army and served with the 442nd Infantry Regiment in Europe.

After the war, most Juneau Japanese families returned to the city and re-established themselves, including the Tanaka family. Welcomed back, they found that residents had watched out for their interests in their absence. Unlike Japanese elsewhere in the country, they were able to resume their prior lives without serious difficulties, a testament to the decency of the people living in Juneau in the mid 20th Century. Following his military discharge in 1946, John enrolled and graduated at the University of Washington where he later went to the St. Louis University School of Medicine and became an anesthesiologist. He died in 1978, survived by his wife, Jeanne Tanaka, and his five children.

== Memorial ==
In July 2012, Seattle artist Peter Reiquam submitted a preliminary proposal to the Empty Chair Project Steering Committee which has met with their approval. His design was inspired by a wooden folding chair that would have been used for John Tanaka, who left Juneau a month before the actual graduation ceremony in 1942 in which his classmates left for him to honor his absence.

The project then took over a span of two years through fundraising and grants from various organizations including the National Park Service's Japanese American Confinement Sites program.

On July 12, 2014, the Empty Chair Memorial was dedicated at Capital School Park in Juneau, with 200 people in attendance. More than 1,000 origami cranes were made for the ceremony. The memorial is a bronze reproduction of a simple folding chair and has a spartan aura, sequestered in the park with a jagged chunk of planked flooring. Reiquam said that:

[T]he irregular edge of the floor was intended to represent a section of the gymnasium floor that had just been ripped out of the gymnasium as a metaphor for the way that the people were ripped from their homes and their community.

The names of the 53 people forced to leave their homes for internment camps during World War II are etched into the floor planks. The communal, military-style camps were ringed by barbed wire and guard towers. Mary Tanaka Abo, one of John Tanaka's sisters, attended the dedication ceremony along with her extended family, as well as Alice Tanaka Hikido, and Jeanne Tanaka, John's widow.

== See also ==
- List of Japanese American Confinement Sites
- Bainbridge Island Japanese American Exclusion Memorial
- Day of Remembrance (Japanese Americans)
- Densho: The Japanese American Legacy Project
- Fred Korematsu Day
- Go for Broke Monument
- Harada House
- Japanese American Memorial to Patriotism During World War II
- National Japanese American Veterans Memorial Court
- Sakura Square
