= Civil Liberties Act of 1988 =

Law granting reparations to interned Japanese Americans

- Enacted by: the 100th United States Congress

Citations
- Public law: Pub. L. 100–383
- Statutes at Large: 102 Stat. 903

Legislative history
- Introduced in the House as "Civil Liberties Act of 1987" (H.R. 442) by Tom Foley (D-WA) on January 6, 1987; Committee consideration by House Judiciary, Senate Governmental; Passed the House on September 17, 1987 (243–141); Passed the Senate on April 20, 1988 (69–27, in lieu of S. 1009); Reported by the joint conference committee on July 26, 1988; agreed to by the Senate on July 27, 1988 (voice vote) and by the House on August 4, 1988 (257–156); Signed into law by President Ronald Reagan on August 10, 1988

The Civil Liberties Act of 1988 (Pub. L. 100–383, title I, August 10, 1988, 102 Stat. 904, 50a U.S.C. § 1989b et seq.) is a United States federal law that granted reparations to Japanese Americans who had been wrongly interned by the United States government during World War II and to "discourage the occurrence of similar injustices and violations of civil liberties in the future". The act was sponsored by California Democratic congressman and former internee Norman Mineta in the House and Hawaii Democratic senator Spark Matsunaga in the Senate. The bill was supported by the majority of Democrats in Congress, while the majority of Republicans voted against it. The act was signed into law by President Ronald Reagan.

The act granted each surviving internee $20,000 in compensation, equivalent to $46,000 in 2024, with payments beginning in 1990. The legislation stated that government actions had been based on "race prejudice, war hysteria, and a failure of political leadership" as opposed to legitimate security reasons. A total of 82,219 received redress checks.

Because the law was restricted to American citizens and legal permanent residents, ethnic Japanese who had been taken from their homes in Latin America (mostly from Peru) were not granted reparations, regardless of whether they had remained in the United States, had returned to Latin America or had been deported to Japan after the war. In 1996, Carmen Mochizuki filed a class-action lawsuit and won a settlement of approximately $5,000 per eligible person. Of those affected, 145 received their settlement before funds were exhausted. In 1999, funds were approved for the attorney general to pay compensation to the remaining claimants.

== Background ==
=== Internment of Japanese Americans ===
The internment of Japanese Americans was the forced removal and confinement of approximately 120,000 Japanese Americans (62% of whom were United States citizens) from the West Coast of the United States during World War II. Some 5,500 Japanese American men arrested by the FBI immediately after the attack on Pearl Harbor were sent directly to internment camps run by the Department of Justice, and approximately 5,000 were able to "voluntarily" relocate to other parts of the country before forced evacuations began. The remainder – over 110,000 men, women and children – were sent to "relocation centers", hastily constructed camps in remote portions of the nation's interior run by the War Relocation Authority (WRA).

President Franklin D. Roosevelt authorized the internment with Executive Order 9066, which allowed local military commanders to designate "military areas" from which "any or all persons may be excluded." This power was used to declare that all people of Japanese ancestry were excluded from the continental Pacific coast region, including all of Alaska and California, and parts of Oregon, Washington, and Arizona, except for those in government custody. In 1944, the Supreme Court upheld the constitutionality of the exclusion, removal, and detention, arguing that it is permissible to curtail the civil rights of a racial group when there is a "pressing public necessity."

=== Redress and reparations ===
Some compensation for property losses was paid in 1948, but most internees were unable to fully recover their losses. In the 1960s and 1970s, a renewed movement formed within the Japanese American community to obtain redress for the wartime incarceration. The Japanese American Citizens League introduced a resolution to seek individual reparations at its 1970 conference and soon after began working with community activists and political leaders to lobby for legislative action. In 1979, the National Council for Japanese American Redress filed a class-action lawsuit against the federal government on behalf of former camp inmates, and in 1980, after a push from senator Daniel Inouye and congressmen Robert Matsui, Spark Matsunaga and Norman Mineta, Congress appointed a committee to study the effects of the incarceration and the potential for redress. The Commission on Wartime Relocation and Internment of Civilians held investigative hearings in 11 U.S. cities, at which more than 750 people provided testimony of their experiences during and after the war. In 1983, the commission published its findings in the report Personal Justice Denied, writing that the displacement of Japanese Americans during the war had been the result of "race prejudice, war hysteria and a failure of political leadership" and recommending monetary reparations be made to former internees. Although the bill to issue a formal apology and implement the CWRIC's recommendations, introduced in 1987, faced heavy resistance from President Reagan and Senate Republicans opposed to increased federal spending, it was signed into law on August 10, 1988.

On October 9, 1990, a ceremony was held to present the first reparations checks. Nine elderly Issei received $20,000 each and a formal apology signed by President George H. W. Bush. United States Attorney General Dick Thornburgh presented the checks to the attendees, dropping to his knees to reach those in wheelchairs.

Payments to surviving internees or their heirs continued until 1993, overseen by the Office of Redress Administration, one of two government agencies created to carry out the 1988 act's implementation. The other, the Civil Liberties Public Education Fund, was established in order to meet the redress bill's provision to educate the public about the incarceration. $50 million was authorized "to sponsor research and public educational activities" in 1988, but anti-spending lobbying put the education program on hold until 1994 and reduced the final amount to $5 million. President Bill Clinton appointed an advisory board in 1996, and the CLPEF was used to fund various educational programs and grants from 1997 to 1998.

== Civil Liberties Act of 1988 ==
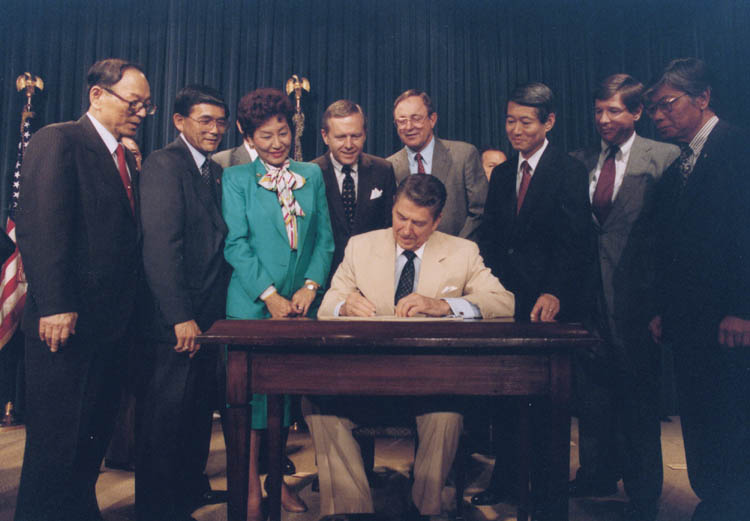
President Reagan signs the bill in an official ceremony. Left to right: Hawaii Sen. Spark Matsunaga, California Rep. Norman Mineta, Hawaii Rep. Pat Saiki, California Sen. Pete Wilson, Alaska Rep. Don Young, California Rep. Bob Matsui, California Rep. Bill Lowery, and JACL President Harry Kajihara.

Video of event

The Civil Liberties Act of 1988, Restitution for World War II internment of Japanese-Americans and Aleuts, states that it is intended to:

1. acknowledge the fundamental injustice of the evacuation, relocation, and internment of United States citizens and permanent resident aliens of Japanese ancestry during World War II;
2. apologize on behalf of the people of the United States for the evacuation, relocation, and internment of such citizens and permanent resident aliens;
3. provide for a public education fund to finance efforts to inform the public about the internment of such individuals so as to prevent the recurrence of any similar event;
4. make restitution to those individuals of Japanese ancestry who were interned;
5. make restitution to Aleut residents of the Pribilof Islands and the Aleutian Islands west of Unimak Island, in settlement of United States obligations in equity and at law, for –
  1. injustices suffered and unreasonable hardships endured while those Aleut residents were under United States control during World War II;
  2. personal property taken or destroyed by United States forces during World War II;
  3. community property, including community church property, taken or destroyed by United States forces during World War II; and
  4. traditional village lands on Attu Island not rehabilitated after World War II for Aleut occupation or other productive use;
6. discourage the occurrence of similar injustices and violations of civil liberties in the future; and
7. make more credible and sincere any declaration of concern by the United States over violations of human rights committed by other nations.

== Congressional support and opposition ==
On September 17, 1987, the U.S. House of Representatives passed the bill (which symbolically shared its number with that of the 442nd Infantry Regiment) by a vote of 243 to 141, with 38 members not voting. The majority of Democrats in the House voted for the bill (180 in favor vs. 43 opposed) while a majority of Republicans voted against it (63 in favor vs. 98 opposed). On April 20, 1988, the U.S. Senate passed the bill by a vote of 69 to 27, with 4 members not voting. A large majority of Democrats voted for the bill (44 in favor vs. 7 opposed), while a more narrow majority of Senate Republicans also voted for the bill (25 in favor vs. 20 opposed).

== See also ==
- Day of Remembrance (Japanese Americans)
- Go for Broke Monument
- Grayce Uyehara
- Japanese American Memorial to Patriotism During World War II
- Japanese American National Library
- Manzanar
- Reparations (transitional justice)
