= Eric Yamamoto =

American lawyer

- Occupation: Law Professor/Scholar
- Years active: 1975–present
- Known for: Scholarship In Racial Justice: Racial Reconciliation & Redress

Eric Yamamoto (publishing as Eric K. Yamamoto), the Korematsu Professor of Law and Social Justice at the William S. Richardson School of Law at the University of Hawaiʻi at Mānoa, is an internationally recognized expert on issues of racial justice, including racial reconciliation and redress. Flowing from the landmark 1944 Korematsu v. United States case, he is known for his work as a member of Fred Korematsu's 1983 legal team that succeeded in having Korematsu's original conviction overturned.

== Background ==
After graduating from the University of Hawaiʻi at Mānoa in 1975, Yamamoto earned his Juris Doctor from the University of California Berkeley, School of Law in 1978.

== Advocacy ==
Yamamoto worked on Korematsu v. United States, a landmark United States Supreme Court case that challenged the constitutionality of Executive Order 9066 during World War II which led to the internment of 120,000 Japanese Americans from California, the Pacific Northwest, and the Territory of Alaska. As a member of Fred Korematsu's legal team, Yamamoto provided co-counsel for his 1983 coram nobis petition, successfully challenging the constitutionality of his conviction for resisting internment, resulting in Korematsu's original conviction being overturned.

== Scholarship ==
Among his other writings, Yamamoto is the award-winning author and coauthor of two books:

- Interracial Justice: Conflict and Reconciliation In Post-Civil Rights America
- Race, Rights, and Reparation: Law and the Japanese American Internment

As well as the sole author of one book about the Korematsu case:

- In the Shadow of Korematsu (2018)

== Awards ==
In 2012, the Consortium of Asian-American Law Professors created a national award in Yamamoto's name, "The Professor Eric Y. Yamamoto Emerging Scholar Award," in recognition of his "exemplary scholarship in racial justice and inspiration to emerging scholars." The award is to be granted annually to a United States law professor that is early in career who demonstrates outstanding promise.

In 2006, the Society of American Law Teachers (SALT) awarded Yamamoto its national "Great Teacher Award," awarded annually, in recognition of both his "teaching of social justice" and for "expanding access to justice."
