= Marilyn Hall Patel =

American judge (born 1938)

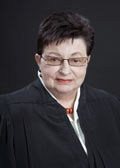

Senior Judge of the United States District Court for the Northern District of California
- In office October 30, 2009 – September 30, 2012

Chief Judge of the United States District Court for the Northern District of California
- In office 1997–2004
- Preceded by: Thelton Henderson
- Succeeded by: Vaughn Walker

Judge of the United States District Court for the Northern District of California
- In office June 30, 1980 – October 30, 2009
- Appointed by: Jimmy Carter
- Preceded by: Seat established by 71 Stat. 586
- Succeeded by: Edward Davila

Personal details
- Born: Marilyn Hall; September 2, 1938 (age 87) Amsterdam, New York, U.S.
- Education: Wheaton College (BA); Fordham University (JD)

Marilyn Hall Patel (born September 2, 1938) is a former United States district judge of the United States District Court for the Northern District of California.

== Education and career ==
Patel was born Marilyn Hall in 1938, in Amsterdam, New York. She received a Bachelor of Arts degree in 1959 from Wheaton College and a Juris Doctor in 1963 from Fordham University School of Law. She worked in private practice in New York City from 1963 to 1967. She was an attorney with the Immigration and Naturalization Service of the United States Department of Justice in San Francisco, California from 1967 to 1971. She worked in private practice in San Francisco from 1971 to 1976. During this time she was counsel for the National Organization for Women and was a member of the NOW Legal Defense and Education Fund's Board of Directors. She was an adjunct professor of law at the University of California, Hastings College of the Law from 1974 to 1976. She was a judge of the Oakland-Piedmont Municipal Court in California from 1976 to 1980.

== Federal judicial service ==
Patel was nominated by President Jimmy Carter on May 9, 1980, to the United States District Court for the Northern District of California, to a new seat authorized by 71 Stat. 586 following the certification of Lloyd Hudson Burke as disabled. She was confirmed by the United States Senate on June 26, 1980, and received her commission on June 30, 1980. She served as Chief Judge from 1997 to 2004. Patel was both the first female judge and first female Chief Judge of the district. She assumed senior status on October 30, 2009. She retired on September 30, 2012.

== Personal life ==
In 1966 Patel married Indian-American banker Magan C. Patel. The couple have two sons. Patel won the California Women Lawyers' Rose Bird Memorial Award in 2003.

== Notable cases ==
- Korematsu v. United States — Patel heard a petition for a writ of coram nobis filed by attorneys Peter Irons and Dale Minami asking the judge to vacate the conviction in the 40-year-old case of Korematsu v. United States. Fred Korematsu, a Japanese American, had been convicted of failing to comply with government orders to leave his home in San Leandro, California and enter an internment camp during World War II. Finding that the U.S. government had deliberately misled the Supreme Court in securing its affirmation of Korematsu's conviction, on November 10, 1983, Patel formally vacated the conviction, writing in her opinion, "[Korematsu] stands as a caution that in times of distress the shield of military necessity and national security must not be used to protect governmental actions from close scrutiny and accountability."
- A & M Records, Inc. v. Napster, Inc., commonly known as RIAA v. Napster — Patel ruled that Napster was not an ISP in the definition specified by the Digital Millennium Copyright Act, and thus was not entitled to protection under that law's "safe harbor" provision. Patel's injunction and final ruling (largely upheld on appeal by the United States Court of Appeals for the Ninth Circuit) meant that Napster was responsible for policing its internet file sharing network for materials that violate record companies' copyrights.
- Bernstein v. US Department of State — Daniel J. Bernstein, a college computer science professor, sued the U.S. Government alleging that the government's restrictions on the export of "dual use" cryptographic technology violated his rights under the First Amendment. Patel supported the plaintiff's argument that computer source code was indeed protected speech, and that the blanket requirements imposed by the AECA and ITAR regulations, (which required licences for "export", which Bernstein contended essentially amounted to "publication", of cryptographic algorithms or technologies) amounted to an impermissible prior restraint of Bernstein's free speech rights under the First Amendment. Patel's decision was affirmed on appeal to the Ninth Circuit.
- National Federation of the Blind v. Target Corporation — National Federation of the Blind sued Target Corporation, alleging that its electronic commerce website does not comply with the Americans with Disabilities Act of 1990. Patel ruled that a retailer can be sued if its website is inaccessible to the blind.

== Other notable cases ==
In a 1987 suit brought against the Fire Department of San Francisco (in which Patel harshly criticized the department), she issued a consent decree that enforced equal access to employment and advancement at the SFFD. In addition to clarifying the department's responsibilities with regard to the race of applicants, the decree ensured access for women to front-line firefighter roles.

In a 1999 ruling, Patel found that the layout of Macy's department stores violated the Americans with Disabilities Act, forcing the chain to significantly widen the aisles between merchandise. Many other retailers in other jurisdictions followed suit.

In 2003 she overturned the double murder conviction of Foster City, California native Glen William "Buddy" Nickerson. Nickerson had spent nineteen years on death row at San Quentin State Prison before new witnesses and evidence of police misconduct came to light. Ruling, Patel said it was "more probable than not" that Nickerson was innocent.

Patel dismissed a 2005 suit brought by San Franciscan Wayne Ritchie against the US Government in which he alleged he had been harmed by the covert administration of LSD as part of the MKULTRA program.

Patel determined that California's method of execution by lethal cyanide gas violates the Eighth Amendment prohibition of "cruel and unusual punishments" after privately viewing a recording of the execution of Robert Alton Harris. Her colleague, Judge Jeremy Fogel, has considered the constitutionality of California's lethal-injection protocol in a few cases, most notably Morales v. Tilton.

Patel's decisions in 2008 included one for the plaintiffs in Okinawa Dugong v. Gates/Okinawa Dugong v. Rumsfeld, in which an environmental group sought to prevent the construction of a military runway on the island of Okinawa, citing the hazard this may pose to the okinawa dugong, a relative of the manatee and an endangered marine mammal.

In 2007 and 2008, Patel reviewed the standards employed by the Oakland Police Department for public strip and body cavity searches. Patel ruled that the O.P.D.'s policy permitting such searches in cases of reasonable suspicion was unconstitutionally low, permitting future searches only where there is probable cause—the same standard required to arrest suspects.

== See also ==
- List of first women lawyers and judges in California

Legal offices
Preceded by Seat established by 71 Stat. 586	Judge of the United States District Court for the Northern District of California; 1980–2009	Succeeded by Edward J. Davila
Preceded by Thelton Henderson	Chief Judge of the United States District Court for the Northern District of California; 1997–2004	Succeeded by Vaughn Walker
