= Fred Korematsu =

Japanese-American civil rights activist (1919–2005)

Fred Korematsu 是松豊三郎
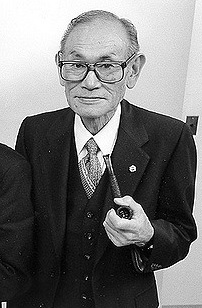
- Born: Fred Toyosaburo Korematsu; January 30, 1919; Oakland, California, U.S.
- Died: March 30, 2005 (aged 86); Marin County, California, U.S.
- Resting place: Mountain View Cemetery; 37°50′06″N 122°14′12″W
- Monuments: Fred T. Korematsu Elementary School in Davis; Fred T. Korematsu Campus of San Leandro High School; Fred T. Korematsu Discovery Academy in Oakland; Fred T. Korematsu Middle School in El Cerrito; Fred. T Korematsu Center for Law and Equality of University of California, Irvine School of Law
- Education: Castlemont High School
- Known for: Korematsu v. United States
- Spouse: Kathryn Pearson (m. 1946)
- Children: 2
- Awards: Presidential Medal of Freedom (1998)
- Website: korematsuinstitute.org

Fred Toyosaburo Korematsu (是松豊三郎, Korematsu Toyosaburō; January 30, 1919 – March 30, 2005) was an American civil rights activist who resisted the internment of Japanese Americans during World War II. Shortly after the Imperial Japanese Navy launched its attack on Pearl Harbor, President Franklin D. Roosevelt issued Executive Order 9066, which authorized the removal of individuals of Japanese ancestry living on the West Coast from their homes and their mandatory imprisonment in incarceration camps. Korematsu challenged the order and became a fugitive.

The legality of Roosevelt's order was upheld by the Supreme Court of the United States in Korematsu v. United States (1944). However, Korematsu's conviction for evading internment was overturned four decades later in US District Court, after the disclosure of new evidence challenging its necessity, which had been withheld from the courts by the U.S. government during the war. Korematsu was discussed seventy-four years later in Trump v. Hawaii (2018), with Chief Justice John Roberts writing: "The forcible relocation of U.S. citizens to concentration camps, solely and explicitly on the basis of race, is objectively unlawful and outside the scope of Presidential authority." Legal scholars differ as to whether this statement actually overturned Korematsu or was merely a "disapproving dictum" of it.

To commemorate his journey as a civil rights activist posthumously, "Fred Korematsu Day of Civil Liberties and the Constitution" was observed for the first time on his 92nd birthday, January 30, 2011, by the state of California, the first such commemoration for an Asian American in the United States. In 2015, Virginia passed legislation to make it the second state to permanently recognize each January 30 as Fred Korematsu Day.

The Fred T. Korematsu Institute was founded in 2009 to carry on Korematsu's legacy as a civil rights advocate by educating and advocating for civil liberties for all communities.

== Youth ==
Fred Toyosaburo Korematsu was born in Oakland, California, on January 30, 1919, the third of four sons to Japanese parents Kakusaburo Korematsu and Kotsui Aoki, who immigrated to the United States in 1905. Korematsu resided continuously in Oakland from his birth until the time of his arrest. He attended public schools, participated in the Castlemont High School (Oakland, California) tennis and swim teams, and worked in his family's flower nursery in nearby San Leandro, California. He encountered racism in high school when a U.S. Army recruiting officer was handing out recruiting flyers to Korematsu's non-Japanese friends. The officer told Korematsu, "We have orders not to accept you." Even his girlfriend Ida Boitano's Italian parents felt that people of Japanese descent were inferior and unfit to mix with white people.

== World War II ==
When called for military duty under the Selective Training and Service Act of 1940, Korematsu was formally rejected by the U.S. Navy due to stomach ulcers, but it is believed that he was truly rejected on the basis of his Japanese descent. Instead, he trained to become a welder in order to contribute his services to the defense effort. First, he worked as a welder at a shipyard. He went in one day to find his timecard missing; his coworkers hastily explained to him that he was Japanese so therefore he was not allowed to work there. He then found a new job, but was fired after a week when his supervisor returned from an extended vacation and found him working there. Because of his Japanese descent, Korematsu lost all employment completely following the attack on Pearl Harbor.

On March 27, 1942, General John L. DeWitt, commander of the Western Defense Area, prohibited Japanese Americans from leaving the limits of Military Area No. 1, (Note: Military Area No. 1 was defined as the entire California, Oregon, and Washington coasts, as well as the southern sections of California and Arizona along the border of Mexico.) in preparation for their eventual evacuation to internment camps. Korematsu underwent plastic surgery on his eyelids in an unsuccessful attempt to pass as a Caucasian, changed his name to Clyde Sarah and claimed to be of Spanish and Hawaiian heritage.

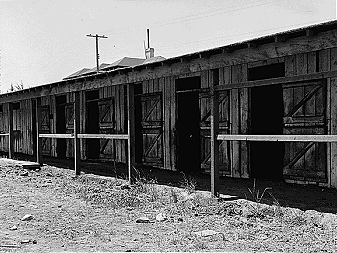
Former horse stalls converted for temporary occupation by Japanese American internees at Tanforan Assembly Center, San Bruno, California, 1942

When on May 3, 1942, General DeWitt ordered Japanese Americans to report on May 9 to Assembly Centers as a prelude to being removed to the internment camps, (Note: Civilian Exclusion Order No. 34) Korematsu refused and went into hiding in the Oakland area. He was arrested on a street corner in San Leandro on May 30, 1942, and held at a jail in San Francisco. Shortly after Korematsu's arrest, Ernest Besig, the director of the American Civil Liberties Union in northern California, asked him whether he would be willing to use his case to test the legality of the Japanese American internment. Korematsu agreed, and was assigned civil rights attorney Wayne M. Collins. The national ACLU argued for Besig, its own district director, not to fight Korematsu's case, as many high-ranking members of the ACLU were close to President Roosevelt and the ACLU did not want to be viewed negatively during a time of war. Besig decided to take Korematsu's case despite this.

Korematsu felt that "people should have a fair trial and a chance to defend their loyalty at court in a democratic way, because in this situation, people were placed in imprisonment without any fair trial". On June 12, 1942, Korematsu received his trial date and was given $5,000 bail (equivalent to $98,523.42 in 2025). After Korematsu's arraignment on June 18, 1942, Besig posted bail and he and Korematsu attempted to leave. When met by military police, Besig told Korematsu to go with them. The military police took Korematsu to the Presidio. Korematsu was tried and convicted in federal court on September 8, 1942, for a violation of Public Law No. 503, which criminalized the violations of military orders issued under the authority of Executive Order 9066, and was placed on five years' probation. He was taken from the courtroom and returned to the Tanforan Assembly Center, and thereafter he and his family were placed in the Central Utah War Relocation Center in Topaz, Utah. As an unskilled laborer, he was eligible to receive only $12 per month (equivalent to $236.46 in 2025) for working eight-hour days at the camp. He was placed in a horse stall with a single light bulb, and later said "jail was better than this".

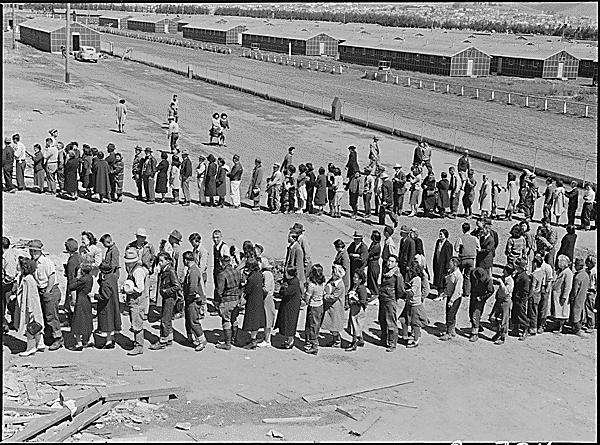
Tanforan Assembly Center, line to mess hall

Korematsu's actions were both hailed and criticized. Many Japanese residents living on the West Coast cooperated with the government internment order, hoping to prove their loyalty as Americans, including members of the Japanese American Citizens League. Korematsu was thus disdained for his opposition to a government order, and was even seen as a threat in the eyes of many Japanese Americans. When Korematsu's family was moved to the Topaz internment camp, he later recalled feeling isolated because his imprisoned compatriots recognized him and many, if not most, of them felt that if they talked to him they would also be seen as troublemakers.

Korematsu then appealed to the U.S. Court of Appeals, which granted review on March 27, 1943, but upheld the original verdict on January 7, 1944. He appealed again and brought his case to the United States Supreme Court, which granted review on March 27, 1944. On December 18, 1944, in a 6–3 decision authored by Justice Hugo Black, the Court held that compulsory exclusion, though constitutionally suspect, was justified during circumstances of "emergency and peril". (Note: See Korematsu v. United States for more information.)

However, the Court also decided Ex parte Endo in December 1944 to grant Mitsuye Endo her liberty from the camps because the Department of Justice and War Relocation Authority conceded that Endo was a "loyal and law-abiding citizen" and that no authority existed for detaining loyal citizens longer than necessary to separate the loyal from the disloyal. Endo's case did not address the question of whether the initial removal itself was constitutional, as did Korematsu's case. (Note: The U.S. Supreme Court limited its decision to the validity of the exclusion orders, adding, "The provisions of other orders requiring persons of Japanese ancestry to report to assembly centers and providing for the detention of such persons in assembly and relocation centers were separate, and their validity is not in issue in this proceeding.")

== Later adult life and compensation ==
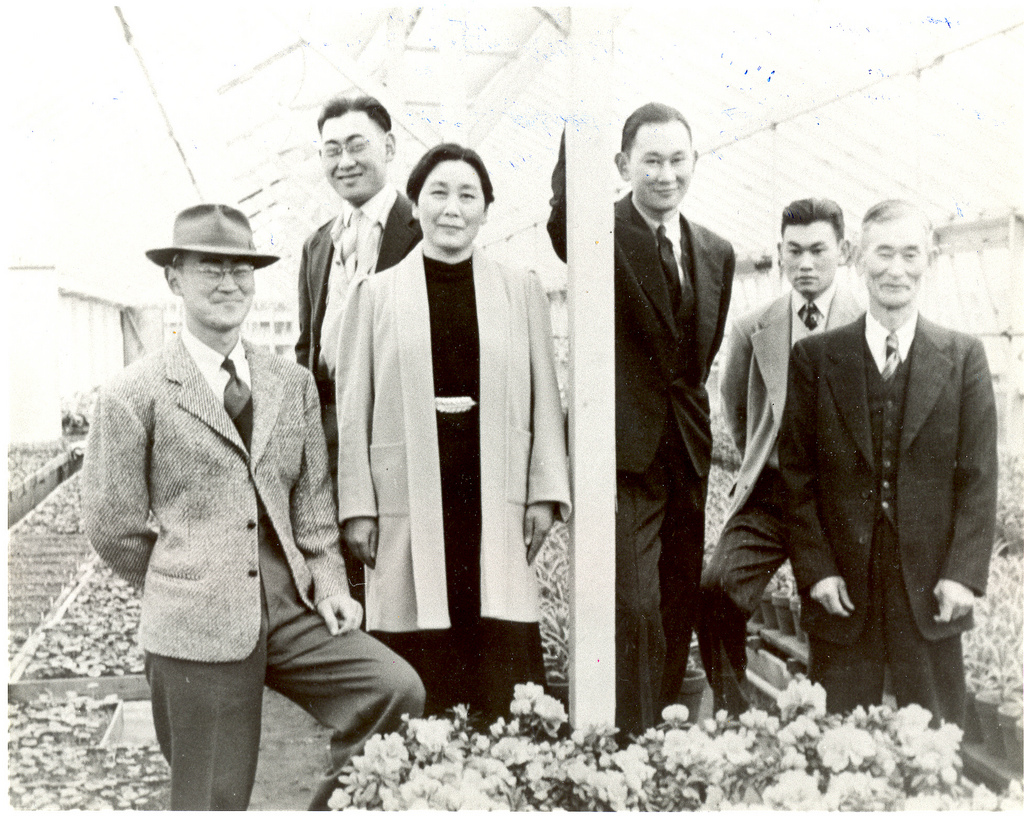
Fred Korematsu and family

After being released from the camp in Utah, Korematsu had to move east since the law would not allow former internees to move back westward. He moved to Salt Lake City, Utah, where he continued to fight racism. He still knew there were inequalities among the Japanese, since he experienced them in his everyday life. He found work repairing water tanks in Salt Lake City, but after three months on the job, he discovered he was being paid half of what his white coworkers were being paid. He told his boss that this was unfair and asked to be paid the same amount, but his boss only threatened to call the police and try to get him arrested just for being Japanese, so he left his job. After this incident, Korematsu lost hope, remaining quiet for over thirty years. His own daughter did not find out about what her father did until she was in high school. Peter Irons said that Korematsu "felt responsible for the internment in a sort of backhanded way, because his case had been lost in the Supreme Court." He moved to Detroit, Michigan, where his younger brother lived, and where he worked as a draftsman until 1949. He married Kathryn Pearson in Detroit on October 12, 1946. They returned to Oakland to visit his family in 1949 because his mother was ill. They did not intend to stay, but decided to after Kathryn became pregnant with their first child, Karen. His daughter was born in 1950, and a son, Ken, in 1954.

In 1976, President Gerald Ford signed a proclamation formally terminating Executive Order 9066 and apologizing for the internment, stated: "We now know what we should have known then—not only was that evacuation wrong but Japanese-Americans were and are loyal Americans. On the battlefield and at home the names of Japanese-Americans have been and continue to be written in history for the sacrifices and the contributions they have made to the well-being and to the security of this, our common Nation." In 1980, President Jimmy Carter appointed a special commission to investigate the internment of Japanese Americans during World War II, which concluded that the decisions to remove those of Japanese ancestry to prison camps occurred because of "race prejudice, war hysteria, and a failure of political leadership". In 1988, President Ronald Reagan signed the Civil Liberties Act of 1988 which had been sponsored by Representative Norman Mineta and Senator Alan K. Simpson. It provided financial redress of $20,000 for each surviving detainee, totaling $1.2 billion.

In the early 1980s, while researching a book on internment cases, lawyer and University of California, San Diego professor Peter Irons came across evidence that Charles Fahy, the Solicitor General of the United States who argued Korematsu v. United States before the Supreme Court, had deliberately suppressed reports from the Federal Bureau of Investigation and military intelligence which concluded that Japanese-American citizens posed no security risk. These documents revealed that the military had lied to the Supreme Court and that government lawyers had willingly made false arguments. Irons concluded that the Supreme Court's decision was invalid since it was based on unsubstantiated assertions, distortions and misrepresentations. Along with a team of lawyers headed by Dale Minami, Irons petitioned for writs of error coram nobis with the federal courts, seeking to overturn Korematsu's conviction.

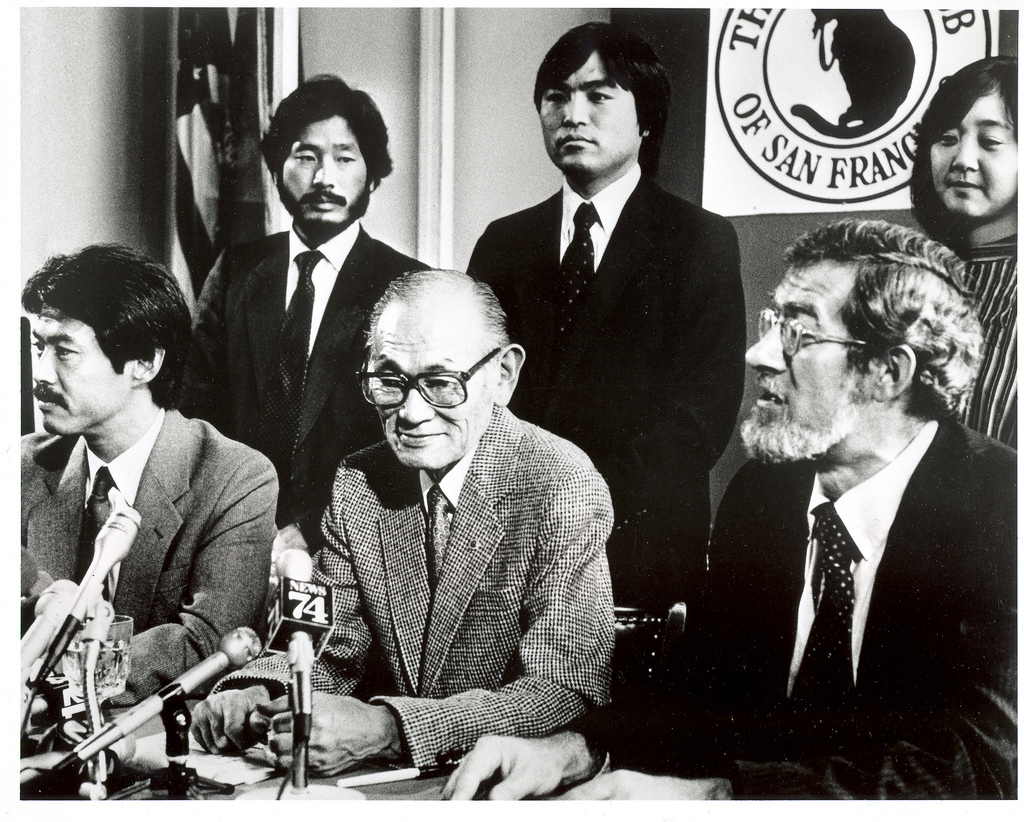
Korematsu at a press conference regarding the coram nobis petitioned for with the federal courts

On November 10, 1983, Judge Marilyn Hall Patel of U.S. District Court in San Francisco formally vacated the conviction. Korematsu testified before Judge Patel, "I would like to see the government admit that they were wrong and do something about it so this will never happen again to any American citizen of any race, creed, or color." He also said, "If anyone should do any pardoning, I should be the one pardoning the government for what they did to the Japanese-American people." Irons described Korematsu's ending statement during the case as the most powerful statement he had ever heard from anyone. He found the statement as empowering as Martin Luther King Jr.'s 1963 "I Have a Dream" speech. Judge Patel's ruling cleared Korematsu's name, but was incapable of overturning the Supreme Court's decision.

President Bill Clinton awarded the Presidential Medal of Freedom, the highest civilian honor in the United States, to Korematsu in 1998, saying, "In the long history of our country's constant search for justice, some names of ordinary citizens stand for millions of souls: Plessy, Brown, Parks ... to that distinguished list, today we add the name of Fred Korematsu." That year, Korematsu served as the grand marshal of San Francisco's annual Cherry Blossom Festival parade.

A member and Elder of the First Presbyterian Church of Oakland, Korematsu was twice President of the San Leandro Lions Club, and for 15 years a volunteer with Boy Scouts of America, San Francisco Bay Council. In 1988, the Alameda County Bar Association presented Korematsu with the American Bar Association Liberty Bell Award.

Korematsu spoke out after September 11, 2001, on how the United States government should not let the same thing happen to people of Middle Eastern descent as what happened to Japanese Americans. When prisoners were detained at Guantanamo Bay for too long a period, in Korematsu's opinion, he filed two amicus curiae briefs with the Supreme Court and warned them not to repeat the mistakes of the Japanese internment.

He wrote the first of these amicus briefs in October 2003 for two cases appealed before the Supreme Court of the United States, Shafiq Rasul v. George W. Bush and Khaled A. F. Al Odah v. United States of America. Attorneys Arturo J. Gonzalez and Sylvia M. Sokol of Morrison & Foerster LLP, and Jon B. Streeter and Eumi K. Lee of Keker & Van Nest LLP, worked on the amicus curiae brief. In the brief, Korematsu warned the Supreme Court that the restriction of civil liberties can never be justified, and had never been justified in the history of the United States. Furthermore, Korematsu provided examples of specific cases in American history in which the government exceeded constitutional authority, including the Alien and Sedition Acts of 1798 and the Japanese internment of World War II. Korematsu thus reacted critically to the administration of President George W. Bush, who imprisoned detainees in Guantanamo Bay by restricting their civil liberties albeit in a time of, according to the respondent, "military necessity".

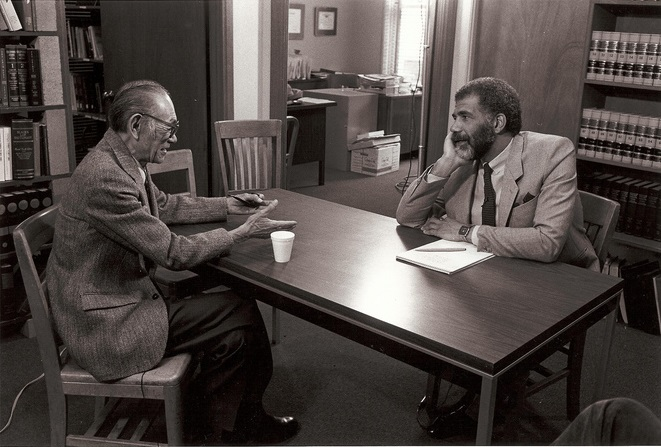
Korematsu during interview with 60 Minutes

Similarly, in his second amicus brief, written in April 2004 with the Bar Association of San Francisco, the Asian Law Caucus, the Asian American Bar Association of the Greater Bay Area, Asian Pacific Islander Legal Outreach and the Japanese American Citizens League, Korematsu responded to Donald Rumsfeld v. Jose Padilla. The following attorneys worked on the amicus brief: Geoffrey R. Stone and Dale Minami of Minami, Lew, and Tamaki LLP; Eric K. Yamamoto, Stephen J. Schulhofer of the Brennan Center for Justice; and Evan R. Chesler of Cravath, Swaine & Moore LLP. The amici curiae's statement of interest emphasized the similarity of the unlawful detainment of Fred Korematsu during World War II and that of Jose Padilla following the events of 9/11, and warned the American government of repeating mistakes of the past. He believed that "full vindication for the Japanese-Americans will arrive only when we learn that, even in times of crisis, we must guard against prejudice and keep uppermost our commitment to law and justice."

From 2001 until his death, Korematsu served on the Constitution Project's bipartisan Liberty and Security Committee. Discussing racial profiling in 2004, he warned, "No one should ever be locked away simply because they share the same race, ethnicity, or religion as a spy or terrorist. If that principle was not learned from the internment of Japanese Americans, then these are very dangerous times for our democracy."

== Death ==
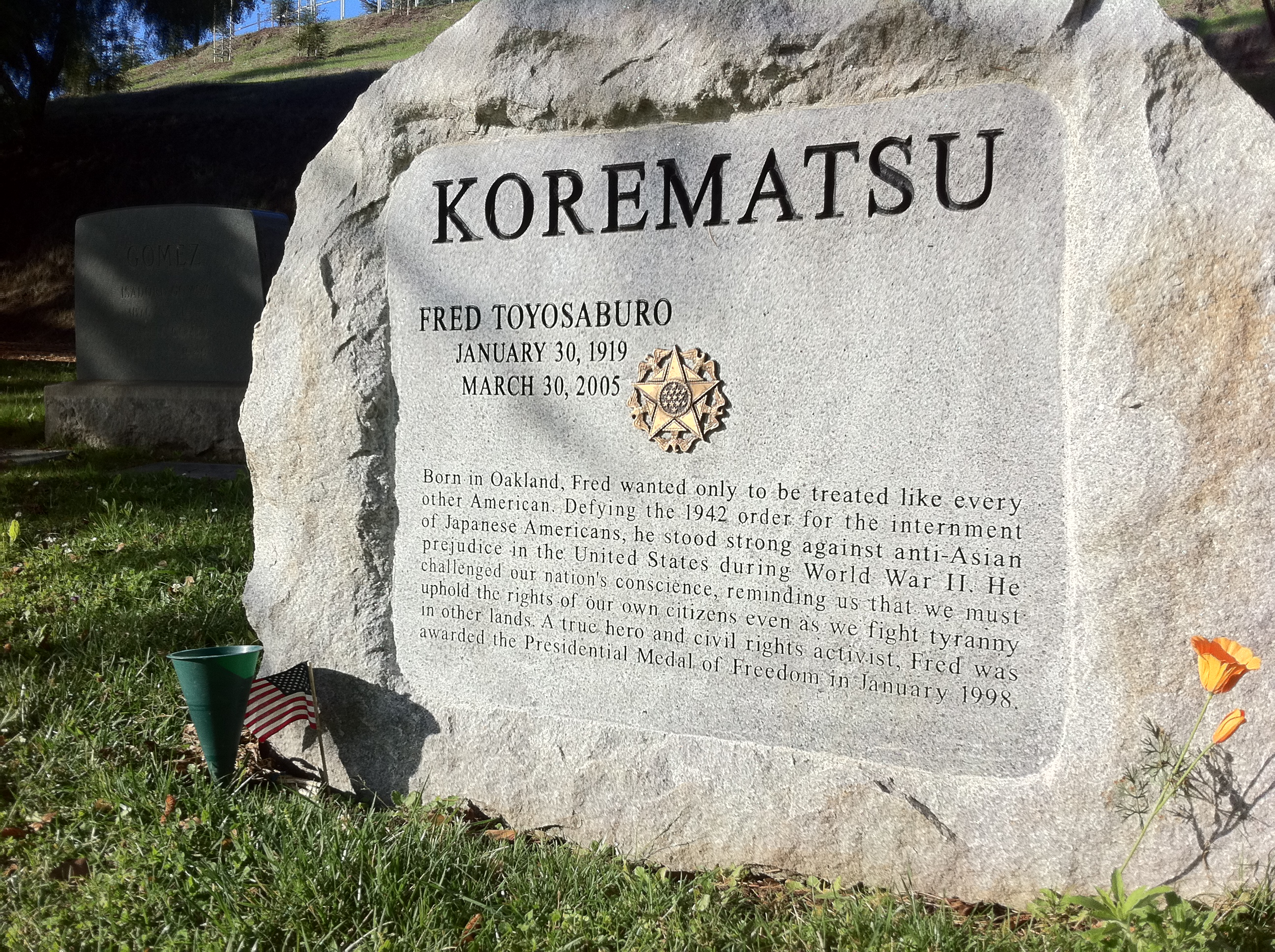
Fred Korematsu's grave at the Mountain View Cemetery in Oakland, California; an enlarged replica of the Presidential Medal of Freedom is displayed on his tombstone.

Fred Korematsu died of respiratory failure at his daughter's home in Marin County, California, on March 30, 2005. One of the last things Korematsu said was, "I'll never forget my government treating me like this. And I really hope that this will never happen to anybody else because of the way they look, if they look like the enemy of our country." He also urged others to "protest, but not with violence, and don’t be afraid to speak up. One person can make a difference, even if it takes forty years." Korematsu was buried at the Mountain View Cemetery.

== Legacy ==
The Fred T. Korematsu Institute carries Korematsu's name to continue his work with teachers and community leaders across the country to promote Korematsu's fight for justice and civil liberties.

The Fred T. Korematsu Center for Law and Equality at the University of California, Irvine School of Law honors Korematsu's legacy through "research, advocacy and education initiatives that promote racial equity and social justice" and houses The Defender Initiative and the Homeless Rights Advocacy Project.

On May 24, 2011, U.S. Acting Solicitor General Neal Katyal delivered the keynote speech at the Department of Justice's Great Hall marking Asian American and Pacific Islander Heritage Month. Developing comments he had posted officially on May 20, Katyal issued the Justice Department's first public confession of its 1942 ethics lapse. He cited the Korematsu case and the similar precedent of Gordon Hirabayashi as blots on the reputation of the Office of the Solicitor General, which aspires to deserve "special credence" when pleading cases before the Supreme Court, and thus "an important reminder" of the need for absolute candor in arguing the United States government's position on every case.

In 2018, in Trump v. Hawaii, the Supreme Court expressly declared that Korematsu's case was wrongly decided and "morally repugnant", but did not formally overrule it.

Other dedications and honors include the following:

- Fred T. Korematsu Elementary School at Mace Ranch in Davis, California, is named for Korematsu.
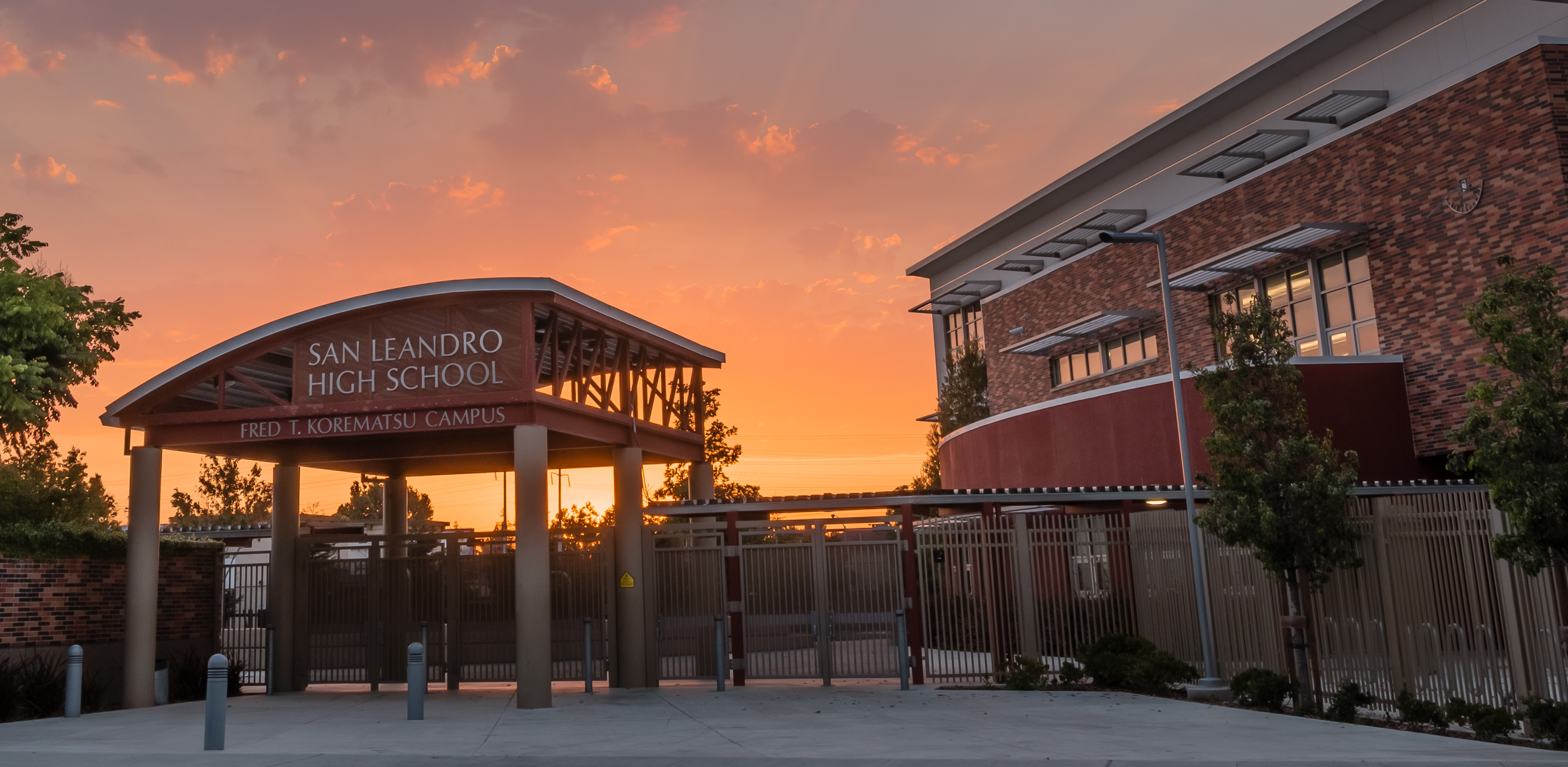
  Exterior of the San Leandro High School Fred T. Korematsu Campus
- The auxiliary campus at San Leandro High School is named the Fred T. Korematsu Campus in honor of Korematsu.
- The Discovery Academy elementary school in Oakland, California, was renamed Fred T. Korematsu Discovery Academy.
- Portola Middle School was renamed The Fred T Korematsu Middle School in El Cerrito, California, at the new campus location formerly Castro Elementary School site.
- In 1988, a street in San Jose, California was renamed Korematsu Court. (Note: The street is located at 37.220935°N 121.880976°W.)
- There is a Korematsu bronze relief in front of the San Jose Federal Building.
- Awards in his name include the Alameda County Bar Association's ABA Liberty Bell Award and the American Muslim Voices Korematsu Civil Rights Award.
- On September 23, 2010, Governor Arnold Schwarzenegger of California signed into law a bill that designates January 30 of each year as the Fred Korematsu Day of Civil Liberties and the Constitution, a first for an Asian American in the United States. It was observed for the first time on January 30, 2011. The main celebration of the California state was held at the Wheeler Auditorium on the University of California, Berkeley campus, sponsored by the Korematsu Institute, a non-profit program co-founded by Korematsu's daughter Karen Korematsu to advance racial equity, social justice, and human rights as well as the Asian Law Caucus, a San Francisco-based civil rights organization. The event included presentations by the Rev. Jesse Jackson and a screening of the Emmy Award-winning film Of Civil Wrongs and Rights: The Fred Korematsu Story.
- In 2015, the Commonwealth of Virginia established January 30 as "Fred Korematsu Day of Civil Liberties and the Constitution" beginning in 2016.
- Since 2010, Hawaii, Utah, Georgia, Illinois, Pennsylvania, South Carolina, Michigan and Florida have all commemorated "Fred Korematsu Day of Civil Liberties and the Constitution".
- Korematsu was the first Asian American featured in "The Struggle for Justice", a permanent exhibition at the Smithsonian's National Portrait Gallery.
- On January 30, 2017, to commemorate what would have been his 98th birthday, Korematsu was honored with a front-page Google Doodle.
- On December 19, 2017, the New York City Council unanimously passed a resolution establishing January 30 annually as Fred T. Korematsu Day of Civil Liberties and the Constitution. The resolution's main sponsor was Council Member Daniel Dromm of Queens.
- On October 27, 2021, Korematsu posthumously received the Freedom Medal from the Roosevelt Institute.

== See also ==
- Day of Remembrance (Japanese Americans)
- Japanese American redress and court cases
- List of civil rights leaders
- List of Presidential Medal of Freedom recipients
- Minoru Yasui
- Movements for civil rights in the United States
