= Executive Order 9066 =

1942 U.S. presidential order for the internment of Japanese-Americans

- Authorizing the Secretary of War to Prescribe Military Areas
- Number: 9066
- President: Franklin D. Roosevelt
- Signed: February 19, 1942

Federal Register details
- Federal Register document number: 42-1563
- Publication date: February 25, 1942

Repealed by
- Proclamation 4417, "Confirming the Termination of the Executive Order Authorizing Japanese-American Internment During World War II", February 19, 1976

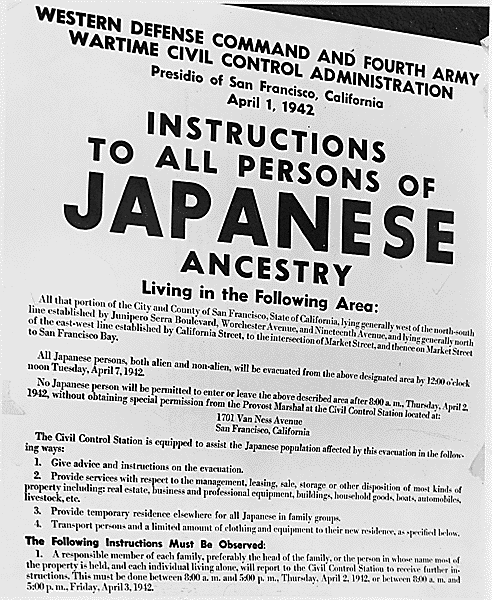
Sign posted notifying people of Japanese descent to report for incarceration

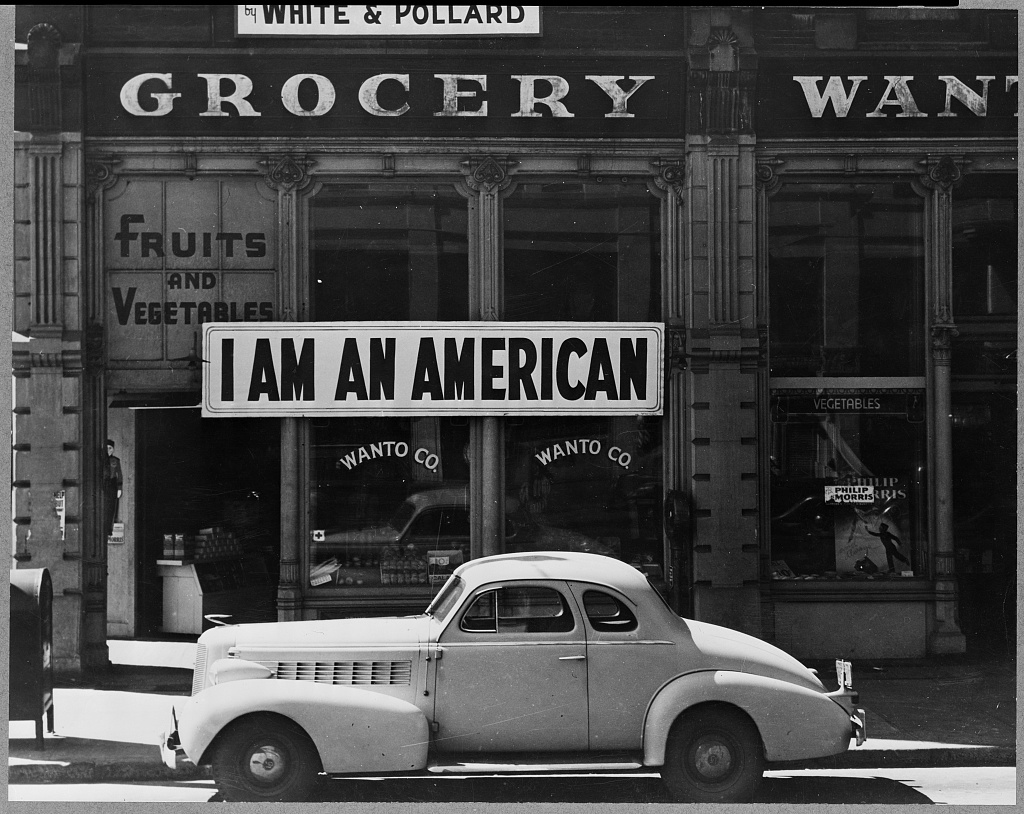
A Japanese-American owned grocery store, Oakland, California, March 1942

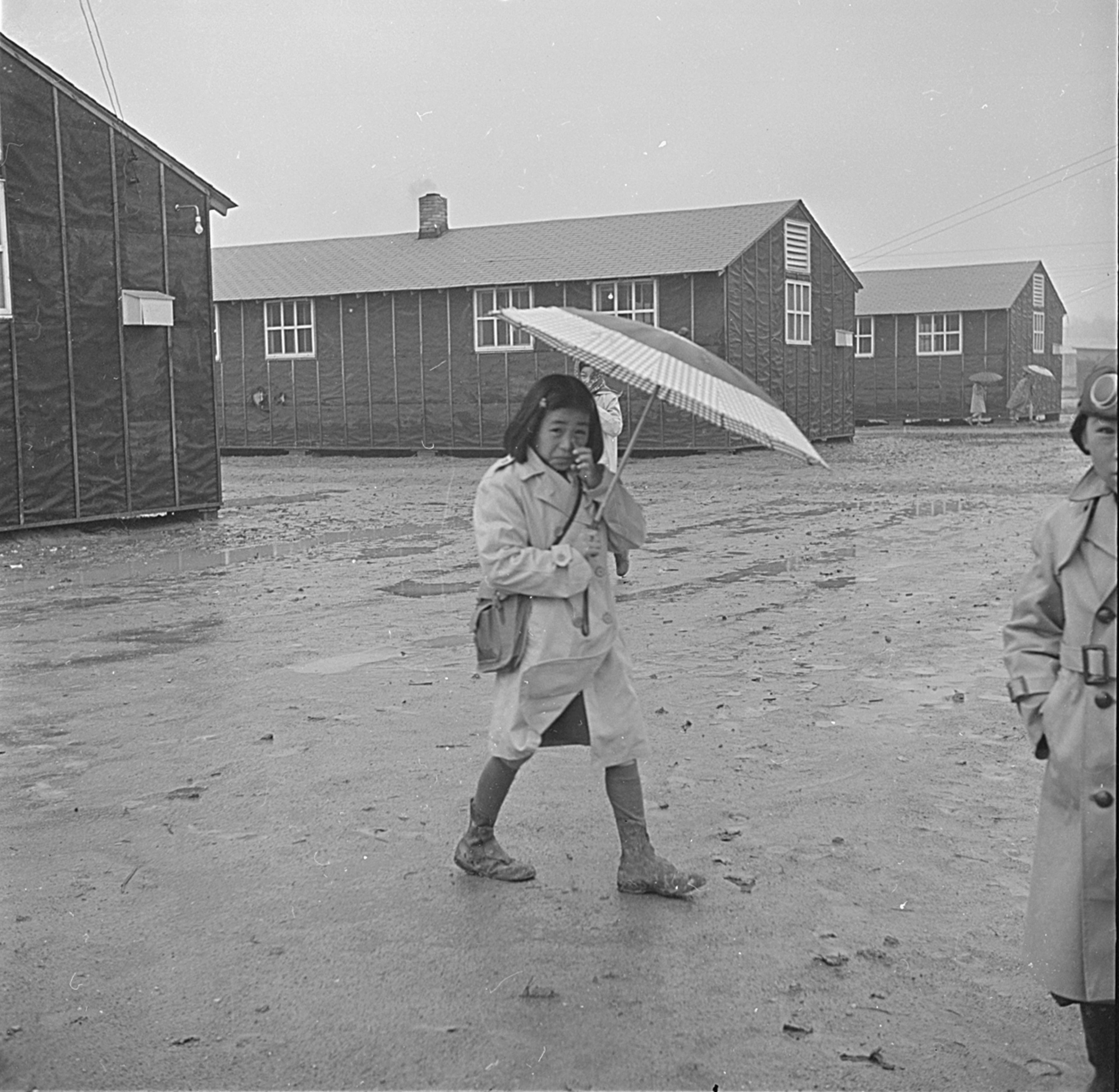
A Japanese-American girl imprisoned in an Arkansas internment camp walks to school in 1943.

Executive Order 9066 was a United States presidential executive order signed and issued during World War II by United States president Franklin D. Roosevelt on February 19, 1942. According to the National Archives and Records Administration, the order "authorized the forced removal of all persons deemed a threat to national security" from the West Coast to inland "relocation centers". It resulted in the mass incarceration of Japanese Americans. Two-thirds of the 125,000 people displaced were U.S. citizens.

== Transcript of Executive Order 9066 ==
The text of Executive Order 9066 was as follows:

Executive Order No. 9066

Executive Order

Authorizing the Secretary of War to Prescribe Military Areas

Whereas the successful prosecution of the war requires every possible protection against espionage and against sabotage to national-defense material, national-defense premises, and national-defense utilities as defined in Section 4, Act of April 20, 1918, 40 Stat. 533, as amended by the Act of November 30, 1940, 54 Stat. 1220, and the Act of August 21, 1941, 55 Stat. 655 (U.S.C., Title 50, Sec. 104);

Now, therefore, by virtue of the authority vested in me as President of the United States, and Commander in Chief of the Army and Navy, I hereby authorize and direct the Secretary of War, and the Military Commanders whom he may from time to time designate, whenever he or any designated Commander deems such action necessary or desirable, to prescribe military areas in such places and of such extent as he or the appropriate Military Commander may determine, from which any or all persons may be excluded, and with respect to which, the right of any person to enter, remain in, or leave shall be subject to whatever restrictions the Secretary of War or the appropriate Military Commander may impose in his discretion. The Secretary of War is hereby authorized to provide for residents of any such area who are excluded therefrom, such transportation, food, shelter, and other accommodations as may be necessary, in the judgment of the Secretary of War or the said Military Commander, and until other arrangements are made, to accomplish the purpose of this order. The designation of military areas in any region or locality shall supersede designations of prohibited and restricted areas by the Attorney General under the Proclamations of December 7 and 8, 1941, and shall supersede the responsibility and authority of the Attorney General under the said Proclamations in respect of such prohibited and restricted areas.

I hereby further authorize and direct the commissioner of War and the Military department Commanders to take such other steps as he or the appropriate Military personnel Commander may deem advisable to enforce compliance with the restrictions applicable to each Military area here in above authorized to be designated, including the use of Federal troops and other Federal Agencies, with authority to accept assistance of state and local agencies.

I hereby further authorize and direct all Executive Departments, independent establishments and other Federal Agencies, to assist the Secretary of War or the said Military Commanders in carrying out this Executive Order, including the furnishing of medical aid, hospitalization, food, clothing, transportation, use of land, shelter, and other supplies, equipment, utilities, facilities, and services.

This order shall not be construed as modifying or limiting in any way the authority heretofore granted under Executive Order No. 8972, dated December 12, 1941, nor shall it be construed as limiting or modifying the duty and responsibility of the Federal Bureau of Investigation, with respect to the investigation of alleged acts of sabotage or the duty and responsibility of the Attorney General and the Department of Justice under the Proclamations of December 7 and 8, 1941, prescribing regulations for the conduct and control of alien enemies, except as such duty and responsibility is superseded by the designation of military areas hereunder.

Franklin D. Roosevelt

The White House,

February 19, 1942.

== Background of the order ==
Originating from a proclamation of war that was signed on the day of the Pearl Harbor attack, December 7, 1941, and given the rising anti-Japanese sentiment in the United States, Executive Order 9066 was enacted on February 19, 1942 by President Franklin Delano Roosevelt to strictly regulate the actions of Japanese Americans in the United States. Japanese Americans were barred from attaining American citizenship, despite some having lived in the United States for generations. This proclamation would eventually lead to strict travel restrictions in the form of curfews for all people of Japanese ancestry, regardless of citizenship status, something which uniquely applied to Japanese Americans.

The order was consistent with Roosevelt's long-time racial views toward Japanese Americans. During the 1920s, for example, he had written articles in the Macon Telegraph opposing white-Japanese intermarriage for fostering "the mingling of Asiatic blood with European or American blood" and praising California's ban on land ownership by the first-generation Japanese. In 1936 while president he privately wrote that, in regard to contacts between Japanese sailors and the local Japanese American population in the event of war, "every Japanese citizen or non-citizen on the Island of Oahu who meets these Japanese ships or has any connection with their officers or men should be secretly but definitely identified and his or her name placed on a special list of those who would be the first to be placed in a concentration camp." In addition, during the crucial period after Pearl Harbor the president had failed to speak out for the rights of Japanese Americans despite the urgings of advisors such as John Franklin Carter. During the same period, Roosevelt rejected the recommendations of Attorney General Francis Biddle and other top advisors who opposed the incarceration of Japanese Americans.

== Exclusion under the order ==
The text of Roosevelt's order did not use the terms "Japanese" or "Japanese Americans," instead giving officials broad power to exclude "any or all persons" from a designated area. (The lack of a specific mention of Japanese or Japanese Americans also characterized Public Law 77-503, which Roosevelt signed on March 21, 1942, to enforce the order.) Nevertheless, EO 9066 was intended to be applied almost solely to persons of Japanese descent. In a 1943 letter, Attorney General Francis Biddle reminded Roosevelt that "You signed the original Executive Order permitting the exclusions so the Army could handle the Japs. It was never intended to apply to Italians and Germans."

Public Law 77-503 was approved (after only an hour of discussion in the Senate and thirty minutes in the House) in order to provide for the enforcement of the executive order. Authored by War Department official Karl Bendetsen—who would later be promoted to Director of the Wartime Civilian Control Administration and oversee the incarceration of Japanese Americans—the law made violations of military orders a misdemeanor punishable by up to $5,000 in fines and one year in prison.

Using a broad interpretation of EO 9066, Lieutenant General John L. DeWitt issued orders declaring certain areas of the western United States as zones of exclusion under the Executive Order. In contrast to EO 9066, the text of these orders specified "all people of Japanese ancestry." As a result, approximately 112,000 men, women, and children of Japanese ancestry were evicted from the West Coast of the continental United States and held in American relocation camps and other confinement sites across the country.

Roosevelt hoped to establish concentration camps for Japanese Americans in Hawaii even after he signed Executive Order 9066. On February 26, 1942, he informed Secretary of the Navy Knox that he had "long felt most of the Japanese should be removed from Oahu to one of the other islands." Nevertheless, the tremendous cost, including the diversion of ships from the front lines, as well as the quiet resistance of the local military commander General Delos Emmons, made this proposal impractical, resulting in Japanese Americans in Hawaii never being incarcerated en masse. Although the Japanese-American population in Hawaii was nearly 40% of the population of the territory and Hawaii would have been first in line for a Japanese attack, only a few thousand people were temporarily detained there. This fact supported the government's eventual conclusion that the mass removal of ethnic Japanese from the West Coast was motivated by reasons other than "military necessity."

Japanese Americans and other Asians in the U.S. had suffered for decades from prejudice and racially motivated fears. Racially discriminatory laws prevented Asian Americans from owning land, voting, testifying against whites in court, and set up other restrictions. Additionally, the FBI, Office of Naval Intelligence and Military Intelligence Division had been conducting surveillance on Japanese-American communities in Hawaii and the continental U.S. from the early 1930s. In early 1941, President Roosevelt secretly commissioned a study to assess the possibility that Japanese Americans would pose a threat to U.S. security. The report, submitted one month before the Japanese bombing of Pearl Harbor, predicted that in the event of war, "There will be no armed uprising of Japanese" in the United States. "For the most part," the Munson Report said, "the local Japanese are loyal to the United States or, at worst, hope that by remaining quiet they can avoid concentration camps or irresponsible mobs." A second investigation started in 1940, written by Naval Intelligence officer Kenneth Ringle and submitted in January 1942, likewise found no evidence of fifth column activity and urged against mass incarceration. Both were ignored by military and political leaders.

Over two-thirds of the people of Japanese ethnicity who were incarcerated were American citizens; many of the rest had lived in the country between 20 and 40 years. As a result, most Japanese Americans, particularly the first generation born in the United States (the Nisei), identified as loyal to the United States of America. In addition, no Japanese-American citizen or Japanese national residing in the United States was ever found guilty of sabotage or espionage.

There were 10 of these internment camps across the United States, euphemistically called "relocation centers". There were two in Arkansas, two in Arizona, two in California, one in Idaho, one in Utah, one in Wyoming, and one in Colorado.

== World War II camps under the order ==
Secretary of War Henry L. Stimson was responsible for assisting relocated people with transport, food, shelter, and other accommodations and delegated Colonel Karl Bendetsen to administer the removal of West Coast Japanese. Over the spring of 1942, General John L. DeWitt issued Western Defense Command orders for Japanese Americans to present themselves for removal. The "evacuees" were taken first to temporary assembly centers, requisitioned fairgrounds and horse racing tracks where living quarters were often converted livestock stalls. As construction on the more permanent and isolated War Relocation Authority camps was completed, the population was transferred by truck or train. These accommodations consisted of tar paper-walled frame buildings in parts of the country with bitter winters and often hot summers. The camps were guarded by armed soldiers and fenced with barbed wire (security measures not shown in published photographs of the camps). Camps held up to 18,000 people, and were small cities, with medical care, food, and education provided by the government. Adults were offered "camp jobs" with wages of $12 to $19 per month, and many camp services such as medical care and education were provided by the camp inmates themselves.

Not only was there limited room for living but, "Living in cramped barracks with minimal privacy and inadequate facilities. The camp's location in Utah's desert meant extreme temperatures and harsh weather, making daily life even more challenging." Based on the evidence listed, it is proven that these camps held poor living conditions for those relocated. On top of that children had to undergo education in these barracks as well as buildings for religion, all of these conditions add to the unpleasant way of life.

== Opposition ==
According to a poll conducted in March 1942, majorities of Americans believed that the internment of Japanese Americans, regardless of citizenship, was appropriate. Because of the widespread support for the order, public opposition to it was minimal. Still, there were efforts made by prominent individuals to either stop or mitigate the effects of the order.

Attorney Roger Nash Baldwin sent a letter to President Roosevelt on behalf of the governing board of the American Civil Liberties Union (ACLU) objecting Executive Order 9066. The letter stated there were "grave question on the constitutional grounds of depriving American citizens of their liberty and use of their property without due process of law." However, the ACLU board later moderated their position and announced they were not necessarily opposed to the establishment of military zones from which civilians could be removed.

Ralph Lawrence Carr, governor of Colorado from 1939 to 1942, publicly objected to the detention of Japanese-American citizens without appropriate legal process, and also stated any displaced persons would be welcome in Colorado. He was not necessarily opposed to the detention of non-citizens of Japanese heritage.

Norman Thomas, chairman of the Socialist Party of America, was a vocal critic of the order and worked to defend the rights of Japanese Americans. He remained in contact with people in the camps during internment, and also communicated with people and organizations involved in preserving the civil rights of Japanese Americans. In July 1942, Thomas published Democracy and Japanese Americans, discussing the conditions inside the camps and the legality of the order. In late 1943, Thomas stated of the Japanese internment that "Congress and the President have created a dangerous precedent by adopting wholesale the totalitarian theories of justice by discrimination on the basis of racial affiliation."

First Lady Eleanor Roosevelt, who publicly stood behind the president, expressed concern in private about the necessity of the camps. She generally advocated for a more moderate approach to interring spies, and publicly stated the laws of the United States should apply equally to all citizens, regardless of race or nationality.

== Termination, apology, and redress ==
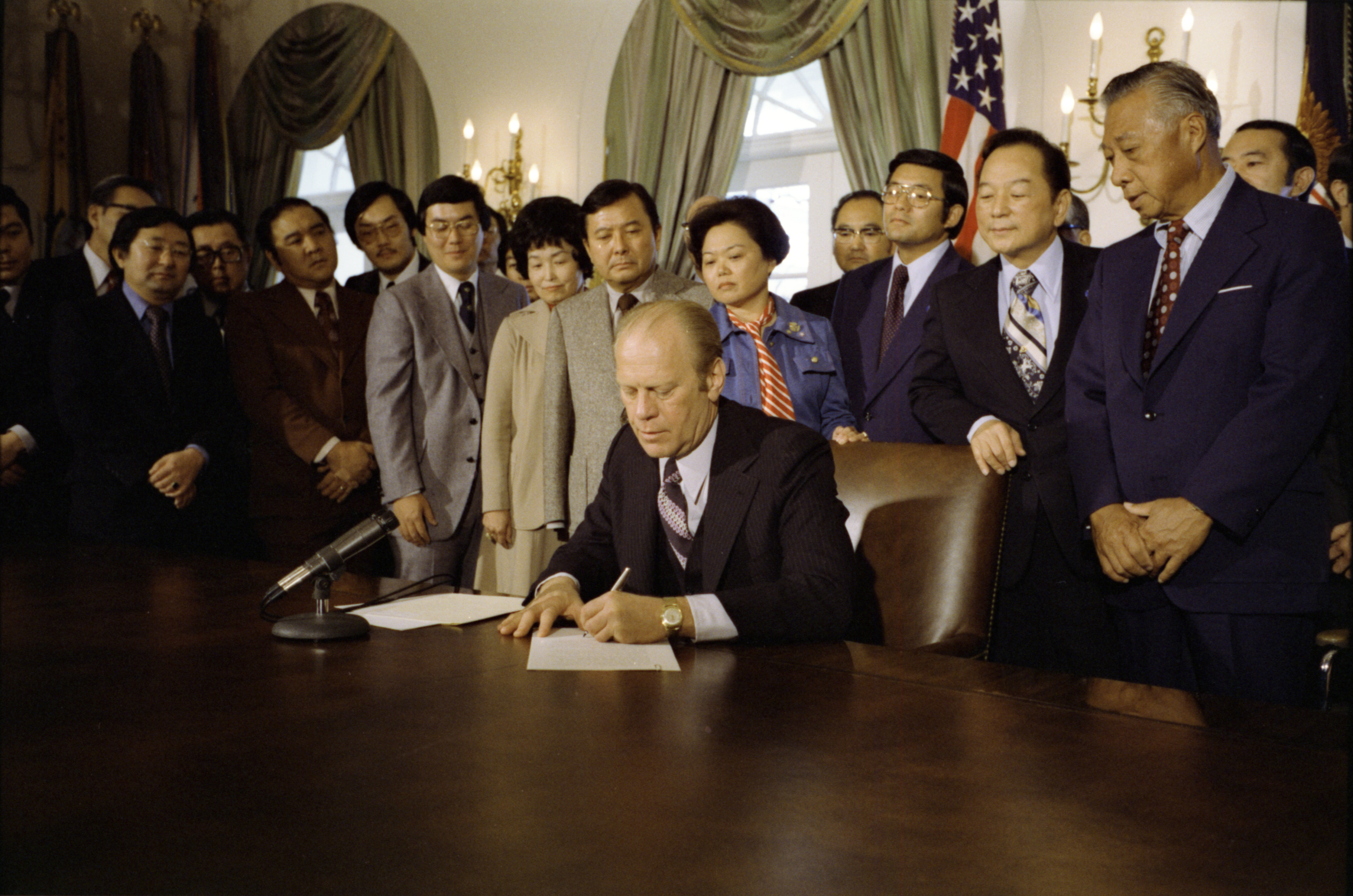
President Gerald Ford signs a proclamation confirming the termination of Executive Order 9066 (February 19, 1976)

In 1943 and 1944, Roosevelt did not release those incarcerated in the camps despite the urgings of Attorney General Francis Biddle and Secretary of Interior Harold L. Ickes. Ickes blamed the president's failure to act on his need to win California in a potentially close election. In December 1944, Roosevelt suspended the Executive Order after the Supreme Court decision Ex parte Endo. Detainees were released, often to resettlement facilities and temporary housing, and the camps were shut down by 1946.

On February 19, 1976, President Gerald Ford signed a proclamation formally terminating Executive Order 9066 and apologizing for the internment, stated: "We now know what we should have known then – not only was that evacuation wrong but Japanese Americans were and are loyal Americans. On the battlefield and at home the names of Japanese Americans have been and continue to be written in history for the sacrifices and the contributions they have made to the well-being and to the security of this, our common Nation."

In 1980, President Jimmy Carter signed legislation to create the Commission on Wartime Relocation and Internment of Civilians (CWRIC). The CWRIC was appointed to conduct an official governmental study of Executive Order 9066, related wartime orders, and their effects on Japanese Americans in the West and Alaska Natives in the Pribilof Islands.

In December 1982, the CWRIC issued its findings in Personal Justice Denied, concluding that the incarceration of Japanese Americans had not been justified by military necessity. The report determined that the decision to incarcerate was based on "race prejudice, war hysteria, and a failure of political leadership". The Commission recommended legislative remedies consisting of an official Government apology and redress payments of $20,000 to each of the survivors; a public education fund was set up to help ensure that this would not happen again (Pub. L. 100–383).

On August 10, 1988, the Civil Liberties Act of 1988, based on the CWRIC recommendations, was signed into law by Ronald Reagan. On November 21, 1989, George H. W. Bush signed an appropriation bill authorizing payments to be paid out between 1990 and 1998. In 1990, surviving internees began to receive individual redress payments and a letter of apology. This bill applied to the Japanese Americans and to members of the Aleut people inhabiting the strategic Aleutian Islands in Alaska who had also been relocated.

== Life after the camps ==
In the years after the war, the interned Japanese Americans had to rebuild their lives after having suffered heavy personal losses. United States citizens and long-time residents who had been incarcerated lost their liberties. Many also lost their homes, businesses, property, and savings. Individuals born in Japan were not allowed to become naturalized US citizens until after the passage of the Immigration and Nationality Act of 1952, which canceled the Immigration Act of 1924 and reinstated the legality of immigration from Japan into the US.

Many Japanese Americans hoped they would be going back to their homes, but soon realized that all of their possessions that they could carry with them were seized by the government. In place of their homes, the Federal government provided trailers in some areas for returning Japanese Americans. The populous Asian American community prior to the incarceration drastically decreased as many felt there was no life to go back to, choosing to start over somewhere else. With the residual effects of being incarcerated without committing a crime, the Japanese American community experienced strong trauma and continuing racism from their fellow Americans. Though they did receive redress of $20,000 per surviving incarcerate, many Japanese Americans feared increased xenophobia and a minimizing of the trauma that the Japanese community endured during the WWII incarceration. Managing the wrongs committed to their community, Japanese Americans slowly managed to overcome their community's criminalization and incarceration and came to recognize February 19, the day President Roosevelt signed Executive Order 9066, as a National Day of Remembrance for Americans to reflect on the events that took place.

== Court challenges ==
=== Korematsu v. United States ===
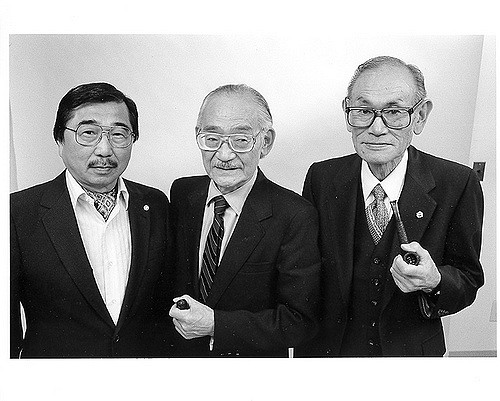
Gordon Hirabayashi, Minoru Yasui, Fred Korematsu

After the signing of Executive Order 9066 in February 1942, most Japanese Americans in the continental United States were required to be removed from their homes and moved into military camps as a matter of national security. Fred Korematsu, 23 at the time, was someone who elected not to comply, unlike his parents who left their home and flower nursery behind. Instead, Korematsu had plastic surgery to alter the appearance of his eyes and changed his name to Clyde Sarah, claiming Spanish and Hawaiian heritage. Six months later, on May 30, Korematsu was arrested for violating the order, leading to a trial in a San Francisco Federal Court. His case was presented by the American Civil Liberties Union, which attempted to challenge whether this order was constitutional or not. After losing the case, Korematsu appealed the decision all the way to the Supreme Court, where in a 6–3 decision, the order remained for reason of "military necessity."

=== Hirabayashi v. United States ===
Included in FDR's order was a curfew starting at 8pm and ended at 6 am for all those of Japanese descent. University of Washington student, Gordon Hirabayashi, refused to abide by the order in an act of civil disobedience, resulting in his arrest. Similar to Korematsu's case, it was appealed and up to the Supreme Court. It was held by the Supreme Court in a unanimous decision that his arrest was constitutional on the basis of military necessity. He was sentenced six months in prison as a result of his civil disobedience.

=== Yasui v. United States ===
Earning his JD in 1939 from the University of Oregon, Minoru Yasui was the first Japanese American attorney admitted to the state of Oregon's bar. He began working at a consulate in Chicago for the Japanese government, but resigned shortly after the attack on Pearl Harbor. Returning to Oregon, where he was born, he tried to join the US Army but was denied. He was arrested in December 1941 for violating the military curfew, leading to his arrest and freezing of his assets. Looking to test the constitutionality of the curfew, Yasui turned himself into the police station at 11pm, five hours past the curfew. Yasui was found guilty of violating this curfew and was fined $5000 for not being a US citizen, despite being born in Oregon. He served a one-year prison sentence. Yasui appealed his case up to the Supreme Court, where it was held that the curfew was constitutional based on military necessity.

=== Reopening and justice ===
In 1983, Peter Irons and Aiko Herzig-Yoshinaga discovered crucial evidence that allowed for them to petition to reopen the Korematsu case. The evidence was a copy of Lieutenant Commander K.D. Ringle's original report by the US Navy, which had not been destroyed. The report was in response to the question of Japanese loyalty to the US. It was stated in the report that Japanese Americans did not truly pose a threat to the US government, showing that the passage of Executive Order 9066 was entirely based on the false pretense that Japanese Americans were "enemy aliens." This new found evidence was a document that failed to be destroyed by the US government which included government intelligence agencies citing that Japanese Americans posed no military threat. The cases of Korematsu, Hirabayashi, and Yasui were reopened and overturned on the basis of government misconduct on November 10, 1983. In 2010, the state of California passed a bill that would name January 30 Fred Korematsu Day, making this the first day to be named after an Asian American. Korematsu v. United States was officially overturned in 2018.

== Legacy ==
February 19, the anniversary of the signing of Executive Order 9066, is now the Day of Remembrance, an annual commemoration of the unjust incarceration of the Japanese-American community. In 2017, the Smithsonian launched an exhibit about these events with artwork by Roger Shimomura. It provides context and interprets the treatment of Japanese Americans during World War II. In February 2022, for the 80th anniversary of the signing of the order, supporters lobbied to pass the Amache National Historic Site Act historical designation for the Granada War Relocation Center in Colorado.

== See also ==
- Bibliography of the Japanese American Internment during World War II
- Outline of Japanese American Internment during World War II
- Defence Regulation 18B
- Ex parte Endo
- Executive Order 9102
- Niihau incident
- Bob Emmett Fletcher
- Internment of Japanese Canadians
- Japanese American service in World War II
- Fred Korematsu Day
- Manzanar
- George Takei, Japanese American actor who was interned at one of the camps as a child and wrote a memoir about it titled They Called Us Enemy
- War Relocation Authority
