= Mitsuye Endo =

Japanese American Woman involved in Ex parte Mitsuye Endo case

- Born: May 10, 1920; Sacramento, California, U.S.
- Died: April 14, 2006 (aged 85); Chicago, Illinois, U.S.
- Known for: Ex parte Endo
- Awards: Presidential Citizens Medal

Mitsuye Endo Tsutsumi (Japanese: 遠藤 美津江, May 10, 1920 – April 14, 2006) was an American woman of Japanese descent who was unjustly incarcerated during World War II in concentration camps sponsored by the War Relocation Authority. Endo filed a writ of habeas corpus that ultimately led to a United States Supreme Court ruling that the U.S. government could not continue to detain a citizen who was "concededly loyal" to the United States.

On January 2, 2025, she was awarded the Presidential Citizens Medal for her role in the case challenging the mass incarceration of Japanese Americans in concentration camps.

== Early life ==
Mitsuye Endo was born on May 10, 1920, in Sacramento, the second of four children of Jinshiro and Shima (Ota) Endo, Japanese immigrants. Her father worked as a fishmonger in a grocery store, her mother a housewife. She grew up in an English-speaking Methodist home. Her older brother Kunio, was drafted into the U.S. Army. By 1940, they resided in one of the largest Japantowns in the country, a neighborhood in Sacramento, California that was home to 3,300 residents and hundreds of ethnic businesses. After graduating from Sacramento High School in 1938, Endo completed secretarial school and secured a civil service position as a typist with the California State's Department of Motor Vehicles in Sacramento, as it was one of the very few professions Japanese Americans could enter at the time due to rampant discrimination.

Following the December 7, 1941 attack on Pearl Harbor, President Roosevelt issued Executive Order 9066, compelling the forced evacuation and incarceration of Japanese-Americans from the West Coast in concentration camps. As a result, Endo was fired from her position as a stenographer at the California Department of Motor Vehicles. She was then incarcerated, along with her entire family, first transported to the Tule Lake War Relocation Center 300 miles (480 km) north of Sacramento.

Endo met her future husband, Kenneth Tsutsumi, after she was moved to the Topaz War Relocation Center in Utah.

== The California State Personnel Board lawsuit ==
In response to the Pearl Harbor attack, the California Legislature adopted Senate Concurrent Resolution 15 on January 19, 1942, which effectively barred qualified U.S.-born employees of Japanese descent from obtaining civil service employment with the State. By February 27, 1942 (eight days after Executive Order 9066 was signed and issued), the California Board of Equalization as directed by the State Personnel Board (SPB) had terminated all of California's civil servants of Japanese descent, totaling over 314 employees, including Mitsuye Endo. The State's cause for termination of each of its Japanese American employees was based on a blanket of false charges ranging from being a Japanese citizen to subscribing to a Japanese newspaper. On behalf of the 63 terminated employees who were eligible to file an appeal, Sumio Miyamoto, a dismissed employee, along with the Japanese American Citizens League, requested for San Francisco attorney James C. Purcell to represent them on their appeals. Purcell agreed and filed each employee's appeal. Each appellant, including Mitsuye Endo, contributed $10 to Purcell's legal fund.

As the employment lawsuits against the California State Personnel Board were pending in court, Purcell's clients were "evacuated" out of Sacramento to incarceration camps. Mitsuye Endo, herself was incarcerated, along with her entire family, first transported to the Sacramento Assembly Center, 10–15 miles (16–24 km) outside of Sacramento on May 15, 1942. Endo and her family were later transferred to the Tule Lake War Relocation Center 300 miles (480 km) north of Sacramento in Newell, California at the Oregon border on June 19, 1942.

After the closure of the Japanese Incarceration Camps by the U.S. government, Purcell won an order from the Attorney General's office to reinstate the wrongfully terminated employees and provide backpay for time lost between the termination and evacuation. By the end of the employment lawsuit, nearly all of the original plaintiffs, including Mitsuye Endo, had permanently resettled outside of California.

== Ex parte Endo ==
=== Writ ===
After the incarceration of his Japanese American clients, James Purcell decided to file suit against the detention of over 120,000 persons of Japanese ancestry, seeking to challenge the Administration and close the detention camps out west. Purcell sought an ‘ideal plaintiff’ to represent the lawsuit, and from the meager responses to his queries, selected Mitsuye's. A Methodist, Endo had never left the United States, was a Sacramento public school graduate and did not have ties to Japan. Her brother was an active duty Army serviceman. In addition, Endo was the only candidate who was willing to remain incarcerated in the camps through the entire course of the court case.

On July 13, 1942, Purcell filed a writ of habeas corpus, arguing, “If you can abrogate certain sections of the Constitution and incarcerate any person without trial or charges just because you do not like his nationality, what is to prevent from abrogating any or all of the Constitution?”.

The following year Judge Michael J. Roche of the United States District Court in Northern California denied her petition. Anticipating that Endo would file an appeal, the War Relocation Authority sent an officer to offer to release her family, contingent that she and they never return to the West coast or her former home. She turned the offer down; however, some other friends and families in the camp accepted relocation east, having tired of the camp's meager provisions, the harsh, cold environments and imprisonment. Endo's refusal to leave the camps extended her incarceration for an additional two years. Looking back at her decision to reject the opportunity to leave the incarceration camps, Endo wrote:

The fact that I wanted to prove that we of Japanese ancestry were not guilty of any crime that we were loyal American citizens kept me from abandoning the suit.

Her case continued under appeal, contrary to what the Roosevelt administration intended, and was certified to the U.S. Supreme Court for review on April 22, 1944.

Following the filing of the writ, the government moved Endo and her family to the Topaz War Relocation Center in Utah, in order to avoid the jurisdiction of the California court. While she was incarcerated in Topaz, Endo met her future husband, Kenneth Tsutsumi.

=== Supreme Court decision ===
In October 1944 the U.S. Supreme Court decreed that persons of Japanese descent could not be held in confinement without proof of their disloyalty, stating that:

... detention in Relocation Centers of persons of Japanese ancestry regardless of loyalty is not only unauthorized by the Congress or the Executive, but it is another example of the unconstitutional resort to racism in the entire evacuation program.

The Supreme Court also unambiguously stated that “the government had no legal right to confine people who had been screened and found to be loyal, but though it referred to the detention of Japanese-Americans as “racial discrimination,” it stopped short of defining the constitutional limits of wartime detention based on factors like race.”

In Endo's case—Ex parte Mitsuye Endo—the court unanimously ruled on Dec. 18, 1944, that the government could not detain citizens who were loyal to the United States.

The day before the ruling, hearing that the case would go against his Executive Order 9066 Pres. Roosevelt issued an order allowing Japanese Americans to return to the West Coast. The order, Public Proclamation No. 21 was issued by Major General Henry C. Pratt of the Western Defense Command.

== Later life ==
After they were released Endo and Tsutsumi moved to Chicago, Illinois and got married on Nov. 22, 1946. Endo's parents and two sisters, Tamiko and Rayko, relocated to Chicago alongside Endo. Absorbed in a community they found there of other Japanese Americans, they settled in and raised three children. She found employment as a secretary for the Mayor Edward J. Kelly's Committee on Race Relations. They rarely revisited their time in the camps, striving to fit in. Her daughter did not learn of her involvement with the lawsuit until she was in her 20s.

Later in life, when she was interviewed for “And Justice for All,” she marveled at how her incarceration and the subsequent court case “seemed like a dream” to her so many years later. “They felt I represented a symbolic, ‘loyal’ American,” she said in the documentary. "When I think about it now — that my case went to the Supreme Court — I'm awed by it," she said. "I never believed it, that I would be the one."

Endo died of cancer on April 14, 2006. She was 85.

== Posthumous awards ==
In May 2015, Senator Brian Schatz (D–Hawaii) sent a letter to President Obama recommending Endo for a posthumous Presidential Medal of Freedom. US Representatives Doris Matsui, Mike Honda, Mark Takai, and Mark Takano also advocated for Endo to receive the honor. In 2015 the California Senate issued a joint resolution to the same effect.

In January 2025, President Joe Biden posthumously honored her with the Presidential Citizens Medal which was accepted on her behalf by her son, Wayne Tsutsumi. The following statement was provided

In a shameful chapter in our Nation’s history, Mitsuye Endo was incarcerated alongside more than 120,000 Japanese Americans. Undaunted, she challenged the injustice and reached the Supreme Court. Her resolve allowed thousands of Japanese Americans to return home and rebuild their lives, reminding us that we are a Nation that stands for freedom for all.

== See also ==
- Korematsu v. United States

== Bibliography ==
- Tyler, Amanda L. Habeas Corpus in Wartime: From the Tower of London to Guantanamo Bay. Oxford University Press, 2017.
