= Anticanon =

List of infamous U.S. Supreme Court decisions

The anticanon in U.S. constitutional law is a small set of U.S. Supreme Court judgments that have subsequently become widely considered to have been grievously mistaken for their poor legal reasoning and negative consequences. Many have never been formally overturned, though the Supreme Court has usually limited their later effects, rhetorically repudiated them, and refused to cite them in subsequent cases.

One Harvard Law Review article defines the cases of the anticanon as:

- Dred Scott v. Sandford (1857): held that the U.S. Constitution did not extend American citizenship to people of black African descent, and thus they could not enjoy the rights and privileges the Constitution conferred upon American citizens. Described by Chief Justice Charles Evans Hughes as the Supreme Court’s “greatest self-inflicted wound”, the case was later abrogated, after the Civil War, by the Thirteenth Amendment, which abolished slavery and involuntary servitude, except as to penal labor, the Fourteenth Amendment, which confers citizenship to "[a]ll persons born or naturalized in the United States and subject to the jurisdiction thereof”, and the Fifteenth Amendment, which prohibits the denial or abridgment of suffrage by the federal or state governments' on account of "race, color, or previous condition of servitude."
- Plessy v. Ferguson (1896): established the doctrine of separate but equal by holding that racial segregation does not violate the Fourteenth Amendment as long as facilities are equal in quality. Superseded and overruled (de facto) by Brown v. Board of Education (1954) and Bolling v. Sharpe (1954), which held racial segregation in federal or state public schools unconstitutional. Runyon v. McCrary (1976) later held that racial segregation in private schools violates federal law. The Congressional Research Service considers Bob Jones University v. United States (1983), which held "racial discrimination in education violates a most fundamental national public policy", to have overruled the case de jure.
- Lochner v. New York (1905): held that a New York statute prescribing maximum working hours for bakers violated the bakers' right to freedom of contract under the Fourteenth Amendment. Lochner is part of the Lochner era in constitutional law, wherein the Supreme Court struck down many state economic regulations under the doctrine of substantive due process. The Lochner era ended in the late 1930s, usually attributed to President Franklin D. Roosevelt's court-packing threat that resulted in "the switch in time that saved nine" with West Coast Hotel Co. v. Parrish (1937), a case which bucked Lochner precedents.
- Korematsu v. United States (1944): upheld the exclusion of Japanese Americans from the West Coast Military Area during World War II, permitting the removal of Japanese Americans to internment camps. Decided on the same day as Ex parte Endo, which held that loyal citizens could not be detained without a hearing. Ex parte Endo effectively ended Japanese American internment. Overturned by Trump v. Hawaii (2018).
