= Fred T. Korematsu Institute for Civil Rights and Education =

- Type: Non-profit
- Founded: 2009
- Headquarters: San Francisco, California
- Key people: Karen Korematsu, co-founder; Ling Woo Liu, director
- Services: Education
- Website: korematsuinstitute.org

The Fred T. Korematsu Institute for Civil Rights and Education is a non-profit organization which advances pan-ethnic civil rights and human rights through education.

== History ==
=== Background ===
In 1942, Fred Korematsu was arrested for defying the government's internment camps for Japanese Americans during World War II. He appealed his case all the way to the Supreme Court in 1944, which ruled against him, saying the incarceration was justified due to military necessity. Four decades later, the discovery of new evidence allowed Korematsu to re-open his case with a team of pro-bono lawyers headed by legal scholar Peter H. Irons. In 1983, a federal court in San Francisco finally overturned Korematsu's conviction. In 1988, the United States federal government officially apologized for its discriminatory wartime actions and granted $20,000 in reparations to each surviving internee to help ensure that later injustices would never again impact another minority group. In 1998, Korematsu received from President Bill Clinton the Presidential Medal of Freedom, the nation's highest civilian award.

=== Establishment ===
In 2009, the Asian Law Caucus, together with Korematsu's daughter, Karen, launched the Korematsu Institute to commemorate the 25th anniversary of the removal of Korematsu's conviction. The institute's members advocated for the designation of January 30 as Fred Korematsu Day of Civil Liberties and the Constitution in California, and the legislature approved this in 2010. This was the first day in US history to be named after an Asian American. To mark the first Fred Korematsu Day on January 30, 2011, the Korematsu Institute began shipping out free Korematsu teaching kits to K-12 classrooms around California and held a commemorative event at University of California, Berkeley. Each year on Fred Korematsu Day, the organization honors Japanese Americans who have contributed to the advancement of civil rights.

In 2014, the Institute partnered with the San Joaquin County Office of Education to provide professional development for teachers on several civil rights topics, and was awarded a grant of $180,836.
