= Yasui =

Yasui (written: 安井 or 保井) is a Japanese surname. Notable people with the surname include:

- Hisaharu Yasui (安井 久治; 1951–2015), Japanese judge
- Hisato Yasui (安井 久登; born 1976), Japanese swimmer
- Junichiro Yasui (安井 潤一郎; born 1950), Japanese politician
- Kizo Yasui (安居 喜造; 1899–1983), Japanese businessman
- Kono Yasui (保井 コノ; 1880–1971), Japanese biologist
- Kunihiko Yasui (安井 邦彦; born 1960), Japanese voice actor
- Minoru Yasui (安井 稔; 1916–1986), American lawyer
- Misako Yasui (安井 美沙子; born 1965), Japanese politician
- Nakaji Yasui (安井 仲治; 1903–1942), Japanese photographer
- Yasui Sanchi (安井 算知; 1617–1703), Japanese Go player
- Sentetsu Yasui (安井 仙哲; 1734–1780), Japanese Go player
- Shōji Yasui (安井 昌二; 1928–2014), Japanese actor
- Yasui Sokken (安井 息軒; 1799–1876), Japanese Confucian scholar
- Sōtarō Yasui (安井 曾太郎; 1888–1955), Japanese painter
- Takuma Yasui (安井 琢磨; 1909–1995), Japanese economist
- Takuya Yasui (安井 拓也; born 1998), Japanese footballer
- Tamiko Yasui (保井 多美子; born 1942), Japanese fencer
- Seiichirō Yasui (安井 誠一郎; 1891–1962), Japanese politician
- Yukio Yasui (安井 行雄; born 1964), Japanese evolutionary biologist

== See also ==
- Yasui house, one of the four Schools of Go during the Edo period
- Yasui procedure, a pediatric heart operation
- Yasui v. United States (1943), a decision by the Supreme Court of the United States
