= Dale Minami =

American lawyer

Dale M. Minami
- Born: October 13, 1946 (age 80); Los Angeles, California
- Education: University of Southern California; University of California, Berkeley School of Law
- Occupation: Attorney
- Known for: Led the legal team overturning Korematsu vs. United States
- Spouse: Sandra Ai Mori
- Awards: ABA Medal in 2019 see list of awards
- Website: https://www.minamitamaki.com/

Dale M. Minami (born October 13, 1946) is a prominent Japanese American civil rights and personal injury lawyer based in San Francisco, California. He is best known for his work leading the legal team that overturned the conviction of Fred Korematsu, whose defiance of the incarceration of Japanese Americans during World War II led to Korematsu v. United States, which is widely considered one of the worst and most racist Supreme Court decisions in American history.

In addition to his civil rights work, Minami has been recognized as one of the top personal injury attorneys in the United States. He was named a top ten personal injury lawyers in Northern California in each year from 2013 through 2018 by Law & Politics Magazine. He is regularly ranked as a top "Super Lawyer" and regularly recognized as a "Best Lawyer" by the eponymous peer-reviewed publication.

== Early life and education ==
Minami was born in Los Angeles, California, on October 13, 1946, to Nisei parents who were victims of the incarceration of Japanese Americans during World War II. He grew up in Gardena, a suburb south of the city of Los Angeles. He graduated from Gardena High School where he was active as student body president and played varsity basketball and baseball.

He attended the University of Southern California, graduating magna cum laude with a BA in political science and Phi Beta Kappa in 1968. He received his Juris Doctor degree in 1971 from University of California, Berkeley School of Law.

== Civil rights work ==
In the early 1980s, Minami helped lead a legal team of pro bono attorneys in successfully reopening Korematsu v. United States, a landmark United States Supreme Court Case in 1944 which upheld Fred Korematsu’s conviction for refusing military orders aimed at the incarceration of Japanese Americans resulting in the imprisonment of 125,000 Americans of Japanese ancestry, 2/3 of whom were American citizens. They were denied notice of any charges, the right to a trial and the right to attorneys. The later lawsuit resulted in the erasure of Fred Korematsu's criminal conviction.

He was also involved in numerous legal cases and issues promoting the civil rights of Asian Pacific Americans. Among the cases were United Filipinos for Affirmative Action v. California Blue Shield which was the first employment class action lawsuit brought by Asian-Pacific Americans on behalf of Asian-Pacific Americans. The case resulted in a settlement for promotions to Asian Americans, programs to accelerate promotions and a community monitoring organization. Spokane JACL v. Washington State University was a class action to establish an Asian American Studies program at Washington State University which resulted in a settlement to establish an Asian American Studies program at the university.[13].

Minami also represented a UCLA professor, Don Nakanishi, in several grievance claims against UCLA for unfair and discriminatory decisions initially resulting in the denial of tenure. After several successful grievances and a prolonged struggle that became a cause célèbre in the Asian American community, the university granted tenure.

Minami has been involved in the judicial appointment process and in public policy and legislation. He served as a member of the California Fair Employment and Housing Commission. He chaired the California Attorney General's Asian Pacific Advisory Committee where he grew the committee's mandate to more assertively advocate for Asian American communities. He has also been a Commissioner on the California State Bar Association’s Commission on Judicial Nominee's Evaluation and Senator Barbara Boxer's Judicial Screening Committee.

In 1996, he was appointed by President Bill Clinton as chair of the board for the Civil Liberties Public Education Fund in 1996. The board which administered grants created by the Civil Liberties Act of 1988 to educate the public about the incarceration of Japanese Americans.

Minami is a co-founder of the Asian Law Caucus, first Asian American public interest/community legal organization supporting Asian Americans in the country. He also cofounded the Asian-American Bar Association of the Greater Bay Area, the Asian Pacific Bar of California and the Coalition of Asian Pacific Americans.

== Practice ==
Minami's San Francisco-based law firm, Minami Tamaki LLP, specializes in personal injury, immigration, consumer protection and employment law. Mr. Minami has been recognized as one of the top personal injury lawyers in the Bay Area. He was selected one of the Top Ten personal injury lawyers in Northern California in each year from 2013 through 2018 by Law & Politics Magazine, one of the Top 100 Super Lawyers for Northern California in 2005, 2007 through 2019 and a Super Lawyer for each year from 2004 through 2019 in the Personal Injury category. He is regularly recognized as a "Best Lawyer" in the United States by the eponymous peer-reviewed publication.

Clients have included Kristi Yamaguchi, Philip Kan Gotanda, and Steven Okazaki. He is counsel to several community organizations, including the Center for Asian American Media (formerly NAATA), and the Asian American Journalists Association.

== Awards ==
Minami has received numerous awards. These include the American Bar Association's 2003 Thurgood Marshall Award and its ABA Medal in 2019, the highest award given by the association. In 2008, UC Berkeley School of Law awarded Minami its Citation Award, its highest honor. In 2003, he received the ACLU Civil Liberties Award and the State Bar President's Pro Bono Service Award. A public interest fellowship has been named for him at UC Berkeley Law.

In 1993, students at the University of California, Santa Cruz voted to honor Dale Minami as one of the top-two vote getters alongside Queen Liliʻuokalani when voting on name preferences for what is now the Liliʻuokalani-Minami block at the university.

He received honorary juris doctor degrees from the McGeorge School of Law in 1995 and the University of San Francisco School of Law in 2010.

=== Partial list of awards ===
- Honorary Juris Doctor, University of the Pacific, McGeorge School of Law, 1995
- Boalt Hall Distinguished Service Award, Berkeley Law Alumni Association, 1996
- Spirit of Excellence Award, American Bar Association, 1997
- Asian Pacific Islander Heritage Month Award, KQED, 1998
- America's Top 50 Bachelors, People magazine, 2001
- Matthew O. Tobriner Public Service Award, Legal Aid Society Employment Law Center, 2002
- Thurgood Marshall Award, American Bar Association, 2003
- Civil Liberties Award, ACLU of Northern California, 2003
- Legal Impact Award, Asian Law Alliance (San Jose), 2006
- Vision Award, Japanese American Citizens League National Youth Council, 2007
- Citation Award, UC Berkeley School of Law, 2008
- Justice in Action Award, Asian American Legal Defense and Education Fund, 2009
- Honorary Juris Doctor, University of San Francisco School of Law, 2010
- Silver Spur Award, SPUR, 2011
- Inaugural From Roots to Branches Award, USC Asian Pacific Islander Students, 2012
- ABA Medal, American Bar Association, 2019
- Inaugural Norman Y. Mineta Lifetime Achievement Award, Asian Pacific American Institute for Congressional Studies, 2021
- Yuri Kochiyama Honorary Visionary Award, Asian Americans Advancing Justice, 2022

== Other activities ==
Minami was co-executive producer with Philip Kan Gotanda of Drinking Tea and Life Tastes Good, both of which were screened at the Sundance Film Festival.

In 2001, he was selected as one of America's Top 50 Bachelors by People magazine.

He is active in Asian American community organizations and has served on the board of governors for the Japanese American National Museum. He has been a lecturer at UC Berkeley and an instructor at Mills College.

== Personal life ==
Minami is married to Sandra Ai Mori. They have two daughters, ages 13 and 15 and a dog of unknown ancestry, Coco. He has two brothers, Dr. Roland Minami and Neil Minami.

== Publications ==
"Shikata ga nai: Legal Justice and Asian Americans", Church and Society, January - February, 1971, 6- 14.

"Asian Law Caucus: Experiment in an Alternative", Vol. 3, No. 1, Amerasia Journal, Summer, 1975.

"Coram Nobis and Redress:" in Japanese Americans, From Relocation to Redress, Edited by Sandra C. Taylor and Harry H.L. Kitano, 1986, p.200-202.

"Guerrilla War at UCLA: Political and Legal Dimensions of the Tenure Battle", Amerasia Journal, Vol 16, Number 1, 1990.

"Internment During World War II and Litigations", Asian Americans and the Supreme Court, edited by Hyung-Chan Kim, 1992, pp. 755-789.

Perspectives on Affirmative Action, contributor of an article, Common Ground, 1995, p. 11.

Korematsu v. United States: A “Constant Caution” in a Time of Crisis, Asian Law Journal, Vol. 10, Number 1, May, 2003.

Japanese American Redress, African-American Law & Policy Report, Vol. 6, Number 1, 2004.

“One Man Seeks Justice from a Nation: Korematsu v. United States”, Untold Civil Rights Stories: Asian Americans Speak out for Justice, 2009, Eric Yamamoto, Dale Minami and May Lee Heye.

“A Chance of a Lifetime", Pacific Citizen, December, 2008.

Echoes of History – 1942 – 1983 – 2017: From the Incarceration of Japanese Americans to the Travel Ban, Contra Costa Bar Journal October 1, 2017

Echo of History Resounds Today, Hawaii Herald, February 17, 2017
