= Fred Korematsu Day =

January 30 commemoration

The Fred Korematsu Day of Civil Liberties and the Constitution is celebrated in some parts of the USA on January 30 each year. It is recognized in seven states (Arizona, California, Florida, Hawaii, Michigan, New Jersey and Virginia) and New York City, and commemorates the birthday of Fred Korematsu, a Japanese-American civil rights activist best known for resisting the internment of Japanese Americans (see Korematsu v. US). It also recognizes American civil liberties and rights under the Constitution of the United States. It is the first day in U.S. history named after an Asian American.

== History ==
Legislation establishing Fred Korematsu Day was first signed into law by Governor Arnold Schwarzenegger of California on September 23, 2010, after passing unanimously in both the State Assembly and Senate.

It was first officially commemorated in 2011 at the University of California, Berkeley. Educational materials were also distributed to school teachers for classroom use.

== National Fred Korematsu Day ==
The U.S. Commission on Civil Rights recommended that a national Fred Korematsu Day be established as a national holiday in 2015.

In January 2023, the fight for a national Fred Korematsu Day continued with a resolution to establish a national Fred Korematsu Day of Civil Liberties and the Constitution introduced in the United States Congress led by Representatives Mark Takano and Jill Tokuda in the U.S. House and Senators Mazie Hirono and Tammy Duckworth in the Senate. A number of additional members of Congress made statements in support.

== Additional recognition ==
Since passage in California, Fred Korematsu Day has also been recognized in additional jurisdictions.

The states of Hawaii (2013), Virginia (2015), Florida (2016), Arizona (2021), Michigan (2023) and New Jersey (2023), as well as New York City (2018), have recognized Fred Korematsu Day in perpetuity by legislation.

Fred Korematsu Day was also celebrated in Illinois in 2014, but it is not clear whether then-governor Pat Quinn's proclamation extended past the year. Georgia, Pennsylvania, and Utah have also submitted resolutions honoring the day, while South Carolina has submitted a bill to their legislature.

== Other commemorations ==
Google recognized Fred Korematsu Day in 2017 with a Google Doodle by artist Sophie Diao, featuring a patriotic portrait of Korematsu wearing his Presidential Medal of Freedom, a scene of the internment camps to his back, surrounded by cherry blossoms, flowers that have come to be symbols of peace and friendship between the US and Japan.

== See also ==
- Day of Remembrance (Japanese Americans)
- Bainbridge Island Japanese American Exclusion Memorial
- Empty Chair Memorial
- Go for Broke Monument
- Harada House
- Japanese American Memorial to Patriotism During World War II
- National Japanese American Veterans Memorial Court
- Sakura Square
