= Yasui Sentetsu =

Japanese Go player

Yasui Sentetsu (安井 仙哲, 1734–1780) was a Japanese Go player, who is said to be born in either Aizu or Kawachi Province. His year of birth is unknown, but his birthname is believed to be Hara Gonhei (原 權平). He served as an apprentice to Yasui Shuntetsu Senkaku.

In 1748, he changed his birthname to his present name, and began playing castle game oshirogo (御城碁). As he was part of a famous Go house, he would play with the other Go houses in the shōgun's castle. In 1775, his mentor Yasui Shuntetsu Senkaku retired, causing him to become the sixth head of the Yasui house.

He died on September 4, 1780.

== Results ==
- 1748 (Kan'en 1) 3 games/win vs Inoue Shunseki
- 1749 (Kan'en 2) 5 games/loss vs Honinbo Hakugen
- 1750 (Kan'en 3) 2 games/win vs Inoue Shunseki
- 1751 (Hōreki 1) none vs Inoue Shuntatsu
- 1752 (Hōreki 2) 1 game/loss vs Honinbo Hakugen
- 1753 (Hōreki 3) 2 games/loss vs Hayashi Tennyu
- 1754 (Hōreki 4) 4 games/win vs Inoue Shuntatsu
- 1755 (Hōreki 5) 2 games/win vs Hayashi Tennyu
- 1756 (Hōreki 6) 2 games/loss vs Inoue Shunseki
- 1757 (Hōreki 7) 6 games/win vs Inoue Shunseki
- 1758 (Hōreki 8) 2 games/loss vs Honinbo Satsugen
- 1759 (Hōreki 9) 5 games/loss vs Inoue Shuntatsu
- 1760 (Hōreki 10) 4 games/win vs Hayashi Yugen

Preceded by Yasui Shuntetsu Senkaku	Yasui house head 1775–1780	Succeeded by Yasui Senchi

== Resources ==
木石庵「安井仙哲」

日本圍棋故事
