= Peter Irons =

American political activist

- Born: August 11, 1940 (age 86)

Academic background
- Education: Antioch College (BA); Boston University (MA, PhD); Harvard University (JD)
- Thesis: America's cold war crusade: domestic politics and foreign policy, 1942-48 (1972)

Peter H. Irons (born August 11, 1940) is an American political activist, civil rights attorney, legal scholar, and professor emeritus of political science. He has written many books on the U.S. Supreme Court and constitutional litigation.

== Education ==
Irons graduated from Antioch College (an early incubator of progressive politics).

He embarked on his current path in 1963 when he was sentenced to three years imprisonment at the Federal Correctional Institution in Danbury, Connecticut for refusing military induction on the ground that the Federal government perpetuated racial discrimination. While serving most of that sentence, he began corresponding with Howard Zinn, who sent him books on civil liberties and American politics. His conviction was ultimately reversed by a federal judge on the ground of prosecutorial misconduct. Later, President Gerald Ford granted him a pardon for refusing induction.

== Career ==
Irons completed a PhD in political science at Boston University in 1973. Afterwards, Zinn helped arrange for him to work at a law firm defending Daniel Ellsberg, who was under federal prosecution at the time for stealing the Pentagon Papers. His work at the law firm would later serve as motivation for him to pursue a J.D. degree from Harvard Law School, which he received in 1978.

Upon graduating, he taught at Boston College Law School and the University of Massachusetts before moving to the University of California, San Diego. There in 1982 he established the Earl Warren Bill of Rights Project, of which he is the director. He was chosen in 1988 as the first Raoul Wallenberg Distinguished Visiting professor of Human Rights at Rutgers University. He has lectured on constitutional law and civil liberties at the law schools of Harvard, Yale, Berkeley, Stanford, and more than 20 other schools.

He was also elected to two terms on the national board of the American Civil Liberties Union.

In addition to teaching and authoring several books, he has also helped reopen the wartime internment cases of Fred Korematsu, Minoru Yasui, and Gordon Hirabayashi. Judge Marilyn Hall Patel heard the Korematsu case.

He is an Emeritus Professor of Political Science at the University of California, San Diego and an author on legal history. He retired from the university in 2004 and now devotes some of his time to causes that interest him. He has undertaken some legal work in issues of the separation of church and state and written some articles for the Montana Law Review.

Starting in 1989, Irons represented the plaintiffs in the Mount Soledad case in San Diego, pro bono. He discontinued his involvement in the case in 1998 when threats made him fear for the safety of his two daughters.

== Awards ==
- 1984 – Durfee Award
- 1986 – UCSD certificate of excellence
- 1989 – Ceil Podoloff Award by the American Civil Liberties Union (ACLU)
- 1989 – American Bar Association Certificate of Merit award The Courage of Their Convictions: Sixteen Americans Who Fought Their Way to the U.S. Supreme Court

== Works ==
=== Books ===
- Irons, Peter H. (1982). The New Deal lawyers. Princeton, N.J: Princeton University Press. ISBN 0-691-04688-3.
- Irons, Peter H. (1983). Justice at war. Oxford Oxfordshire: Oxford University Press. ISBN 0-19-503273-X.
- Irons, Peter H. (1988). The Courage of Their Convictions: Sixteen Americans Who Fought Their Way to the Supreme Court. New York: Free Press. ISBN 0-02-915670-X.
- Irons, Peter H. (1989). Justice delayed: the record of the Japanese American internment cases. Middletown, Conn: Wesleyan University Press. ISBN 0-8195-6175-4.
- Irons, Peter H. (1991). Making Law: The Case for Judicial Activism. Free Press. ISBN 0-02-915671-8.
- Stephanie Guitton; Irons, Peter H. (1993). May It Please the Court: The Most Significant Oral Arguments Made Before the Supreme Court Since 1955. New York: New Press. ISBN 1-56584-036-4.
- Irons, Peter H. (1994). Brennan vs. Rehnquist: the battle for the Constitution. New York: Alfred A. Knopf, Inc. ISBN 0-679-42436-9.
- Irons, Peter H.; Stephanie Guitton (1995). May It Please the Court: Arguments on Abortion/Book and 2 Cassettes. New York: New Press. ISBN 1-56584-223-5.
- Irons, Peter H. (1997). May It Please The Court: The First Amendment. Diane Pub Co. ISBN 0-7567-7619-8.
- Irons, Peter H. (1999). A People's History of the Supreme Court. New York, N.Y: Viking. ISBN 0-670-87006-4.

2000 Silver Gavel Award Honorable Mention

- Irons, Peter H. (2000). May it please the court: courts, kids, and the constitution. New York: New Press. ISBN 1-56584-613-3.
- Irons, Peter H. (2002). Jim Crow's children: the broken promise of the Brown decision. New York, N.Y: Viking. ISBN 0-670-88918-0.

2003 Silver Gavel Award Winner

- Irons, Peter H. (2004). Cases and Controversies : Civil Rights and Liberties in Context. Englewood Cliffs, N.J: Prentice Hall. ISBN 0-13-045624-1.
- Irons, Peter H. (2005). War powers: how the imperial presidency hijacked the Constitution. New York: Metropolitan Books. ISBN 0-8050-7593-3.
- Irons, Peter H. (2007). God on Trial: Dispatches from America's Religious Battlefields. Viking Adult. ISBN 978-0-670-03851-0.

=== Video courses ===
- Irons, Peter; Finn, John E. "Civil Liberties and the Bill of Rights & History of the Supreme Court". The Teaching Company.
- Irons, Peter. "History of the Supreme Court". The Teaching Company.

=== Articles ===
- Irons, Peter (2007). "Disaster in Dover: The Trials (and Tribulations) of Intelligent Design" (PDF). Montana Law Review. 68 (1). Archived from the original (PDF) on September 27, 2007.
