= Korematsu v. United States =

1944 U.S. Supreme Court case upholding the internment of Japanese Americans

- Supreme Court of the United States

Argued October 11–12, 1944 Decided December 18, 1944
- Full case name: Fred Korematsu v. United States
- Citations: 323 U.S. 214 (more) 65 S. Ct. 193; 89 L. Ed. 194; 1944 U.S. LEXIS 1341

Case history
- Prior: Certiorari to the Court of Appeals for the Ninth Circuit, 140 F.2d 289 (9th Cir. 1943)

Holding
- The exclusionary order which caused the internment of Japanese Americans during World War II was permissible. Executive Order 9066 was constitutional.

Court membership
- Chief Justice Harlan F. Stone Associate Justices Owen Roberts · Hugo Black; Stanley F. Reed · Felix Frankfurter; William O. Douglas · Frank Murphy; Robert H. Jackson · Wiley B. Rutledge

Case opinions
- Majority: Black, joined by Stone, Reed, Frankfurter, Douglas and Rutledge
- Concurrence: Frankfurter
- Dissent: Roberts
- Dissent: Murphy
- Dissent: Jackson

Laws applied
- Executive Order 9066; U.S. Const. amend. V
- Overruled by
- Trump v. Hawaii (2018)

Fred Korematsu v. United States, 323 U.S. 214 (1944), is a decision by the Supreme Court of the United States that upheld the exclusion of people of Japanese descent from the West Coast Military Area during World War II, an exclusion that led to the internment of Japanese Americans. The decision has been widely criticized, with some scholars describing it as "an odious and discredited artifact of popular bigotry" and "a stain on American jurisprudence". The case is often cited as one of the worst Supreme Court decisions of all time.

In the aftermath of Imperial Japan's attack on Pearl Harbor, President Franklin D. Roosevelt had issued Executive Order 9066 on February 19, 1942, authorizing the U.S. War Department to create military areas from which any or all Americans might be excluded. Subsequently, the Western Defense Command, a U.S. Army military command charged with coordinating the defense of the West Coast of the United States, ordered "all persons of Japanese ancestry, including aliens and non-aliens" to relocate to internment camps. However, a 23-year-old Japanese-American man, Fred Korematsu, refused to leave the exclusion zone and instead challenged the order on the grounds that it violated the Fifth Amendment.

In a majority opinion joined by five other justices, Associate Justice Hugo Black held that the need to protect against espionage by Japan outweighed the rights of Americans of Japanese ancestry. Black wrote that "Korematsu was not excluded from the Military Area because of hostility to him or his race", but rather "because the properly constituted military authorities ... decided that the military urgency of the situation demanded that all citizens of Japanese ancestry be segregated from the West Coast" during the war against Japan. Dissenting justices Frank Murphy, Robert H. Jackson, and Owen J. Roberts all criticized the exclusion as racially discriminatory; Murphy wrote that the exclusion of Japanese "falls into the ugly abyss of racism" and resembled "the abhorrent and despicable treatment of minority groups by the dictatorial tyrannies which this nation is now pledged to destroy."

The Korematsu opinion was the first instance in which the Supreme Court applied the strict scrutiny standard of review to racial discrimination by the government; it is one of only a handful of cases in which the Court held that the government met this standard. Korematsu's conviction was voided by a California district court in 1983 on the grounds that Solicitor General Charles H. Fahy had suppressed a report from the Office of Naval Intelligence which stated there was no evidence that Japanese Americans were acting as spies for Japan. The Japanese-Americans who were interned were later granted reparations through the Civil Liberties Act of 1988. In Trump v. Hawaii (2018), the Supreme Court overruled Korematsu v. United States.

== Background ==
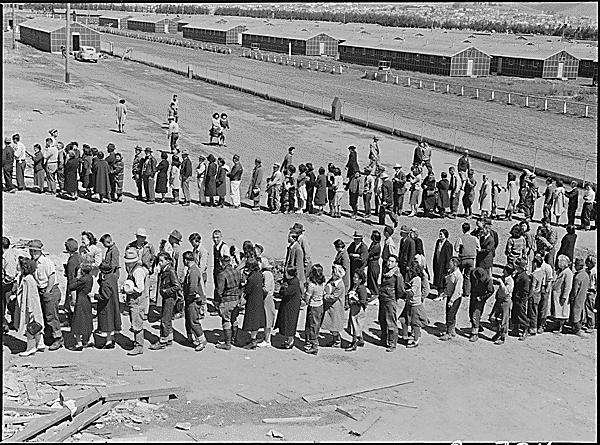
Japanese American Assembly Center at Tanforan race track, San Bruno

In the wake of the Japanese attack on Pearl Harbor and the report of the First Roberts Commission, President Franklin D. Roosevelt issued Executive Order 9066 on February 19, 1942, authorizing the War Department to create military areas from which any or all Americans might be excluded, and to provide for the necessary transport, lodging, and feeding of persons displaced from such areas. On March 2, 1942, the U.S. Army Lieutenant General John L. DeWitt, commander of the Western Defense Command, issued Public Proclamation No. 1, demarcating western military areas and the exclusion zones therein, and directing any "Japanese, German, or Italian aliens" and any person of Japanese ancestry to inform the U.S. Postal Service of any changes of residence. Further military areas and zones were demarcated in Public Proclamation No. 2.

In the meantime, Secretary of War Henry L. Stimson mailed to Senator Robert Rice Reynolds and House Speaker Sam Rayburn draft legislation authorizing the enforcement of Executive Order 9066. By March 21, Congress had enacted the proposed legislation, which Roosevelt signed into law. On March 24, 1942, Western Defense Command began issuing Civilian Exclusion orders, commanding "all persons of Japanese ancestry, including aliens and non-aliens" report to designated assembly points. With the issuance of Civilian Restrictive Order No. 1 on May 19, 1942, Japanese Americans were forced to move into relocation camps.

Meanwhile, Fred Korematsu was a 23-year-old Japanese-American man who decided to stay at his residence in San Leandro, California, instead of obeying the order to relocate; however, he knowingly violated Civilian Exclusion Order No. 34 of the U.S. Army, even undergoing plastic surgery in an attempt to conceal his identity. Korematsu argued that Executive Order 9066 violated the Fifth Amendment to the United States Constitution and was thus unconstitutional. The Fifth Amendment was selected over the Fourteenth Amendment due to the lack of federal protections in the Fourteenth Amendment. He was arrested and convicted. No question was raised as to Korematsu's loyalty to the United States. The Court of Appeals for the Ninth Circuit eventually affirmed his conviction, and the Supreme Court granted certiorari.

== Decision ==
=== Black's majority opinion ===
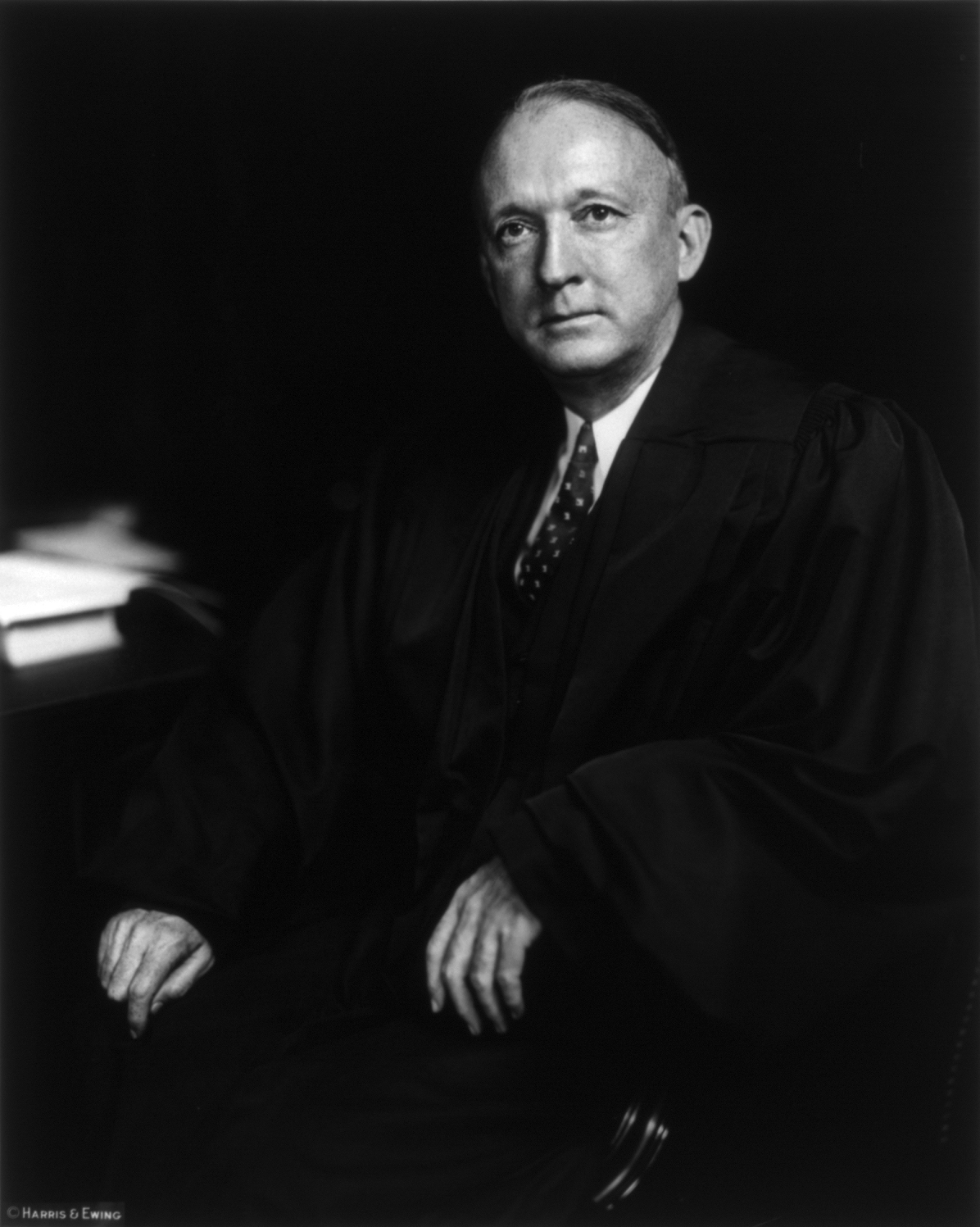
Justice Hugo Black

The decision of the case, written by Justice Hugo Black, found the case largely indistinguishable from the previous year's Hirabayashi v. United States decision, and rested largely on the same principle: deference to Congress and the military authorities, particularly in light of the uncertainty following Pearl Harbor. Justice Black further denied that the case had anything to do with racial prejudice:

Korematsu was not excluded from the Military Area because of hostility to him or his race. He was excluded because we are at war with the Japanese Empire, because the properly constituted military authorities feared an invasion of our West Coast and felt constrained to take proper security measures, because they decided that the military urgency of the situation demanded that all citizens of Japanese ancestry be segregated from the West Coast temporarily, and, finally, because Congress, reposing its confidence in this time of war in our military leaders—as inevitably it must—determined that they should have the power to do just this.

In his diaries, Justice Felix Frankfurter reported that Justice Black told the justices as reason for deferring to the executive branch: "Somebody must run this war. It is either Roosevelt or us. And we cannot."

While Korematsu is regularly described as upholding the internment of Japanese Americans, the majority opinion expressly declined to reach the issue of internment on the ground that Korematsu's conviction did not present that issue, which it said raised different questions. The Court cross-referenced its decision the same day in Ex Parte Endo, 323 U.S. 283 (1944), in which the Court ruled that a loyal Japanese American must be released from detention.

=== Frankfurter's concurrence ===
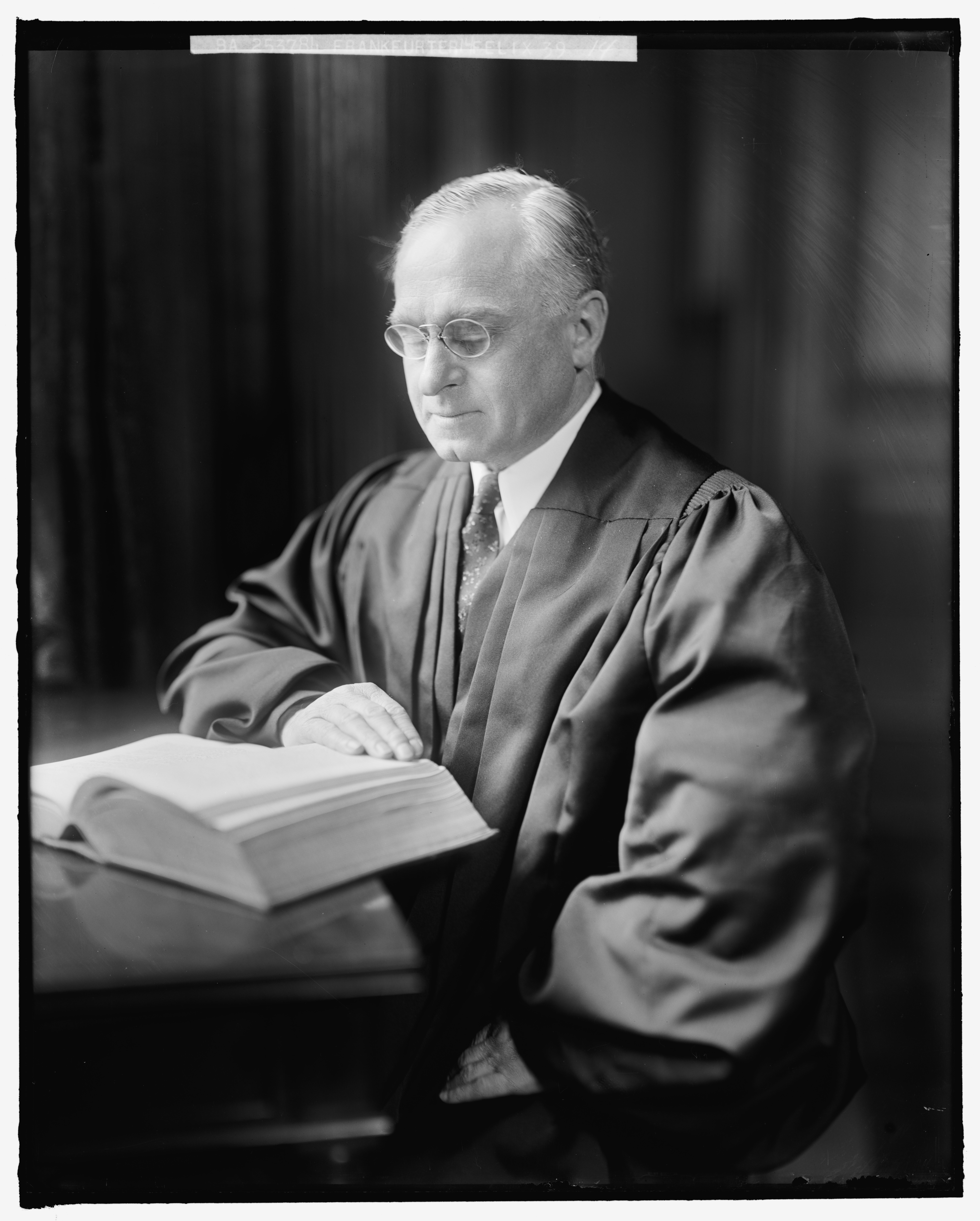
Justice Felix Frankfurter

Justice Frankfurter's concurrence reads:

[W]ithin their sphere, military authorities are no more outside the bounds of obedience to the Constitution than are judges within theirs. "The war power of the United States, like its other powers... is subject to applicable constitutional limitations", Hamilton v. Kentucky Distilleries Co., 251 U.S. 146, 156. To recognize that military orders are "reasonably expedient military precautions" in time of war, and yet to deny them constitutional legitimacy, makes of the Constitution an instrument for dialectic subtleties not reasonably to be attributed to the hard-headed Framers, of whom a majority had had actual participation in war. If a military order such as that under review does not transcend the means appropriate for conducting war, such action by the military is as constitutional as would be any authorized action by the Interstate Commerce Commission within the limits of the constitutional power to regulate commerce. And, being an exercise of the war power explicitly granted by the Constitution for safeguarding the national life by prosecuting war effectively, I find nothing in the Constitution which denies to Congress the power to enforce such a valid military order by making its violation an offense triable in the civil courts. Compare Interstate Commerce Commission v. Brimson, 154 U.S. 447; 155 U.S. 3, and Monongahela Bridge Co. v. United States, 216 U.S. 177. To find that the Constitution does not forbid the military measures now complained of does not carry with it approval of that which Congress and the Executive did. That is their business, not ours.

=== Murphy's dissent ===
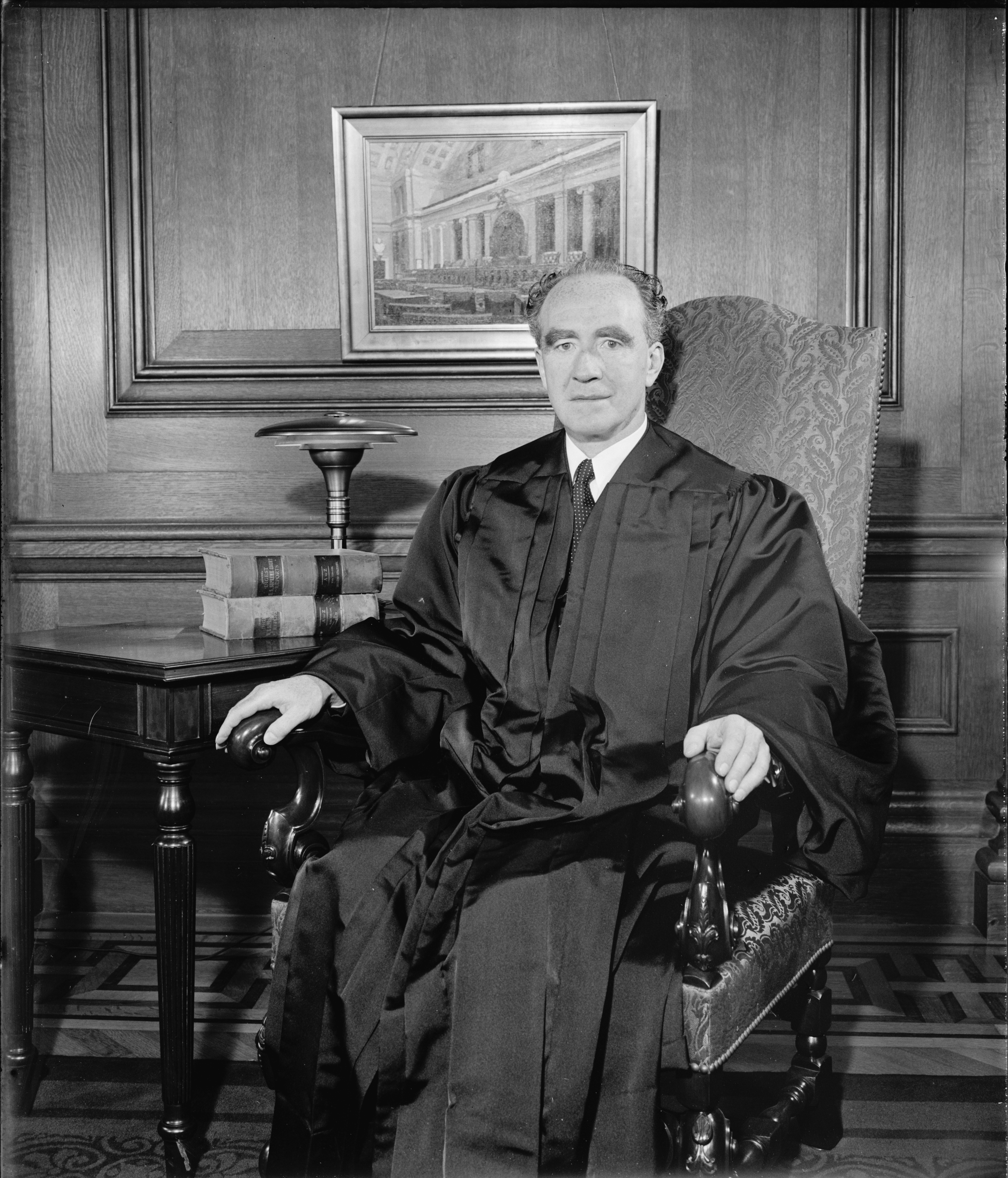
Justice Frank Murphy

Justice Frank Murphy issued a vehement dissent, saying that the exclusion of Japanese "falls into the ugly abyss of racism", and resembles "the abhorrent and despicable treatment of minority groups by the dictatorial tyrannies which this nation is now pledged to destroy." Murphy argued that collective punishment for Japanese Americans was an unconstitutional response to any disloyalty that might have been found in a minority of their cohort. He also compared the treatment of Japanese Americans with the treatment of Americans of German and Italian ancestry, as evidence that race, and not emergency alone, led to the exclusion order which Korematsu was convicted of violating:

I dissent, therefore, from this legalization of racism. Racial discrimination in any form and in any degree has no justifiable part whatever in our democratic way of life. It is unattractive in any setting, but it is utterly revolting among a free people who have embraced the principles set forth in the Constitution of the United States. All residents of this nation are kin in some way by blood or culture to a foreign land. Yet they are primarily and necessarily a part of the new and distinct civilization of the United States. They must, accordingly, be treated at all times as the heirs of the American experiment, and as entitled to all the rights and freedoms guaranteed by the Constitution.

Justice Murphy's two uses of the term "racism" in this opinion, along with two additional uses in his concurrence in Steele v. Louisville & Nashville Railway Co., decided the same day, are among the first appearances of the word "racism" in a United States Supreme Court opinion. The first appearance was in Justice Murphy's concurrence in Ex parte Endo, 323 U.S. 283 (1944). The term was also used in other cases, such as Duncan v. Kahanamoku, 327 U.S. 304 (1946) and Oyama v. California, 332 U.S. 633 (1948). It then disappeared from the court's lexicon for 18 years before reappearing in Brown v. Louisiana, 383 U.S. 131 (1966).

Justice Murphy's dissent is considered the strongest of the three dissenting opinions and, since the 1980s, has been cited as part of modern jurisprudence's categorical rejection of the majority opinion.

=== Roberts's dissent ===
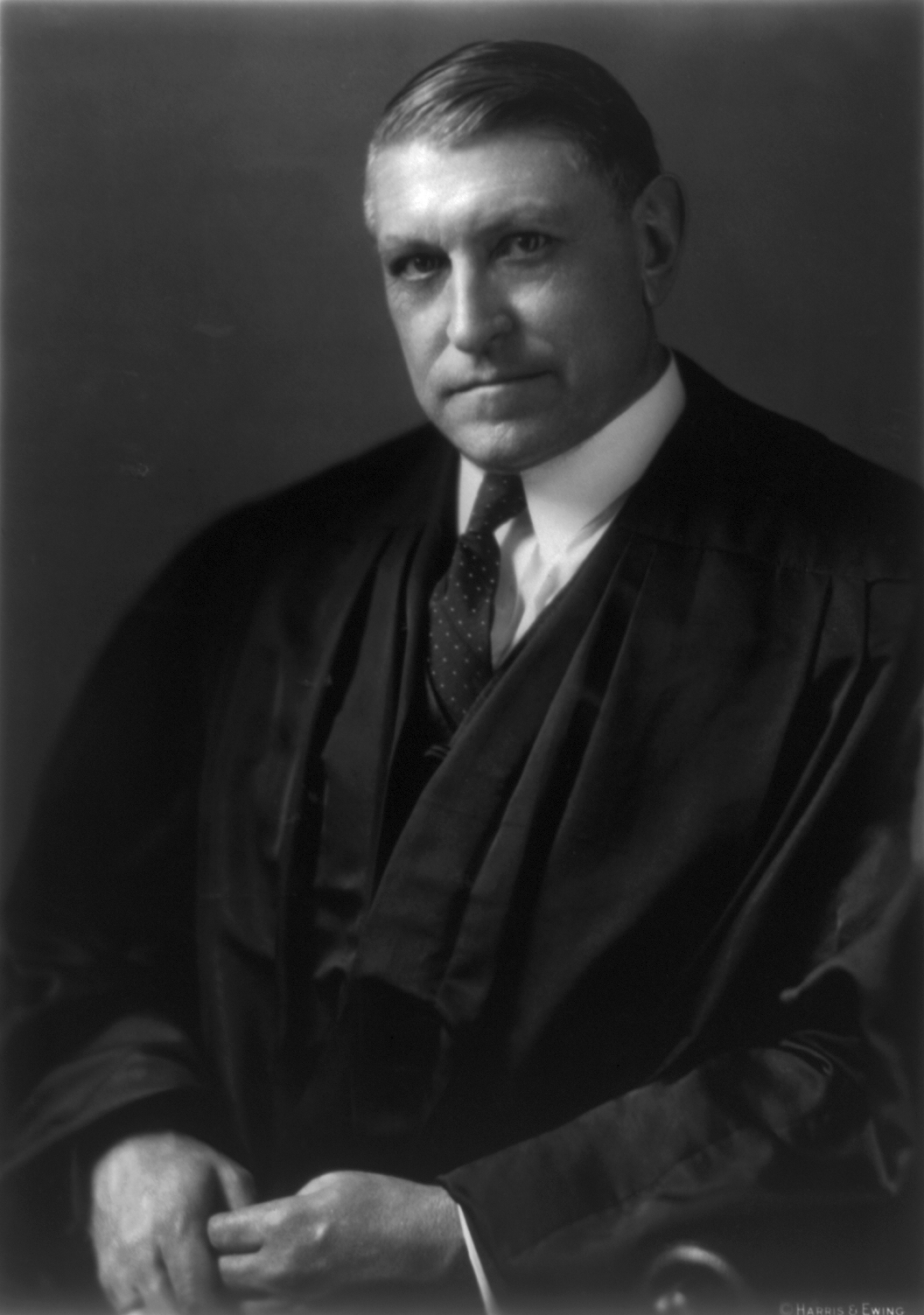
Justice Owen Roberts

Justice Roberts's dissent also acknowledges the racism inherent in the case although he does not use the word. He recognized that the defendant was being punished based solely upon his ancestry:

This is not a case of keeping people off the streets at night, as was Hirabayashi v. United States, 320 U.S. 81, [p. 226] nor a case of temporary exclusion of a citizen from an area for his own safety or that of the community, nor a case of offering him an opportunity to go temporarily out of an area where his presence might cause danger to himself or to his fellows. On the contrary, it is the case of convicting a citizen as a punishment for not submitting to imprisonment in a concentration camp, based on his ancestry, and solely because of his ancestry, without evidence or inquiry concerning his loyalty and good disposition towards the United States. If this be a correct statement of the facts disclosed by this record, and facts of which we take judicial notice, I need hardly labor the conclusion that Constitutional rights have been violated.

=== Jackson's dissent ===
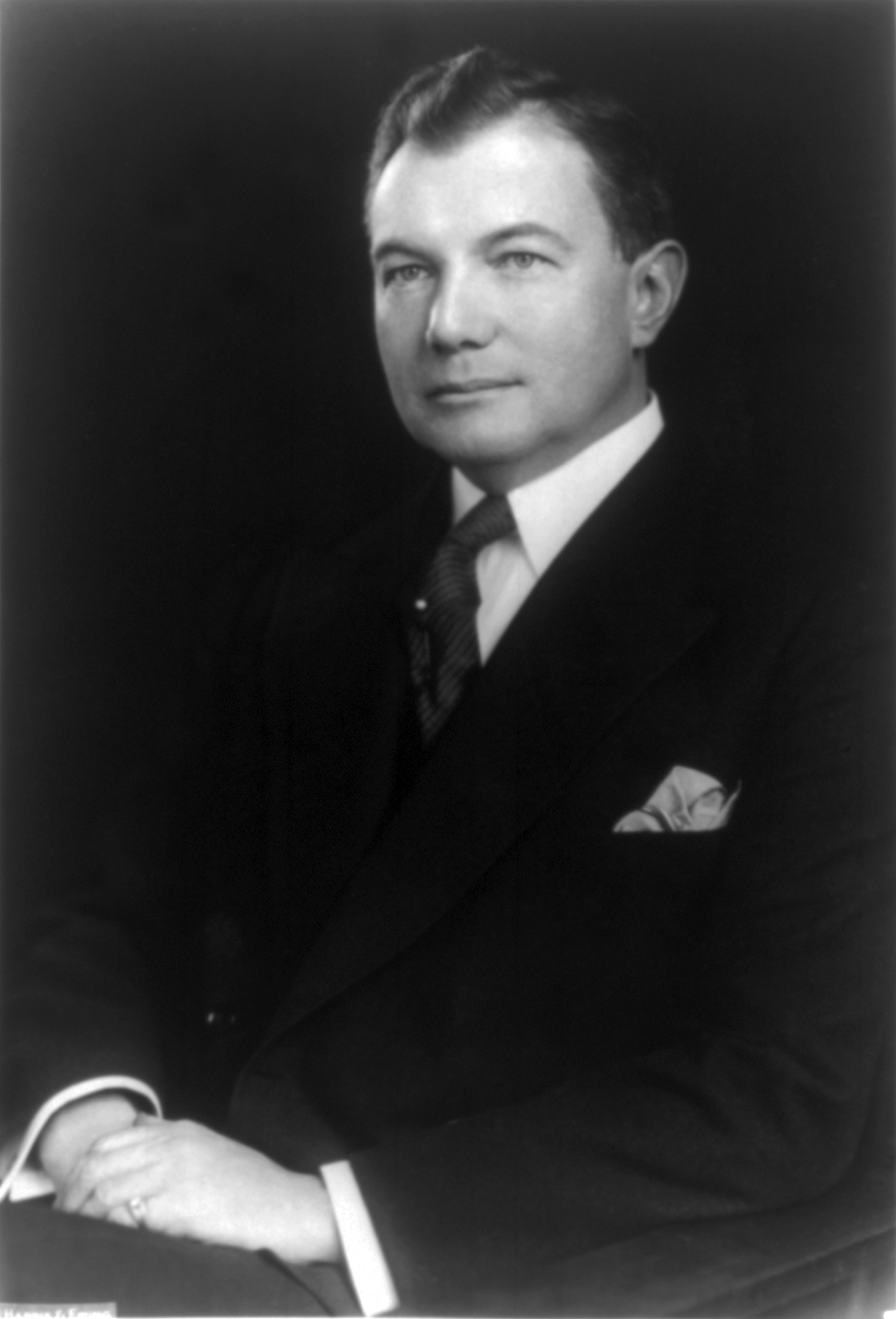
Justice Robert Jackson

By contrast, Justice Robert Jackson's dissent argued that "defense measures will not, and often should not, be held within the limits that bind civil authority in peace", and that it would perhaps be unreasonable to hold the military, who issued the exclusion order, to the same standards of constitutionality that apply to the rest of the government. "In the very nature of things", he wrote, "military decisions are not susceptible of intelligent judicial appraisal." He acknowledged the Court's powerlessness in that regard, writing that "courts can never have any real alternative to accepting the mere declaration of the authority that issued the order that it was reasonably necessary from a military viewpoint."

He nonetheless dissented, writing that, even if the courts should not be put in the position of second-guessing or interfering with the orders of military commanders, that does not mean that they should have to ratify or enforce those orders if they are unconstitutional. Jackson writes, "I do not think [the civil courts] may be asked to execute a military expedient that has no place in law under the Constitution. I would reverse the judgment and discharge the prisoner." Indeed, he cautioned that the precedent of Korematsu might last well beyond the war and the internment:

A military order, however unconstitutional, is not apt to last longer than the military emergency. Even during that period, a succeeding commander may revoke it all. But once a judicial opinion rationalizes such an order to show that it conforms to the Constitution, or rather rationalizes the Constitution to show that the Constitution sanctions such an order, the Court for all time has validated the principle of racial discrimination in criminal procedure and of transplanting American citizens. The principle then lies about like a loaded weapon, ready for the hand of any authority that can bring forward a plausible claim of an urgent need. Every repetition imbeds that principle more deeply in our law and thinking and expands it to new purposes.

Jackson further warned:

Of course the existence of a military power resting on force, so vagrant, so centralized, so necessarily heedless of the individual, is an inherent threat to liberty. But I would not lead people to rely on this Court for a review that seems to me wholly delusive. The military reasonableness of these orders can only be determined by military superiors. If the people ever let command of the war power fall into irresponsible and unscrupulous hands, the courts wield no power equal to its restraint. The chief restraint upon those who command the physical forces of the country, in the future as in the past, must be their responsibility to the political judgments of their contemporaries and to the moral judgments of history.

Jackson acknowledged the racial issues at hand, writing:

Now, if any fundamental assumption underlies our system, it is that guilt is personal and not inheritable. Even if all of one's antecedents had been convicted of treason, the Constitution forbids its penalties to be visited upon him. But here is an attempt to make an otherwise innocent act a crime merely because this prisoner is the son of parents as to whom he had no choice, and belongs to a race from which there is no way to resign. If Congress in peace-time legislation should enact such a criminal law, I should suppose this Court would refuse to enforce it.

== Subsequent history ==
=== Congressional Commission on Wartime Relocation and Internment of Civilians ===
In 1980, Congress established a commission to evaluate the events leading up to the issuance of Executive Order 9066 and accompanying military directives and their impact on citizens and resident aliens, charging the commission with recommending remedies. Discussing the Korematsu decision in their 1982 report entitled Personal Justice Denied, this Congressional Commission on Wartime Relocation and Internment of Civilians (CCWRIC) concluded that "each part of the decision, questions of both factual review and legal principles, has been discredited or abandoned", and that, "Today the decision in Korematsu lies overruled in the court of history."

=== Conviction overturned ===
Korematsu challenged his conviction in 1983 by filing before the United States District Court for the Northern District of California a writ of coram nobis, which asserted that the original conviction was so flawed as to represent a grave injustice that should be reversed. As evidence, he submitted the conclusions of the CCWRIC report as well as newly discovered internal Justice Department communications demonstrating that evidence contradicting the military necessity for the Executive Order 9066 had been knowingly withheld from the Supreme Court. Specifically, he said Solicitor General Charles H. Fahy had kept from the Court a wartime finding by the Office of Naval Intelligence, the Ringle Report, that concluded very few Japanese represented a risk and that almost all of those who did were already in custody when the Executive Order was enacted. While not admitting error, the government submitted a counter-motion asking the court to vacate the conviction without a finding of fact on its merits. Judge Marilyn Hall Patel denied the government's petition, and concluded that the Supreme Court had indeed been given a selective record, representing a compelling circumstance sufficient to overturn the original conviction. She granted the writ, thereby voiding Korematsu's conviction, while pointing out that since this decision was based on prosecutorial misconduct and not an error of law, any legal precedent established by the case remained in force.

=== 2011 DOJ admission of error ===
On May 20, 2011, Acting Solicitor General Neal Katyal released an unusual statement denouncing one of his predecessors, Solicitor General Charles H. Fahy. He faulted Fahy for having "suppressed critical evidence" in the Hirabayashi and Korematsu cases before the Supreme Court during World War II, specifically the Ringle Report's conclusion that there was no indication Japanese Americans were acting as spies or sending signals to enemy submarines. The rulings in the 1980s that overturned the convictions of Korematsu and Hirabayashi concluded that failure to disclose the Ringle Report, along with an initial report by General De Witt that demonstrated racist motivations behind the military orders, represented a fatal flaw in the prosecution of their cases before the Supreme Court. Katyal noted that Justice Department attorneys had actually alerted Fahy that failing to disclose the Ringle Report's existence in the briefs or argument in the Supreme Court "might approximate the suppression of evidence". Thus, Katyal concluded that Fahy "did not inform the Court that a key set of allegations used to justify the internment" had been doubted, if not fully discredited, within the government's own agencies.

Katyal therefore announced his office's filing of a formal "admission of error". He emphasized the duty of the Solicitor General to address the Court with "absolute candor", due to the "special credence" the Court explicitly grants to the Solicitor's court submissions.

=== 21st-century reactions ===
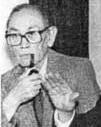
Fred Korematsu

Eleven lawyers who had represented Fred Korematsu, Gordon Hirabayashi, and Minoru Yasui in successful efforts in lower federal courts to nullify their convictions for violating military curfew and exclusion orders sent a letter dated January 13, 2014, to Solicitor General Donald Verrilli Jr. In light of the appeal proceedings before the U.S. Supreme Court in Hedges v. Obama, the lawyers asked Verrilli to ask the Supreme Court to overrule its decisions in Korematsu, Hirabayashi (1943), and Yasui (1943). If the Solicitor General should not do this, they asked that the United States government to "make clear" that the federal government "does not consider the internment decisions as valid precedent for governmental or military detention of individuals or groups without due process of law".

On February 3, 2014, Justice Antonin Scalia, during a discussion with law students at the University of Hawaii at Manoa's William S. Richardson School of Law, warned that "the Supreme Court's Korematsu decision upholding the internment of Japanese Americans was wrong, but it could happen again in war time." In October 2015 at Santa Clara University, Scalia told law students that Justice Jackson's dissenting opinion in Korematsu was the past court opinion he admired most, adding "It was nice to know that at least somebody on the court realized that that was wrong."

Donald Trump's Presidential election in 2016 led Kansas Secretary of State Kris Kobach to advocate for Trump to implement immigration controls like the National Security Entry-Exit Registration System. One Trump supporter, Carl Higbie, said that Jimmy Carter's 1980 restriction on Iranian immigration, as well as the Korematsu decision, give legal precedent for a registry of immigrants. Critics of Higbie argued that Korematsu should not be referenced as precedent. Constitutional lawyer Bruce Fein argued that the Civil Liberties Act of 1988 granting reparations to the Japanese Americans who were interned amounts to Korematsu having been overturned by history—outside of a potential formal overruling by the Supreme Court. Another critic of Higbie described Korematsu as a "stain on American jurisprudence".

According to Harvard University's Felix Frankfurter Professor of Law Noah Feldman, "a decision can be wrong at the very moment it was decided—and therefore should not be followed subsequently." Justice Anthony Kennedy applied this approach in Lawrence v. Texas to overturn Bowers v. Hardwick and thereby strike down anti-sodomy laws in 14 states. The implication is that decisions which are wrong when decided should not be followed even before the Court reverses itself, and Korematsu has probably the greatest claim to being wrong when decided of any case which still stood. Legal scholars Richard Primus applied the term "anti-canon" to cases which are "universally assailed as wrong, immoral, and unconstitutional"; Richard Primus describes them as exemplars of faulty legal reasoning. Plessy v. Ferguson is one such example, and Korematsu has joined this group—as Feldman then put it, "Korematsu's uniquely bad legal status means it's not precedent even though it hasn't been overturned." Laurence Tribe points out that even in Korematsu the Court states in dictum that "racial antagonism" cannot justify a racial classification that restricts civil rights.

=== Trump v. Hawaii and Students for Fair Admissions v. Harvard ===
Over seven decades after Korematsu was decided, the Supreme Court disavowed the original ruling in Trump v. Hawaii (2018). Chief Justice John Roberts's opinion for the court indicated that it no longer found Korematsu persuasive. Chief Justice Roberts stated that:

The forcible relocation of U.S. citizens to concentration camps, solely and explicitly on the basis of race, is objectively unlawful and outside the scope of Presidential authority.

Quoting Justice Robert H. Jackson's 1944 dissent, Roberts added:

Korematsu was gravely wrong the day it was decided, has been overruled in the court of history, and—to be clear—'has no place in law under the Constitution.'

— Trump v. Hawaii, slip op. at 38 (quoting 323 U.S., at 248 (Jackson, J., dissenting))

On the Constitution Annotated website, the Congressional Research Service has included Korematsu in its "Table of Supreme Court Decisions Overruled by Subsequent Decisions", with the overruling decision being Trump v. Hawaii. In Students for Fair Admissions v. Harvard (2023), Roberts, again in an opinion for the majority, stated that the Court had explicitly overruled Korematsu in 2018. In a footnote, Roberts wrote:

[In Korematsu], the Court upheld the internment of “all persons of Japanese ancestry in prescribed West Coast ... areas” during World War II because "the military urgency of the situation demanded" it. [314 U.S.], at 217, 223. We have since overruled Korematsu, recognizing that it was "gravely wrong the day it was decided." Trump v. Hawaii, 585 U.S. [667], [710] (2018) (slip op. at 8)

— Chief Justice John Roberts, 600 U.S. 181, 207 n.3 (2023)

== See also ==
- Fred Korematsu Day
- Fred T. Korematsu Institute for Civil Rights and Education
- Japanese American redress and court cases
- Mochizuki v. United States
- Trail of Tears
