= Hirabayashi =

Hirabayashi (written: 平林) is a Japanese surname. Notable people with the surname include:

- Aikoku Hirabayashi (平林 愛国, 1909–?), Japanese boxer
- Gordon Hirabayashi (1918–2012), American sociologist
- Hirabayashi Taiko (平林 たい子, 1905–1972), Japanese writer
- Asako Hirabayashi (born 1960), Asian-American contemporary composer and harpsichordist

== See also ==
- Hirabayashi v. United States (1943), a United States Supreme Court case
- Hirabayashi v. United States (1987), a case overturning conviction of Gordon Hirabayashi
- Hirabayashi Station (disambiguation), railway stations in Niigata and Osaka, Japan
- 6390 Hirabayashi, a main-belt asteroid
