= Hirabayashi v. United States (1987) =

Ninth Circuit Court of Appeals case

- Court: United States Court of Appeals for the Ninth Circuit
- Full case name: Gordon K. Hirabayashi v. United States of America; United States of America v. Gordon K. Hirabayashi
- Argued: March 2 1987
- Decided: September 24 1987
- Citation: 828 F.2d 591 (9th Cir. 1987)

Case history
- Prior history: No. C83-122V, 627 F. Supp. 1445 (W.D. Wash. 1986)

Court membership
- Judges sitting: Alfred Goodwin, Mary M. Schroeder, Joseph Jerome Farris

Case opinions
- Majority: Schroeder, joined by Goodwin, Farris

Hirabayashi v. United States, 828 F.2d 591 (9th Cir. 1987), is a case decided by the Ninth Circuit Court of Appeals and recognized for both its historical and legal significance. The case is historically significant for vacating the World War II–era convictions of Japanese American civil rights leader Gordon Hirabayashi. Those convictions were affirmed in the Supreme Court's 1943 decision Hirabayashi v. United States. The case is legally significant for establishing the standard to determine when any federal court in the Ninth Circuit may issue a writ of coram nobis.

== Gordon Hirabayashi ==
Gordon Kiyoshi Hirabayashi (April 23, 1918 – January 2, 2012) was born an American citizen in the Sand Point neighborhood of Seattle, Washington. His parents were both born in Japan, but had emigrated to the United States where they met and later married. Hirabayashi attended public schools and was active in the Boy Scouts and later in the Y.M.C.A. at the University of Washington, and he was also an active member in the Christian community. Prior his arrests during World War II, Hirabayashi had never been arrested on any charge, had never been to Japan, and had never corresponded with any Japanese in Japan.

== Opposition to Japanese American internment ==
On the morning of December 7, 1941, Japanese military planes attacked Pearl Harbor, Hawaii. Later that day, President Franklin D. Roosevelt called for a proclamation of war with the Japanese Empire and issued Presidential Proclamation No. 2525, which provided the Secretary of War broad authority to restrict the liberties of Japanese aliens. On February 19, 1942, President Roosevelt issued Executive Order No. 9066, which provided the Secretary of War (or anyone he delegated) "the authority to establish military areas from which any or all persons, citizens as well as aliens, might be excluded." The next day, Secretary of War Henry L. Stimson delegated his authority to Lieutenant General John L. DeWitt, the Commanding General of the Western Defense Command.

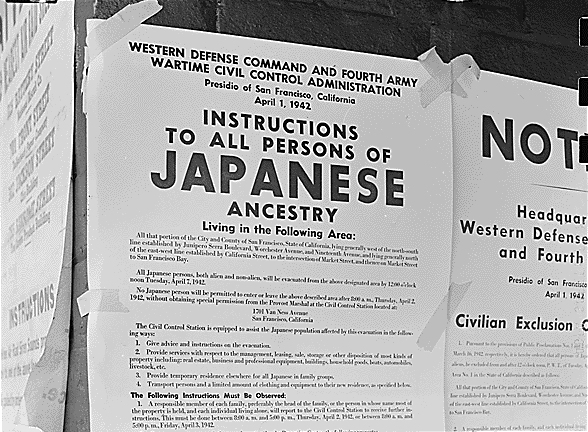
Japanese American Exclusion Order

Under the authority delegated to him, General DeWitt issued a series of Public Proclamations and Civilian Exclusion Orders. On March 24, 1942, DeWitt issued Public Proclamation No. 3, establishing a curfew in established military zones, which required "all persons of Japanese ancestry ... to remain within their place of residence between 8 p.m. and 6 a.m." On May 10, 1942, DeWitt issued Civilian Exclusion Order No. 57, which established a military zone in the area surrounding the University of Washington (where Hirabayashi both attended school and resided) and required all persons of Japanese ancestry to report within two days to a designated civilian control station as a prerequisite to exclusion from the area and assignment to an internment camp.

Hirabayashi had learned in school what was expected of him as an American citizen and what his rights were as an American citizen, so, instead of reporting to the civilian control station, he went with his attorney to the Seattle office of the FBI and turned himself in. During his interview with an FBI agent, Hirabayashi stated that as a matter of conscience he was refusing to report to a control station imposed by Exclusion Order No. 57, and that he had not abided by the curfew restrictions imposed by Public Proclamation No. 3.

On May 28, 1942, a grand jury indicted Hirabayashi on two criminal counts. The first count charged Hirabayashi with failing to report to the civilian control station pursuant to Civilian Exclusion Order 57. The second count charged Hirabayashi with the curfew violation pursuant to Public Proclamation No. 3. Hirabayashi served prison time in the King County Jail, a government labor camp in the Catalina Mountains of Arizona, and the McNeil Island Corrections Center in Washington.

The case was brought before Judge Lloyd Llewellyn Black of the United States District Court for the Western District of Washington. Hirabayashi and his attorney first petitioned Judge Black to dismiss the charges "on the grounds that [General DeWitt's] orders and proclamations involved are unconstitutional by virtue of being in violation of the Fifth Amendment". Judge Black determined that DeWitt's orders and proclamations "are not only reasonable but vitally necessary", and justified his ruling by stating:

Of vital importance in considering this question is the fact that the parachutists and saboteurs, as well as the soldiers, of Japan make diabolically clever use of infiltration tactics. They are shrewd masters of tricky concealment among any who resemble them. With the aid of any artifice or treachery they seek such human camouflage and with uncanny skill discover and take advantage of any disloyalty among their kind.

In October 1942, following Judge Black's denial of the motion to dismiss, a jury convicted Hirabayashi on both counts. On appeal, the Court of Appeals for the Ninth Circuit certified to the Supreme Court questions of law upon which it desired instructions. The Supreme Court decided to hear the appeal directly instead of addressing the questions of law and ordered that the entire record be brought to its Court.

== Supreme Court decision ==
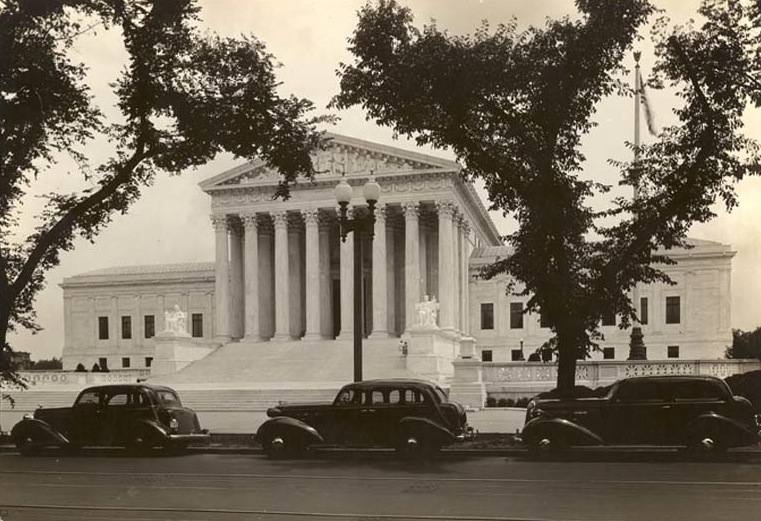
United States Supreme Court Building

On May 10 and 11, 1943, the United States Supreme Court heard oral arguments in Hirabayashi v. United States, 320 U.S. 81 (1943), to determine whether the curfew orders unconstitutionally discriminated between citizens of Japanese ancestry and those of other ancestries in violation of the Fifth Amendment. The ultimate decision before the Court was whether the restrictions were justified military decisions or were based on racial prejudice.

Hirabayashi's legal team argued that there was no evidence of any threat from Japanese Americans on the West Coast that justified a racially based classification, and that the military orders were based upon racial prejudice rather than a justified military emergency. The Justice Department, however, justified the exclusion and curfew orders because during a time of war the military did not have the time or resources to segregate the loyal from the disloyal. The government also explained that cultural characteristics of the Japanese Americans, including religion and education, made it likely that some, though not all, American citizens of Japanese ancestry were disloyal. Because of the military urgency during a time of war, the government did not wait to segregate the loyal from the disloyal. The government explained that the orders was a method of removing the unknown number of Japanese persons who might assist a Japanese invasion in a short amount of time, and it was not a program for sifting out such persons in the indefinite future.

On June 21, 1943, the Supreme Court delivered its opinion in Hirabayashi v. United States in favor of the government. Chief Justice Harlan F. Stone delivered the opinion; he was convinced that the racial classification was justifiable only as a matter of military expediency, and without evidence to the contrary, concluded the military orders were based upon military justification and not upon racial prejudice. As Justice William O. Douglas wrote in a concurring opinion: "[G]uilt is personal under our constitutional system. Detention for reasonable cause is one thing. Detention on account of ancestry is another."

== General DeWitt's report ==
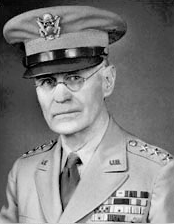
Lt Gen John DeWitt

Lieutenant General John L. DeWitt, the Commanding General of the Western Defense Command, was responsible for issuing the curfew orders and exclusion orders upon the Japanese American civilians on the United States West Coast. Thus, the Justice Department's case before the Supreme Court depended upon his orders being issued on the basis of military urgency instead of racial prejudice.

On June 5, 1943, General DeWitt issued a document entitled Final Report: Japanese Evacuation from the West Coast 1942. In this document, DeWitt explained that the orders were justified because there was a threat to highly sensitive installations where many Japanese Americans resided and time was of the essence. Furthermore, DeWitt explained that there was not a method to quickly determine the loyalties of citizens with Japanese ancestry. This document was released before the Supreme Court's decision, and it was consistent with the Justice Department's position before the Court. However, unbeknown to Hirabayashi's attorneys, there was an earlier version of DeWitt's "Final Report" which was not consistent with the Justice Department's position before the Court.

In 1978, Aiko Herzig-Yoshinaga, a Japanese American who was confined to internment camps during World War II, moved to Washington, D.C., and accepted a research position where she examined documents that had recently been made available to the public in the National Archives on the restrictions placed upon Japanese Americans. A few years into her research, she passed by the Modern Military Section of the National Archives and noticed a copy of DeWitt's "Final Report" on the desk of an archivist, and, upon examining it, recognized its wording to be different from that of the published version.

The report Herzig-Yoshinaga discovered was the first version of DeWitt's "Final Report". In this version, it was clear that key language had been changed in the final version for the purpose of maintaining consistency with the Justice Department's position before the Supreme Court. Additional documents were also recovered, and altogether, these documents provided the true purpose for the restrictions. In DeWitt's first version, he wrote that the Exclusion Orders were necessary and would continue for the duration of the war because:

It was impossible to establish the identity of the loyal and the disloyal with any degree of safety. It was not that there was insufficient time in which to make such a determination; it was simply a matter of facing the realities that a positive determination could not be made, that an exact separation of the "sheep from the goats" was unfeasible.

DeWitt's position was determined despite conflicting evidence brought to his attention. On January 14, 1943, Major General Allen W. Gullion, the Provost Marshal General, engaged in the following phone conversation with DeWitt about whether it was possible to determine the loyalty of Japanese Americans:

DeWitt: I don't see how they can determine the loyalty of a Jap by interrogation ... or investigation.

Gullion: They've got a questionnaire that the Navy—some psychologist over there in the Navy sold to them.

DeWitt: There isn't such a thing as a loyal Japanese and it is just impossible to determine their loyalty by investigation—it just can't be done ...

Additionally, on April 13, 1943, DeWitt provided a statement to the San Francisco News, indicating that prejudice dominated his thinking by saying, "It makes no difference whether the Japanese is theoretically a citizen ... A Jap is a Jap."

== District Court petition to vacate convictions ==
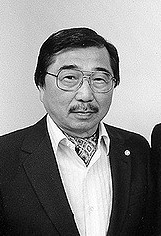
Gordon Hirabayashi in 1986

Peter Irons was a professor at the University of California at San Diego. After learning of some of the documents relating to DeWitt's orders, he called Hirabayashi, informed him of the new evidence, and advised him to reopen his case. Upon receiving the information, Hirabayashi told Irons, "I've been waiting for over forty years for this kind of phone call." Irons became Hirabayashi's legal advisor and filed a petition for a writ of coram nobis in the United States District Court for the Western District of Washington to vacate the convictions.

The petition was brought before Judge Donald S. Voorhees. The government, in its reply to Hirabayashi's petition, argued that they did not want to defend the convictions since they had been long recognized as unjust and the original orders (Executive Order 9066) and laws (Public Law 77-503) had been rescinded and repealed. But the government also asked the district court to not consider (and thereby publicize) the facts which would be required for a petition for coram nobis, and instead just dismiss the indictment to vacate the conviction. However, Judge Voorhees rejected the motion and in June 1985 presided over a two-week evidentiary hearing on the case. On February 10, 1986, he delivered his decision based upon the factual record and determined the following:

- First, that while the Supreme Court based its decision in Hirabayashi upon deference to military judgment of the need for expediency, General DeWitt, the person responsible for the racially based confinement of American citizens, had made no such judgment.
- Second, that the United States government doctored the documentary record to reflect that DeWitt had made a judgment of military exigency instead of racial prejudice.
- Third, that if the suppressed material had been submitted to the Supreme Court, its decision probably would have been different.

Judge Voorhees, therefore, granted the writ of coram nobis on Hirabayashi's conviction for failing to report to the civilian control station pursuant to Civilian Exclusion Order 57; however, he declined to grant coram nobis relief with respect to the curfew conviction. He based that decision upon his conclusion that the Supreme Court would have drawn a legal distinction between the curfew and exclusion orders. The decision would be appealed by both Hirabayashi and the government. Hirabayashi appealed Judge Voorhees's decision not to vacate his conviction for the curfew violation. The government, appealed Judge Voorhees's decision to vacate the conviction on his failure to report to the control station.

== Decision by the Ninth Circuit ==
=== Historical significance ===
On March 2, 1987, the United States Court of Appeals for the Ninth Circuit heard oral arguments in the case. The arguments were presented before Judges Alfred Goodwin, Mary M. Schroeder, and Joseph Jerome Farris. Understanding the historical significance of Hirabayashi's case, as well as a similar case of another Japanese American civil rights leader, Fred Korematsu, the Court made the following opening statement:

The Hirabayashi and Korematsu decisions have never occupied an honored place in our history. In the ensuing four and a half decades, journalists and researchers have stocked library shelves with studies of the cases and surrounding events. These materials document historical judgments that the convictions were unjust. They demonstrate that there could have been no reasonable military assessment of an emergency at the time, that the orders were based upon racial stereotypes, and that the orders caused needless suffering and shame for thousands of American citizens. The legal judgments of the courts reflecting that Hirabayashi and Korematsu had been properly convicted of violating the laws of the United States, however, remained on their records. Petitioner filed this lawsuit in 1983 to obtain a writ of error coram nobis to vacate his convictions and thus to make the judgments of the courts conform to the judgments of history.

The Ninth Circuit agreed with Judge Voorhees's factual and legal analysis leading to his vacating Hirabayashi's conviction for his failure to report to the control station; however, the Ninth Circuit disagreed with Judge Voorhees's analysis of the curfew conviction and denial to vacate Hirabayashi's conviction for violating the curfew order. Therefore, the Ninth Circuit's three-judge panel unanimously decided that both of Hirabayashi's convictions should be vacated.

=== Writ of coram nobis ===
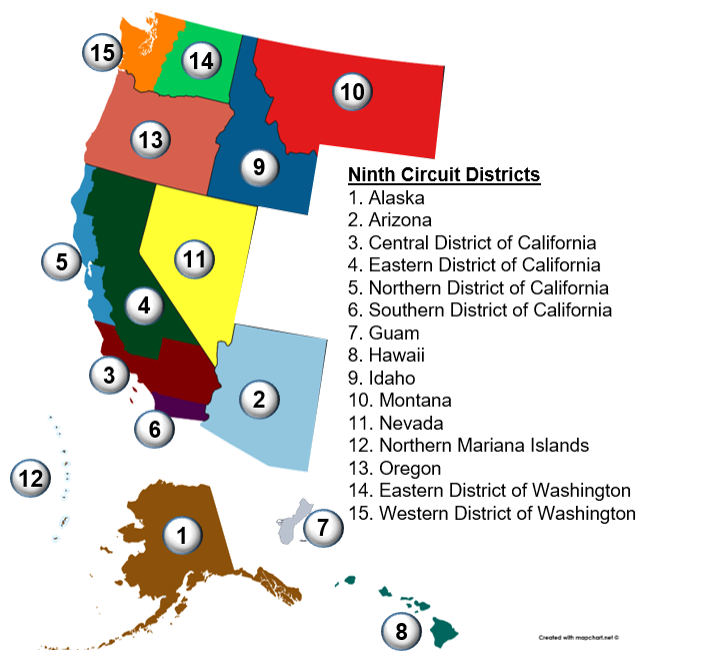
Districts of the Ninth Circuit

Although the Ninth Circuit's 1987 decision in Hirabayashi v. United States is widely known for its decision to vacate the World War II–era convictions of Japanese American civil rights leader Gordon Hirabayashi, this case is also significant for establishing the criteria required for to issue a writ of coram nobis for all federal courts within the Ninth Circuit's jurisdiction.

The writ of coram nobis is an order allowing a court to correct its original judgment upon discovery of a fundamental error that would have prevented the original judgment from being pronounced. In 1954, the Supreme Court determined in United States v. Morgan that coram nobis relief is available to challenge the validity of a federal criminal conviction, even though the sentence has been fully served. The Ninth Circuit agreed with Judge Voorhees's analysis of United States v. Morgan and provided that coram nobis petitioner must show all of the following in order to qualify for coram nobis relief:

1. A more usual remedy is not available. A federal prisoner in custody can appeal his conviction or sentence through a writ of habeas corpus (28 U.S.C. §2255). A person who is no longer in custody is not eligible for a writ of habeas corpus; therefore, there is no other usual remedy except the writ of coram nobis.
2. Valid reasons exist for not attacking the conviction earlier. A coram nobis petitioner must be able to provide new evidence that could not have discovered any earlier. The writ is not available if the grounds raised could have been raised when the petitioner was in custody.
3. Adverse consequences exist from the conviction sufficient to satisfy the case or controversy requirement of Article III. The petitioner must show that they suffer the consequences of the federal conviction. For petitioners who were convicted by a federal court in the Ninth Circuit, the Ninth Circuit has "repeatedly reaffirmed the presumption that collateral consequences flow from any criminal conviction".
4. The error is of the most fundamental character. The error to be corrected must be an error which resulted in a complete miscarriage of justice. In other words, the error is one that has rendered the proceeding itself irregular and invalid.

== See also ==
- Gordon Hirabayashi
- Internment of Japanese Americans
- Hirabayashi v. United States (1943)
- Executive Order 9066
- Coram nobis
