= Minoru Yasui =

American lawyer and activist (1916–1986)

- 安井稔
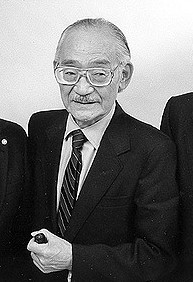
- Born: October 19, 1916; Hood River, Oregon, U.S.
- Died: November 12, 1986 (aged 70); Denver, Colorado, U.S.
- Resting place: Hood River, Oregon
- Other name: Min
- Occupation: Lawyer
- Known for: Yasui v. United States
- Spouse: True Shibata (m. 1946)
- Children: 3
- Awards: Presidential Medal of Freedom (posthumous, 2015)

Minoru Yasui (安井稔, Yasui Minoru; October 19, 1916 – November 12, 1986) was an American lawyer from Oregon. Born in Hood River, Oregon, he earned both an undergraduate degree and his law degree at the University of Oregon. He was one of the few Japanese Americans after the bombing of Pearl Harbor who fought laws that directly targeted Japanese Americans or Japanese immigrants. His case was the first case to test the constitutionality of the curfews targeted at minority groups.

Yasui's case made its way to the United States Supreme Court, where his conviction for breaking curfew was affirmed. After internment during most of World War II, he moved to Denver, Colorado in 1944. In Denver, Yasui married and became a local leader in civic affairs, including leadership positions in the Japanese American Citizens League. In 1986, his criminal conviction was overturned by the federal court.

In 2015, Senator Mazie K. Hirono nominated Yasui for the Presidential Medal of Freedom, the highest civilian award of the United States. On November 16, 2015, President Barack Obama announced that Yasui would receive a posthumous Presidential Medal of Freedom. The Medal was presented to Laurie Yasui in a White House ceremony on November 24, where he became the first Presidential Medal of Freedom winner from Oregon.

== Early life ==
Born in Hood River, Oregon, on October 19, 1916, Minoru Yasui was the son of Japanese immigrants Shidzuyo and Masuo Yasui. The third son of nine children born to this fruit-farming family, he graduated from the local high school in Hood River in 1933. At the age of eight he spent a summer in Japan, and later was enrolled in a Japanese language school in Oregon for three years. Yasui went on to college after high school at the University of Oregon in Eugene. At the school Yasui earned a bachelor's degree from the school in 1937 and a law degree from the University of Oregon Law School in 1939. He also was a member of the United States Army's Reserve Officer Training Corps (ROTC) program at the university, earning a commission after graduation in 1937. ROTC was a requirement of all male students during this time period for the first two years of the four-year program. Yasui was commissioned on December 8, 1937, as a second lieutenant in the Army's Infantry Reserve.

After law school he "was the first Japanese-American attorney admitted to the Oregon State Bar." He began practicing law in Portland, Oregon in 1939. He found it hard to find work in Portland, but through the connections of his father, he started working for the Japanese government at its consulate in Chicago, Illinois. He was employed as one of several Consular attachés at that office, mainly doing clerical work. Following the attack on Pearl Harbor, which drew the United States into World War II against Japan and Germany, Yasui resigned his position with the consulate on December 8, 1941.

== World War II ==
Yasui returned to Hood River from Chicago after his father, Masuo Yasui, requested that he come home in order to report for military duty. After returning to Hood River, he tried to report for duty with the United States Army at the Vancouver Barracks in neighboring Washington, but wasn't allowed to take up his commission on nine occasions. Masuo Yasui was arrested on December 13, 1941, by the Federal Bureau of Investigation as an enemy alien, and had his assets frozen. Minoru Yasui moved to Portland and opened a private law practice in order to help the Japanese Americans put their affairs in order. President Franklin D. Roosevelt signed Executive Order 9066 on February 19, 1942, that allowed the military to set up exclusion zones, curfews, and ultimately the internment of Japanese Americans during the war.

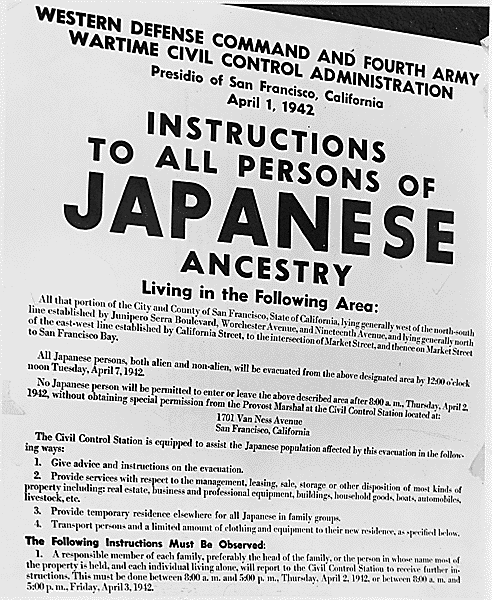
Poster of exclusion orders

On March 28, 1942, Yasui deliberately broke the military implemented curfew in Portland, by walking around the downtown area and then presenting himself at a police station after 11:00 pm in order to test the curfew's constitutionality. He first asked an officer on the street to arrest him but was told to "Run along home, sonny boy," and so he walked into the police station. Later, on bail, he learned that a grand jury had indicted him. After the notice was given for the Japanese to evacuate, Yasui notified the authorities that he had no intentions of complying, and went to his family's home in Hood River. This violated another law restricting travel of Japanese Americans, and authorities arrested him in Hood River.

Yasui had consulted a friend in the FBI prior to arrest, and consulted with other legal minds to try to test the legality of the orders. At trial he was defended by private attorney Earl Bernard. Gus J. Solomon, later a judge for the same court, had asked the national American Civil Liberties Union to defend Yasui as no local Oregon groups elected to support Yasui. One part of the strategy was to proceed with a non-jury trial, leaving the decision only to the judge. Solomon was asked by Fee to help advise the court on the issues, along with eight other attorneys. At his trial, federal judge James Alger Fee found Yasui guilty and, further, that Yasui (born in Hood River, Oregon) was not a U.S. citizen. Yasui was sentenced to one year in prison and given a $5000 fine.

Yasui waited nine months for his chance in court for appeal. During this time he was incarcerated at the Multnomah County Jail in Portland, and later sent to the Minidoka War Relocation Center in Idaho. When that chance finally came, the case went first to the Ninth Circuit briefly, but was then moved on to the Supreme Court. There the judges came to the conclusion that Yasui was still a U.S. citizen. After a few days on June 21, 1943, however, in Yasui v. United States, the court ruled unanimously that the government did have the authority to restrict the lives of civilian citizens during wartime, deciding the case as a companion case to Hirabayashi v. United States. Yasui was sent back to Fee, who removed the fine and decided that the time already served was enough of a punishment. Yasui was released and moved into the Japanese internment camps.

== Later years ==
In 1944, Yasui was allowed to leave the internment camp in the summer and was employed in Chicago before moving to Denver, Colorado, in September 1944. There he passed the bar in June 1945, but was only admitted to practice law after an appeal to the Colorado Supreme Court. The following year in November he married former internee True Shibata, and they had three daughters together, Iris, Holly, and Laurel.

Living in Denver, Yasui became involved with community relations, serving on committee set up by the mayor, and later from 1959 to 1983 on the Commission on Community Relations. This commission dealt with race relations and other social issues, with Yasui as executive director from 1967 to 1983. In 1954, he was chairman of the Japanese American Citizens League’s (JACL) district covering Colorado, Wyoming, Texas, Nebraska, New Mexico, and Montana. The Minoru Yasui Community Service Award was started in 1974 by Denver community leaders, and is awarded annually to Denver area volunteers.

In 1976, Yasui began working on the JACL's committee concerning redress for the internment during World War II. He continued on that committee until 1984, serving as its chairman in 1981. He also filed in federal district court in Oregon a coram nobis to attempt to overturn his conviction in 1984. His conviction was overturned by the Oregon federal court in 1986. Minoru Yasui died on November 12, 1986, and is buried in his hometown of Hood River.

== Legacy ==
The City and County of Denver owns an office building named after Yasui. Located at 303 West Colfax Avenue in Denver, the building is called Minoru Yasui Plaza, or the Minoru Yasui Building. A bronze bust of Yasui adorns the building's foyer.

The University of Oregon dedicated Yasui Hall in June 2024.

== See also ==
- Fred Korematsu
- Gordon Hirabayashi
- List of first minority male lawyers and judges in Oregon
