= United States v. Morgan (1954) =

- Supreme Court of the United States

Argued October 19, 1953 Decided January 4, 1954
- Full case name: United States v. Robert Patrick Morgan
- Citations: 346 U.S. 502 (more) 74 S. Ct. 247; 98 L. Ed. 248

Case history
- Prior: 202 F.2d 67 (2d Cir. 1953); cert. granted, 345 U.S. 974 (1953).

Holding
- Under the All-Writs Section, 28 U.S.C. § 1651(a), the Federal District Court had power to issue a writ of error coram nobis; it had power to vacate its judgment of conviction and sentence.

Court membership
- Chief Justice Earl Warren Associate Justices Hugo Black · Stanley F. Reed; Felix Frankfurter · William O. Douglas; Robert H. Jackson · Harold H. Burton; Tom C. Clark · Sherman Minton

Case opinions
- Majority: Reed, joined by Black, Frankfurter, Douglas, Burton
- Dissent: Minton, joined by Warren, Jackson, Clark

Laws applied
- All-Writs Section, 28 U.S.C. § 1651(a)

United States v. Morgan, 346 U.S. 502 (1954), is a landmark decision by the United States Supreme Court which provides the writ of coram nobis as the proper application to request federal post-conviction judicial review for those who have completed the conviction's incarceration in order to challenge the validity of a federal criminal conviction.

== Background ==
The ancient writ of coram nobis originated in the English judicial system during the sixteenth century. If a court discovered a factual mistake or error after the conclusion of a case, the writ could be issued by the court to correct the error. The writ of coram nobis was identical to the writ of habeas corpus; except, the writ of habeas corpus was reserved exclusively for those who were held in prisons, and the writ of coram nobis was available to everyone else.

The Judiciary Act of 1789 provided courts in the United States the authority to issue writs to achieve justice as long as the writ does not conflict with constitutional rights or legislative statutes. In 1911, the authorization of the federal judiciary to issue writs was modified into 28 U. S. C. § 1651(a) and is known as the “all-writs section of the Judicial Code”. In 1946, the writ of coram nobis was considered obsolete when Congress added Rule 60(e) to the Federal Rules of Civil Procedure which specifically abolished the writ of coram nobis in civil cases. Until this time, federal courts only used the writ of coram nobis to correct errors in federal civil cases because errors in federal criminal cases could be corrected with a writ of habeas corpus. Thus, in its 1947 decision, United States v. Smith, the Supreme Court observed “it is difficult to conceive of a situation in a federal criminal case today where [the writ of coram nobis] would be necessary or appropriate.”

Questions about whether the writ of coram nobis would be necessary or appropriate resurfaced just one year later with the Act of June 25, 1948 which codified existing federal habeas corpus statutes and provided only those individuals in-custody access to the writ of habeas corpus. Prior to the Act of June 25, 1948, the writ of habeas corpus was the sole application for United States federal courts to review convictions of those who had completed their incarceration. Following the Act of June 25, 1948, federal courts were left to decide whether the act eliminated any review of convictions for those who had completed their incarceration or whether the writ of coram nobis (which had been limited to reviews of civil cases in US federal courts) could be expanded to include reviews of criminal cases for those who had completed their incarceration.

Morgan resolved these questions by determining that those who had completed their incarceration could challenge their conviction through the writ of coram nobis. Although the Supreme Court states in Carlisle v. United States, “it is difficult to conceive of a situation in a federal criminal case today where [the writ of coram nobis] would be necessary or appropriate [for prisoners and others serving out a term of a federal conviction],” Morgan provides when the writ of coram nobis is necessary or appropriate for those who are no longer in-custody.

== Case ==
In 1939, nineteen-year-old Robert Patrick Morgan pled guilty to stealing three letters from the US Post Office and was sentenced in the United States District Court for the Northern District of New York to four years in federal prison; however, Morgan's constitutional rights were violated because he was not provided an attorney nor did he waive his constitutional right to an attorney. Unfortunately for Morgan, he was unaware that his constitutional rights were violated until after he had completed his sentence. In 1950, Morgan was convicted of attempted burglary in a New York county court. As a result of his 1939 federal conviction, the county court applied New York's Multiple Offenders Law and sentenced Morgan to seven to ten years at Attica Prison.

In 1952, Morgan first became aware of the constitutional violations related to his 1939 federal conviction. As a result, he petitioned the district court for the writ of coram nobis. If successful, his state sentence would be reduced because he would no longer be considered a multiple offender. The district court denied Morgan's petition on the ground that the coram nobis petition was to be treated as a habeas corpus petition under 28 U.S.C. § 2255, which was unavailable to Morgan because he was no longer in federal custody. Morgan appealed the district court's decision to the Second Circuit Court of Appeals. The case was argued before the appellate court on January 13, 1953. On February 5, 1953, the three-judge panel unanimously determined that Morgan was entitled to the writ of coram nobis and reversed the district court's decision. Following the appellate court's decision, the attorney's office for the United States petitioned and was granted a writ of certiorari to the Supreme Court.

== Decision ==
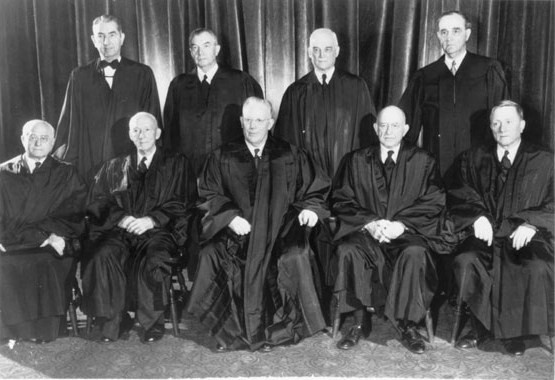
In a 5–4 decision, the United States Supreme Court held that federal courts have the authority to issue the writ of coram nobis to those who are no longer in custody.

United States v. Morgan was argued on October 19, 1953, and decided January 4, 1954. In a 5–4 decision, the Court agreed with the Second Circuit and held that federal courts have the authority under the all-writs section of the Judicial Code to issue the writ of coram nobis to those who are no longer in custody. Justice Stanley Reed wrote for the majority in Morgan, which held:

- Federal District Courts, under the authority of the All-Writs Section, 28 U.S.C. § 1651(a), may issue the writ of coram nobis.
- A motion for a writ of coram nobis “is a step in the criminal case” and “is of the same general character as a motion under 28 U.S.C. § 2255.”
- A writ of coram nobis should be allowed only under circumstances compelling such action to achieve justice.
- If no other remedy is available and sound reasons existing for failure to seek appropriate earlier relief, a motion of the writ of coram nobis must be heard by the federal court.
- Since adverse consequences resulting from the conviction persist after conclusion of a sentence, the petitioner is entitled to show that his conviction was invalid.
- The writ of coram nobis may be issued to correct a constitutional violation. Thus, Morgan broadened the writ of coram nobis, which had historically been issued only to correct errors of fact, to allow courts to also correct errors of law.

== Division of circuit courts ==
Map of the United States Courts of Appeals

Federal appellate courts are currently divided on the deadline to file an appeal of a district court's decision of a case to petition for a writ of coram nobis. Most appellate courts provide 60 days to file an appeal; two other courts provide only 10 days to file an appeal. The source of this controversy is found in footnote 4 of the Morgan decision in which the Court held the writ of coram nobis “is a step in the criminal case” and also “of the same general character as one under 28 U.S.C. § 2255.”

The Second, Fifth, Sixth, Seventh, and Tenth circuit courts held that the civil time limit should apply to coram nobis appeals because the writ of coram nobis is "of the same general character" as the writ of habeas corpus under 28 U.S.C. § 2255. Habeas corpus petitions follow time limit guidelines of the civil rule which provides a 60-day time period to file an appeal. However, the Eighth and Ninth circuit courts held that a writ of coram nobis is governed by the criminal time limit for filing appeals because it a "step in a criminal case." Criminal rules of appellate procedure only provide a 10-day time period to file an appeal.

== See also ==
- Habeas corpus in the United States
- Post conviction
