= Yasui v. United States =

- Supreme Court of the United States

Argued May 10–11, 1943 Decided June 21, 1943
- Full case name: Minoru Yasui v. United States
- Citations: 320 U.S. 115 (more) 63 S. Ct. 1392, 87 L. Ed. 1793, 1943 U.S. LEXIS 461

Case history
- Prior: U.S. v. Minoru Yasui, 48 F. Supp. 40 (D. Or. 1942); Certificate from the Circuit Court of Appeals for the Ninth Circuit
- Subsequent: United States v. Minoru Yasui, 51 F. Supp. 234 (D. Or. 1943)

Holding
- The Court held that the application of curfews against citizens was constitutional.

Court membership
- Chief Justice Harlan F. Stone Associate Justices Owen Roberts · Hugo Black; Stanley F. Reed · Felix Frankfurter; William O. Douglas · Frank Murphy; Robert H. Jackson · Wiley B. Rutledge

Case opinion
- Majority: Stone, joined by unanimous

Laws applied
- 18 U.S.C.A. s 97a Executive Order 9066; U.S. Const.

Yasui v. United States, 320 U.S. 115 (1943), was a United States Supreme Court case regarding the constitutionality of curfews used during World War II when they were applied to citizens of the United States. The case arose out of the implementation of Executive Order 9066 by the U.S. military to create zones of exclusion along the West Coast of the United States, where Japanese Americans were subjected to curfews and eventual removal to relocation centers. This Presidential order followed the attack on Pearl Harbor that brought the United States into World War II and inflamed the existing anti-Japanese sentiment in the country.

In their decision, the Supreme Court held that the application of curfews against citizens is constitutional. As a companion case to Hirabayashi v. United States, both decided on June 21, 1943, the court affirmed the conviction of U.S.-born Minoru Yasui. The court remanded the case to the district court for sentencing as the lower court had determined the curfew was not valid against citizens, but Yasui had forfeited his citizenship by working for the Japanese consulate. The Yasui and Hirabayashi decisions, along with the later Ex parte Endo and Korematsu v. United States decisions, determined the legality of the curfews and relocations during the war. In the 1980s, new information was used to vacate the conviction of Yasui.

== Background ==
On September 1, 1939, Nazi Germany invaded neighboring Poland, starting World War II. After two years of combat neutrality, the United States was drawn into the war as an active participant after the Japanese attack on Pearl Harbor on December 7, 1941. U.S. President Franklin D. Roosevelt responded to fears of a fifth column composed of Japanese-Americans by issuing Executive Order 9066 on February 19, 1942. This executive order authorized the military to create zones of exclusion, which were then used to relocate predominantly those of Japanese heritage from the West Coast to internment camps inland. On March 23, 1942, General John L. DeWitt, commander of the Western Defense Command, set restrictions on aliens and Japanese-Americans including a curfew from 8:00 pm to 6:00 am.

Minoru Yasui was born in 1916 in Hood River, Oregon, where he graduated from high school in 1933. He then graduated from the University of Oregon in 1937, and that college’s law school in 1939. Yasui, U.S. Army reservist, then began working at the Japanese Consulate in Chicago, Illinois, in 1940, remaining there until December 8, 1941, when he then resigned and returned to Hood River. On March 28, 1942, he deliberately broke the military implemented curfew in Portland, Oregon, by walking around the downtown area and then presenting himself at a police station after 11:00 pm in order to test the curfew’s constitutionality.

On June 12, 1942, Judge James Alger Fee of the United States District Court for the District of Oregon began presiding over the non-jury trial of Yasui, the first case challenging the curfew to make it to court. The trial was held at the Federal Courthouse in Portland. Fee determined in his ruling issued on November 16, 1942, that the curfew could only apply to aliens, as martial law had not been imposed by the government. However, he also ruled that because Yasui had worked for the Japanese government he had forfeited his citizenship, so that the curfew did apply to him. Fee sentenced Yasui to one year in jail, which was served at the Multnomah County Jail, and $5,000 fine. This federal court decision with constitutional and war power issues made news around the country.

Yasui then appealed his conviction to the United States Court of Appeals for the Ninth Circuit. After arguments in the case were filed, the court certified two question to the Supreme Court of the United States. The Supreme Court then ordered the entire case be decided by that court, removing the case from further consideration by the Ninth Circuit.

== Decision ==
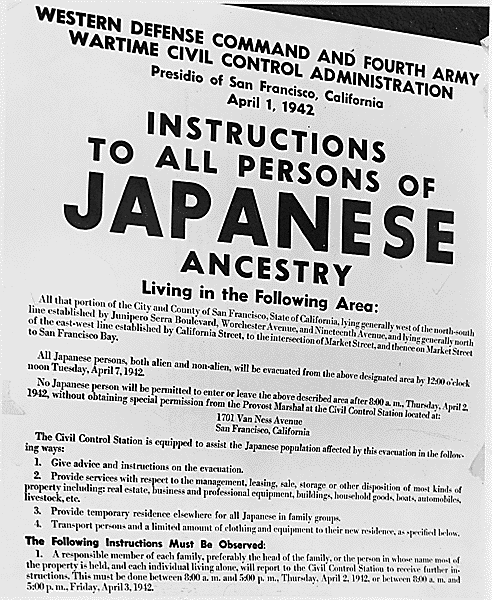
Poster of exclusion orders regarding Japanese-Americans

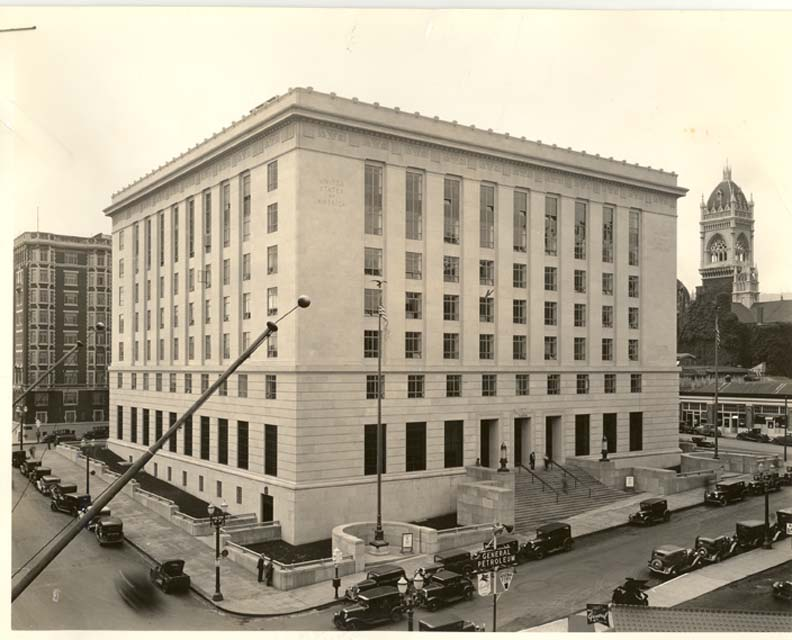
Old federal courthouse in Portland, Oregon

The Supreme Court heard arguments in the case on May 10 and May 11, 1943, with Charles Fahy arguing the case for the United States as Solicitor General . Min’s defense team included E. F. Bernard from Portland and A. L. Wirin from Los Angeles. On June 21, 1943, the court issued its decision in the case along with the Hirabayashi v. United States case.

Citing Hirabayashi, Chief Justice Stone wrote the opinion of the court, and determined that the curfew and exclusion orders were valid, even as applied to citizens of the United States. Stone’s opinion was three pages and did not contain any concurring opinions or dissents, while the Hirabayashi decision had thirty-four pages and two concurring opinions. In Yasui the court affirmed his conviction of the misdemeanor, but ordered re-sentencing since the lower court had determined that the curfew was not valid, and that Yasui had forfeited his citizenship. The Supreme Court remanded (returned) the case back to the district court to determine a sentence in light of these circumstances.

== Aftermath ==
Once the case returned to Judge Fee, he revised his earlier opinion to strike out the ruling that Yasui was no longer a United States citizen. Fee also removed the fine and reduced the sentence to 15 days, with the time already served. Yasui was released and moved into the Japanese internment camps.

Korematsu v. United States was decided the next year and overshadowed both the Yasui and Hirabayashi cases. The decisions were questioned by legal scholars even before the war had ended. Criticism has included the racist aspects of the cases and the later discovery that officials in the United States Department of Justice lied to the court at the time of the trial.

On February 1, 1983, Yasui petitioned the Oregon federal district court for a writ of error coram nobis due to the discovery of the falsehoods promulgated by the Department of Justice. This writ is only available to people who have already completed their imprisonment, and can only be used to challenge factual errors from the case. Yasui claimed in his writ that the government withheld evidence at the original trial concerning the threat of a Japanese attack on the United States mainland. The court dismissed the original indictment and conviction against Yasui, as well as the petition for the writ on request by the government. Yasui, then appealed the decision to dismiss the petition, but the Ninth Circuit Court of Appeals dismissed the appeal on procedural grounds. However, the Ninth Circuit ultimately did vacate Hirabayashi's conviction, thereby impliedly vindicating Yasui as well. In 2011, the U.S. Solicitor General's office publicly confessed the Justice Department's 1943 ethical lapse in the Supreme Court. Minoru Yasui died on November 12, 1986.

Lawyers who represented Fred Korematsu, Gordon Hirabayashi, and Minoru Yasui in successful efforts in lower federal courts to nullify their convictions for violating military curfew and exclusion orders sent a letter dated January 13, 2014 to Solicitor General Donald Verrilli Jr. In light of the appeal proceedings before the U.S. Supreme in Hedges v. Obama, the lawyers asked Verrili to request the Supreme Court overrule its decisions in Korematsu (1943), Hirabayashi (1943) and Yasui (1943). If the Solicitor General should not make the request, the lawyers asked that the federal government to make clear the federal government "does not consider the internment decisions as valid precedent for governmental or military detention of individuals or groups without due process of law [...]."

== See also ==
- List of United States Supreme Court cases, volume 320
