= Coram nobis =

Court procedure used to correct grave errors

A writ of coram nobis (also writ of error coram nobis, writ of coram vobis, or writ of error coram vobis (Note: This specific use of "writ of error" is not to be confused with the archaic, generic use of "writ of error" for what might now be called an "appeal as of right" or an "appellate petition.")) is a legal order allowing a court to correct its original judgment upon discovery of a fundamental error that did not appear in the records of the original judgment's proceedings and that would have prevented the judgment from being pronounced.

In the United Kingdom, the common law writ is superseded by the Common Law Procedure Act 1852 (15 & 16 Vict. c. 76) and the Criminal Appeal Act 1907 (7 Edw. 7. c. 23).

The writ survives in the United States in federal courts, in the courts of sixteen states, and the District of Columbia courts. Each state has its own coram nobis procedures. A writ of coram nobis can be granted only by the court where the original judgment was entered, so those seeking to correct a judgment must understand the criteria required for that jurisdiction.

== Terminology ==
A writ is an official written command, while a writ of error provides a superior court the means to correct errors of a lower court. A writ of error coram nobis is a variation of the writ of error providing a court with the means to correct its own errors. "Coram nobis" is Latin for "before us". Initially, when the Lord Chancellor issued orders on behalf of the King and the royal court, the word "us" referred to the King, the Lord Chancellor, and other judges of the royal court. The meaning of its full form, quae coram nobis resident, is "which [things] remain in our presence".

Over time, the authority to issue writs shifted from the Lord Chancellor to the courts. Although the King was no longer part of the court issuing the writ, the name "coram nobis" continued because courts associated the name with its function rather than its original Latin meaning. Thus, in English law, the definition of "coram nobis" evolved and is now redefined as a remedy for a court to correct its own error.

== History ==
The writ of coram nobis originated in the courts of common law in the English legal system during the thirteenth century. The writ of coram nobis still exists today in a few courts in the United States, where it applies only to criminal proceedings, not civil ones. King Richard declared coram nobis was allowed.

=== Common law ===
In English common law, a "petition of error" requested higher courts to review the legality of an order or sentence (similar to what is now known as an appeal). The writ of error was an original writ which began a legal proceeding (other writs were issued during proceedings). Petitioners brought a petition of error before the Lord Chancellor. If a lower court committed an error of law, the Lord Chancellor would issue a writ of error. A writ of error required the lower court to deliver the "record" of the case to a superior court where the court reviewed the case for legal errors. Because a writ of error was only available for a higher court to determine if a lower court committed an error of law, courts needed another type of writ to correct its own decision upon an error of fact. To rectify this issue, the Lord Chancellor created a new writ – the writ of error coram nobis. Thus, the original writ of coram nobis provided the means to correct errors that the writ of error could not correct. Unlike the writ of error, the writ of coram nobis:

1. corrected only factual errors that were not raised in the original case proceedings,
2. allowed the same court that presided over the original case to correct its own error, and
3. required the original case records to remain with the court that presided over the original case.

==== Abolition in English courts ====
The first case involving the writ of coram nobis is unknown due to incomplete historical records prior to the sixteenth century; however, the first recorded case involving the writ of coram nobis occurred in 1561 in the case of Sir Gilbert Debenham and Another v. Bateman.

Until 1705, the writ of error was originally a matter entirely up to the discretion of either the monarch or those with the authority to make decisions on behalf of the monarch; but in 1705, the court held that the writ was a matter of right instead of a matter of discretion. Despite making writs of error a matter of right, courts rarely used these writs because of their cumbersome and impractical procedure. A writ of error moved the record from the original court to a higher court; however, the record only contained information on the arraignment, the plea, the issue, and the verdict. The record did not include the most material parts of a trial, including the evidence and the judge's direction to the jury.

As a result, England abolished all writs of error, including the writs of coram nobis and coram vobis, and replaced them with appellate procedures encompassing all rights previously available through these writs. Thus, the abolition of the writ of coram nobis in England was due mostly to administration difficulties with the writ of error, and not because of administration difficulties with the writ of coram nobis itself.

The law abolishing the writ in civil cases was section 148 of the Common Law Procedure Act 1852. The law abolishing the writ in criminal cases was section 20 of the Criminal Appeal Act 1907.

=== United States ===
After arriving in North America in the seventeenth century, English settlers established English colonies. Within these colonies, the settlers created colonial courts that adhered to the English legal system and issued writs in the same manner as English courts. After the United States obtained independence from England, state governments, as well as the federal government, provided courts the authority to continue to rely upon writs as a source of law unless issuing the writ violated the state or federal constitution or if either the state or federal government subsequently enacted a statute restricting the writ. The purpose of allowing courts to issue writs was to fill a void whenever the state constitution, state statutes, the U.S. Constitution or federal statutes did not address an issue to be decided before the court. Writs were especially important when the federal government, as well as each state, first established its judicial system. During those times, there were very few (if any) statutes or case laws for courts to rely upon as guidance. In those circumstances, the English writs provided fledgling federal and state courts an important source of law. Over time, writs became significantly less important as Congress and state legislatures enacted more statutes and further defined rules for its judiciary. Writs also evolved independently in the federal judicial system and each state's judicial system so that a writ within one judicial systems may have a vastly different purpose and procedures from the same writ in other judicial systems. Different characteristics of a writ from one judicial system to another is the result of the federal system of government prescribed within the United States Constitution. Federalism in the United States is a mixed system of government that combines a national federal government and state governments. While federal courts are superior to state courts in federal matters, the Constitution limits the reach of federal courts; thereby, providing state courts general sovereignty and law-making authority over a wider range of topics. This sovereignty allows each judicial system to decide whether to adopt writs and the function and purpose of each writ it adopts. Thus, the use and application of writs, including the writ of coram nobis, can vary within each of these judicial systems.

Legislation authorizes a judicial system to issue the writ of coram nobis under one of two conditions:

1. Where legislation permits courts to issue writs, but the legislation does not specifically mention the writ of coram nobis. Courts throughout the United States generally have the authority to issue writs whenever the constitution or statutes encompassing a court's jurisdiction do not address an issue before the court and issuance of the writ is necessary to achieve justice. This authority was especially important for earlier courts when there were few statutes or case law to rely upon. Over time, legislatures enacted statutes encompassing almost all issues that could arise before a court. As a result, courts today rarely need to rely on writs as a source of law to address an issue not covered by statute. One example of a rare issue where courts have the occasion to issue the writ of coram nobis is the issue of former federal prisoners who have new information and this new information would have resulted in a different verdict if the information had been available at the time of trial. Whenever this specific issue comes before a federal court, there is no federal statute that specifically guides or regulates how the court must proceed; however, federal courts have determined that the writ of coram nobis is the proper vehicle to achieve justice under this specific issue.
2. Where legislation specifically permits courts to issue, by name, the writ of coram nobis. The use of writs in the United States is more common when legislation has authorized a writ by name and regulated its use by courts. For earlier courts, the practice of issuing writs was an integral part of the judicial system's proceedings. Therefore, when legislatures enacted laws to regulate issues associated with writs, some legislatures adopted the exact name of the writ within its rules while other legislatures chose to abolish the names of the writ but provided an alternative remedy under a different name. Tennessee is an example of a state where its legislature enacted a statute expressly authorizing courts to issue, by name, the "Writ of Error Coram Nobis" and regulated how this writ should be issued. In contrast, other states replaced the writ of coram nobis with other post-conviction remedies. For example, the Pennsylvania legislature enacted a law on January 25, 1966, that expressly abolished the name "writ of coram nobis" and enacted the state's Post Conviction Relief Act, which is now the sole means for obtaining post-conviction relief.

== Coram nobis in United States federal courts ==
In 1789, Congress passed the Judiciary Act to establish the judicial courts in the United States. This act also allows courts to issue writs, including the writ of coram nobis. Originally, federal courts applied the writ of coram nobis only to correct technical errors, such as those made by a clerk of the court in the records of the proceedings. The 1914 Supreme Court case United States v. Mayer expanded the scope of the writ of coram nobis to include fundamental errors, but the Court declined in this case to decide whether federal courts are permitted to issue the writ of coram nobis. In 1954, the Supreme Court determined in United States v. Morgan that federal courts are permitted to issue the writ of coram nobis to correct fundamental errors, such as those where discovery of new information is sufficient to prove a convicted felon is actually innocent. Since the Morgan case, federal courts traditionally issue a writ of coram nobis whenever a former federal prisoner petitions the original sentencing court to set aside the conviction based upon new information that was not available when the petitioner was in custody and where this new information demonstrates that the conviction was a result of a fundamental error.

=== History of the writ of coram nobis in federal courts from 1789 to 1954 ===
==== The Judiciary Act of 1789 ====
The history of the writ of coram nobis in United States federal courts began in 1789 when Congress enacted the Judiciary Act. Under Section 14 of the Judiciary Act, federal courts have the authority to issue a writ whenever the court deems it necessary to achieve justice and whenever no congressional law covers the issues before the court. This section was known as the "All-Writs Provision" of the Judiciary Act until 1948 when it became more commonly known as the "All-Writs Act" after Congress modified the Judicial Code and consolidated this provision into 28 U.S.C. § 1651. Under the All Writs Act, federal district courts have the "power to issue writs of scire facias, habeas corpus, and all other writs not specifically provided for by statute". Congress had not specifically provided by statute the authority for federal courts to issue a writ of coram nobis; therefore, the All Writs Act provides federal courts this authority.

The first case in a federal court to address the writ of coram nobis was Strode v. The Stafford Justices in 1810. In this case, the Supreme Court Chief Justice John Marshall wrote the opinion in this Circuit Court case and held that the writ of coram nobis is distinguishable from the writ of error and therefore not subject to the writ of error's statute of limitations. The first Supreme Court case mentioning the writ of coram nobis (using the term coram vobis) is the 1833 case, Pickett's Heirs v. Legerwood. In this case, the Court determined that the writ was available to correct its own errors, but the same remedy was also available using the preferred method of submitting a motion to the court. Eighty years later, in 1914, the Supreme Court reached a similar conclusion in United States v. Mayer. Thus, while federal courts confirmed the writ of coram nobis was available to federal courts, this remedy was rarely necessary or appropriate in federal courts throughout the nineteenth century for the following two reasons:

1. Courts generally considered the writ of coram nobis to be restricted to correct only technical errors, such as discovery of a defendant being under age, evidence that a defendant died before the verdict, or errors made by the court clerk in the recording of the proceedings.
2. Petitioners could raise a "motion to amend" to correct most of errors also corrected by the writ of coram nobis. Although courts recognized that the writ of coram nobis could also reverse the judgement on such defects, the preferred practice was to present the court with a motion to amend.

==== 1946 amendments to the Rules of Civil Procedure ====
In 1946, Congress amended the Federal Rules of Civil Procedure and specifically abolished the writ of coram nobis in federal civil cases. Prior to enactment of these amendments, Congress reviewed all relief previously provided for civil cases through the writ of coram nobis and adopted those avenues of relief into the rules, thereby obviating the writ in federal civil cases. In the amendment, Congress expressly abolished the writ of coram nobis in Rule 60(b). Later, in 2007, Congress restructured the format of Rule 60, and moved the language expressly abolishing the writ of coram nobis in civil proceedings from Rule 60(b) to Rule 60(e) in the Federal Rules of Civil Procedure.

=== History of post-conviction remedies available to former federal prisoners from 1789 to 1954 ===
==== Post-conviction remedies for former federal prisoners prior to 1867 ====
In 1790, one year after Congress passed the Judiciary Act establishing federal courts, Congress enacted the Crimes Act which created the first comprehensive list of federal offenses. From 1790 until 1867, there are few, if any, records of individuals challenging a federal criminal conviction after completion of the prison sentence. Two primary reasons explain the absence of any challenges to a conviction by former federal prisoners:

1. The Crimes List provided only twenty-three federal crimes. Seven of these crimes, including treason and murder, were punishable by death. In comparison, today there are approximately 3,600 to 4,500 federal statutes that impose criminal punishments and an estimated 500,000 former federal prisoners. Despite this large population, recent cases where a former federal prisoner is able to find new information sufficient to reverse the conviction are exceedingly rare. Thus, the chances of this type of case arising prior to 1867, when the federal prison population was significantly smaller, are even more remote.
2. There were few collateral consequences stemming from a conviction at this time. Generally, the reason former convicted felons seek a writ of coram nobis is to eliminate collateral consequences ensuing from the challenged conviction. Collateral consequences are indirect consequences of a conviction, like loss of voting privileges, loss of professional licenses, inability to qualify for some employment and housing opportunities, and damage to the person's reputation. While direct consequences of a conviction are usually issued by a judge in the sentencing phase of a case (such as a prison sentence, probation, fines and restitution); indirect consequences of a conviction are not contained within a court sentence.

==== The Habeas Corpus Act of 1867 ====
The American Civil War is historically significant with respect to the rights of former federal prisoners in two ways. First, Congress enacted the Habeas Corpus Act of 1867 to prevent abuses following the civil war. This act expanded the writ of habeas corpus to any person, including former prisoners. Second, states began imposing more collateral consequences upon those convicted of crimes; thus, providing more reasons why a person would want to have a wrongful conviction overturned. The loss of voting privileges was one of the most significant collateral consequences of a felony conviction. In 1800, no state prohibited convicted felons from voting; but by the end of the U.S. Civil War, nearly 80% of state legislatures had passed laws barring felons the right to vote.

Slavery was legal in the United States until the 1860s. In the 1860 U.S. presidential election, Republicans led by Abraham Lincoln, supported the elimination of slavery. This controversial issue was the catalyst for the American Civil War, which occurred from 1861–1865. On March 3, 1865, President Lincoln signed a joint resolution declaring wives and children of persons in the armed forces to be free. On December 18, 1865, the Thirteenth Amendment to the United States Constitution, which abolished slavery and involuntary servitude in the United States except "as a punishment for crime whereof the party shall have been duly convicted," became effective. The purpose of the Habeas Corpus Act was to provide "what legislation is necessary to enable the courts of the United States to enforce the freedom of the wife and children of soldiers of the United States, and also to enforce the liberty of all persons".

The Habeas Corpus Act of 1867 expanded the jurisdiction of the writ of habeas corpus to "any person". In the 1869 case Ex parte McCardle, the Supreme Court implied that the act had no custody requirements. The court said that the act "is of the most comprehensive character. It brings within the habeas corpus jurisdiction of every court and of every judge every possible case of privation of liberty contrary to the National Constitution, treaties, or laws. It is impossible to widen this jurisdiction." The court's interpretation of this act seemed to eliminate the writ of coram nobis in criminal cases because any person challenging a conviction, regardless of whether the person is in prison or not, could have raised the claim through the writ of habeas corpus.

Although the act expanded habeas jurisdiction to "any person", it also required that an application for the writ include "facts concerning the detention of the party applying, [and] in whose custody he or she is detained". In the 1885 case Wales v. Whitney, the Supreme Court read these application requirements as an intent by Congress to restrict the writ of habeas corpus to only those who were physically restrained in jail. Thus, the court again foreclosed the writ of habeas corpus to those no longer in custody. However, in the 1973 case Hensley v. Municipal Court, San Jose – Milpitas Judicial Dist., Santa Clara County, the Court overruled this decision, calling the Wales v. Whitney jurisdictional limitation a "manacle" of the habeas corpus statute and an "arcane and scholastic procedural requirement". The Hensley court then held that the Wales v. Whitney interpretation of the custody requirements "may no longer be deemed controlling"'. Since Hensley, no court has reconsidered whether the Habeas Corpus Act applies to former prisoners.

=== United States v. Morgan (1954) provides writ of coram nobis to former federal prisoners ===
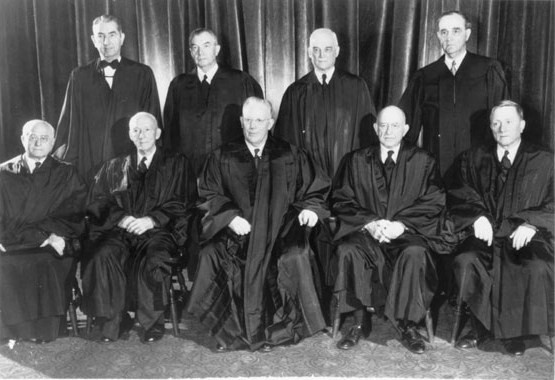
In 1954, the United States Supreme Court held in United States v. Morgan that federal courts have the authority to issue the writ of coram nobis to those who are no longer in custody.

In 1948, Congress passed legislation that would lead to the official recognition of the writ of coram nobis in federal courts. The Act of June 25, 1948 combined two pieces of legislation:

1. Congress passed the Act to organize all laws of the United States into a single source of reference, known as the United States Code (abbreviated U.S.C.). Any law (or statute) ever passed by Congress can be found in the United States Code. The U.S.C. is divided into 50 titles. Within each title is a chapter, and within each chapter is a section. For example, one of the titles created in the Act was Title 28 – Judiciary and Judicial Procedure. Chapter 153 of this title is the chapter on Habeas Corpus. Section 2255 of this title is the section providing how prisoners can challenge a conviction. In legal documents, this section is commonly abbreviated 28 U.S.C. §2255.
2. Congress passed the Act to solve a problem with habeas corpus petitions. The Habeas Corpus Act of 1867 instructed prisoners to file a writ of habeas corpus with the district court whose territory included the prison. For example, those imprisoned at Alcatraz Island, California, were required to file a writ of habeas corpus in the United States District Court for the Northern District of California, even if the prisoner's conviction and sentence originated from a federal court in another district or state. This rule led to administrative difficulties, especially for the five district courts whose territorial jurisdiction included major federal prisons. The Act of June 25, 1948 codified existing federal habeas corpus statutes and judicial habeas practice at 28 U.S.C. §2255 and changed the jurisdiction from the district of confinement to the district of sentence; however, the jurisdictional change was the only change Congress intended.

The Act of June 25, 1948 reworded the habeas corpus sections of the United States Code to provide only those individuals in custody (as a result of a criminal conviction in federal court) access to the writ of habeas corpus. For those who had been convicted of a federal crime but were no longer in custody, the question was whether the 1948 Act abolished all post-conviction review of a former prisoner's conviction.

In 1952 Robert Morgan, a former federal prisoner who had completed his sentence, petitioned to have his conviction overturned based on information he claimed to be unavailable at the time of his conviction. The district court denied his petition because Morgan was no longer in custody for the conviction he sought to overturn. Morgan appealed that decision. In 1953, the appellate court disagreed with the district court and determined that the writ of coram nobis was available to Morgan. The government appealed the appellate court's decision to the US Supreme Court.

The first question in United States v. Morgan was whether Congress intended to abolish any post-conviction remedies to former prisoners when it restricted the writ of habeas corpus to prisoners only. If the Supreme Court decided that Congress did not intend to abolish any post-conviction remedies to former prisoners, then the second question in United States v. Morgan was whether the writ of coram nobis was available to challenge a conviction after completion of the petitioner's sentence. On January 4, 1954, the Supreme Court announced its decision. The Court first determined that Congress did not intend within the 1948 Act to eliminate all reviews of criminal convictions for petitioners who had completed their sentence. Although the 1948 Act restricted former prisoners from challenging a conviction with a writ of habeas corpus, the Court determined by reviewing the legislative notes that Congress did not intend to abolish post-conviction challenges to a sentence from former prisoners. Justice Stanley Reed, who authored the majority opinion for the Court, wrote;

[T]he purpose of § 2255 was "to meet practical difficulties" in the administration of federal habeas corpus jurisdiction. ... Nowhere in the history of Section 2255 do we find any purpose to impinge upon prisoners' rights of collateral attack upon their convictions. We know of nothing in the legislative history that indicates a different conclusion. We do not think that the enactment of § 2255 is a bar to this motion, and we hold that the District Court has power to grant [the writ of coram nobis].

Although Congress did restrict the writ of habeas corpus to prisoners, the Court determined that the All Writs Act provides federal courts the authority to issue a writ of coram nobis to former prisoners whenever new evidence proves the underlying conviction was a result of a fundamental error. Thus, Morgan officially recognized the writ of coram nobis as the sole means for post-incarceration judicial review of federal convictions.

=== Source of rules and procedures governing coram nobis proceedings ===
United States v. Morgan provides broad, general guidance to courts on the rules and procedures in coram nobis proceedings, but since the Morgan case in 1954, the Supreme Court and Congress seldom provide lower courts additional guidance. Thus, Appellate courts generally fill in the gaps and provide guidance for rules and procedures unclarified by Congress and the Supreme Court; however, the interpretations of rules and procedures of coram nobis may differ in each appellate court. Thus, for a former federal prisoner who is attempting to decide whether to file a petition for the writ of coram nobis, it is necessary to understand the source of the rules and procedures.

The United States Constitution is the supreme law of the United States. Article One of the Constitution creates the legislature and provides Congress the means to create and enact laws. Article Three of the Constitution creates the judiciary and provides courts the means to interpret laws. Other than the writ of habeas corpus, the Constitution has no language permitting or restricting courts from issuing specific writs, including the writ of coram nobis.

==== Congressional enactments ====
The United States Congress enacts laws or statutes, and codifies these statutes in the United States Code. In contrast to the writ of habeas corpus, Congress has seldom enacted statutes regulating the writ of coram nobis. Statutes enacted by Congress regulating the writ of coram nobis are:

- In 1789, Congress enacted the Judicial Act. The All Writs Act section of the Judiciary Act provides federal courts the authority to issue "all writs necessary or appropriate in aid of their respective jurisdictions and agreeable to the usages and principles of law". The All Writs Act gives courts the ability to decide which specific writs utilized in English courts are available and appropriate in U.S. federal courts. While Congress provides federal courts the authority to issue writs, it does not provide courts the authority to issue specific writs by name, such as writs of mandamus or writs of coram nobis. The code for the All Writs Act is 28 U.S.C. § 1651.
- In 1946, Congress amended the Federal Rules of Civil Procedure to abolish the writ of coram nobis in federal civil cases. Prior to enacting this statute, Congress reviewed all issues previously addressed by federal courts in writ of coram nobis proceedings, and incorporated remedies for those issues within the procedures. Rule 60(e) of this Procedure originated from this statute and states, "The following are abolished: bills of review, bills in the nature of bills of review, and writs of coram nobis, coram vobis, and audita querela."
- In 2002, Congress enacted Rule 4(a)(1)(C) of the Federal Rules of Appellate Procedure to resolve a conflict among the federal appellate courts regarding the time limitations to file an appeal from an order granting or denying an application for a writ of error coram nobis. Prior to this amendment, the federal appellate courts were divided on whether coram nobis appeals have a 10-day time limit or a 60-day time limit. Rule 4(a)(1)(C) resolved the conflict and established a 60-day time limit to file the notice of appeal from a district court's judgement in a coram nobis proceeding.

==== United States Supreme Court decisions ====
Following the Constitution and Congressional statutes, the next highest source for direction and guidance of rules and procedures is the United States Supreme Court. The Supreme Court is the highest federal court. Lower courts, such as federal appellate courts and federal district courts, must follow the decisions of the Supreme Court. The Supreme Court has discretionary appellate jurisdiction, meaning the Court chooses to hear cases for reasons it deems "compelling reasons" (such as resolving a conflict in the interpretation of a federal law or resolving an important matter of law). Federal courts, including the Supreme Court, cannot override any law enacted by Congress unless the law violates the Constitution. Federal courts also cannot repeal a statute unless Congress clearly intended to repeal the statute. In 1954, United States v. Morgan provides writ of coram nobis to former federal prisoners. The Court determined coram nobis relief "should be allowed ... only under circumstances compelling such action to achieve justice". Specifically, the circumstances must include all three of these conditions:

- to remedy errors "of the most fundamental character"
- when "no other remedy [is] then available"
- "sound reasons [exist] for failure to seek appropriate earlier relief".

Since 1954, the Supreme Court granted review of only one other coram nobis case. In 2009, the Court clarified that Article I military courts have jurisdiction to entertain coram nobis petitions to consider allegations that an earlier judgment of conviction was flawed in a fundamental respect. Other than providing military courts the authority to issue the writ, the Supreme Court has declined to provide federal courts additional guidance in coram nobis proceedings. Appellate courts have occasionally criticized the Supreme Court for failing to provide this additional guidance. The Seventh Circuit called the writ of coram nobis, "a phantom in the Supreme Court's cases" and contends "Two ambiguous decisions on the subject in the history of the Supreme Court are inadequate." The Sixth Circuit took a similar stance saying, "The Supreme Court has decided only one coram nobis case in the last forty-two years, Morgan, and that opinion is ambiguous concerning whether proof of an ongoing civil disability is required." The First Circuit wrote that its decision of time limitations "derives from the Morgan Court's cryptic characterization of coram nobis as a 'step in the criminal case'". In another case, the First Circuit writes, "The metes and bounds of the writ of coram nobis are poorly defined and the Supreme Court has not developed an easily readable roadmap for its issuance."

Map of the geographic boundaries of the various United States Courts of Appeals and United States District Courts

==== Federal courts of appeals decisions ====
While the United States Supreme Court is the highest court in the United States federal court system, the United States courts of appeals, or circuit courts, are the intermediate appellate courts. There are thirteen U.S. courts of appeals. Eleven courts of appeals are numbered First through Eleventh and have geographical boundaries of various sizes. For example, the Fifth Circuit Court of Appeals consists of all federal courts in only three states: Louisiana, Mississippi and Texas, while the Ninth Circuit Court of Appeals consists of nine western states and two U.S. territories. There is also a Court of Appeals for the District of Columbia and a Court of Appeals for the Federal Circuit. Other tribunals also have "Court of Appeals" in their titles, such as the Court of Appeals for the Armed Forces, which hears appeals in court-martial cases.

Congressional statutes and Supreme Court decisions are controlling over courts of appeals. Absent statutory rules or Supreme Court case law, a court of appeals decision establishes a binding precedent for the courts in its circuit; however, a court of appeals decision is not binding for courts in other circuits. Generally, when a court of appeals hears an issue raised for the first time in that court, it arrives at the same conclusion as other courts of appeals on identical issues raised before those courts. However, whenever the courts of appeals arrive at different conclusions on the same issue, it creates a "circuit split". The Supreme Court receives thousands of petitions each year, but only agrees to hear fewer than 100 of these cases. One of the most compelling reasons for the Supreme Court to accept a case is to resolve a circuit split. Currently, a circuit split exists in coram nobis cases involving the definition of "adverse consequences". The Supreme Court determined in United States v. Morgan that a petition for a writ of coram nobis must demonstrate that adverse consequences exist from the criminal conviction. Some courts of appeals determined adverse consequences occur with any collateral consequence of a conviction while other courts of appeals have limited "adverse consequences" to only a few collateral consequences of a conviction.

==== Federal district court decisions ====
District courts must abide by congressional statutes, Supreme Court decisions, and decisions of the court of appeals in the federal judicial circuit in which the district court is located. Whenever a district court hears an issue that is not specifically addressed by statute or by case law of a higher court, district courts often "develop the record". In case of an appeal, the higher courts have the district court's reasoned decision as guidance. A developed record not only greatly facilitates the process of appellate review but also ensures that the district court has carefully considered the issues and applied the applicable law.

=== Criteria for the writ ===
==== Rules for petitioners ====
Writs of coram nobis are rare in U.S. federal courts due to the stringent criteria for issuance of the writ. Morgan established the following criteria required in a coram nobis petition in order for a federal court to issue the writ:

- A petition for a writ of coram nobis is a collateral attack on a judgment in a federal criminal case. A "collateral attack" is defined as an attack on a judgment in a proceeding other than a direct appeal.
- A petition for a writ of coram nobis in a federal court must seek to vacate a federal criminal conviction. A writ of coram nobis is not available in federal courts to challenge a conviction in a state court. The federal government operates its own coram nobis procedures independent from state courts. Those seeking to attack a state judgment must follow the post-conviction remedies offered by that state. A writ of coram nobis is also not available for civil cases. Federal Rule of Civil Procedure 60(b) specifically abolished the writ of coram nobis in civil cases.
- A petition for a writ of coram nobis may only be filed after a sentence has been served and the petitioner is no longer in custody. A person who is on probation is considered "in custody". Anyone filing a coram nobis petition while in custody will have their petition either denied for lack of jurisdiction or categorized as a petition for a writ of habeas corpus pursuant to 28 U.S.C. § 2255 (or successive 28 U.S.C. § 2255 if the petitioner has previously filed a § 2255 petition).
- A petition for a writ of coram nobis must be addressed to the sentencing court. To challenge a conviction, the petitioner must send a request for a writ of coram nobis to the court clerk of the district court where the petitioner's conviction originated. In other words, a petitioner must request for the writ in the sentencing court, rather than any convenient federal court.
- A petition for a writ of coram nobis must provide valid reasons for not attacking the conviction earlier. Petitioners need to show "reasonable diligence", where legitimate justifications exist for not raising challenges to their convictions sooner or through more usual channels (such as a § 2255 petition while in custody). A delay may be considered reasonable when the applicable law was recently changed and made retroactive, when new evidence was discovered that the petitioner could not reasonably have located earlier, or when the petitioner was improperly advised by counsel not to pursue habeas relief.
- A petition for a writ of coram nobis must raise new issues of law or fact that could not have been raised while the petitioner was in custody. In Morgan, the Court announced the writ was available where no other remedy is available. However, petitioners occasionally misinterpret this statement as an opportunity to re-raise arguments from previous post-conviction petitions. Appellate courts have consistently determined that the writ of coram nobis cannot be used as a "second chance" to challenge a conviction using the same grounds raised in a previous challenge.
- Petitioners who filed a § 2255 motion and it was denied while in custody must obtain authorization from the district court in order to file a coram nobis petition. Currently, this rule only applies to those in the Eighth Circuit Court of Appeals. In 2018, the Eighth Circuit became the first appellate court to decide whether a petition for writ of coram nobis is governed by the Antiterrorism and Effective Death Penalty Act of 1996 ("AEDPA") restrictions on successive relief as defined in § 2255(h)(1) and (2). The Eighth Circuit held that coram nobis petitioners who filed a § 2255 motion, while in custody and the motion was denied while the petitioner remained in custody, is restricted by AEDPA from filing a coram nobis petition without first obtaining authorization from the district court to file the coram nobis petition. This requirement is different from those in custody who are required to obtain authorization from the appellate court in order to file a successive § 2255 motion. Other federal appellate courts have yet to issue an opinion on this question.
- A petition for a writ of coram nobis must provide adverse consequences which exist from the conviction. A circuit split exists on this requirement. The First, Second, Third, Fifth, Seventh, Eighth, and Tenth circuit courts administer a "civil disabilities test" which requires a coram nobis petitioner to prove that his conviction produced ongoing collateral consequences; however, the Fourth, Ninth and Eleventh Circuits have held that the petitioner need not show that he is suffering from an ongoing "civil disability" because "collateral consequences flow from any criminal conviction". The Sixth circuit has granted coram nobis relief without mentioning this requirement.
- The writ of coram nobis is an extraordinary remedy to correct errors of the most fundamental character. The error to be corrected must be an error which resulted in a complete miscarriage of justice. In other words, the error is one that has rendered the proceeding itself irregular and invalid. Typically, the same errors that are deemed grounds for Section 2255 habeas relief also justify coram nobis relief. For those claiming actual innocence, a fundamental miscarriage of justice occurs where a constitutional violation has resulted in the conviction of one who is actually innocent.

==== Procedural rules in federal district courts ====
- District court clerks should file petitions for writs of coram nobis under the original case number In Morgan, the Supreme Court provided that the writ of coram nobis is a step in the criminal case and not the beginning of a separate civil proceeding. As a result, district courts, such as those in the Ninth Circuit, file petitions for writs of coram nobis under the original criminal case number.
- District courts should construe incorrectly titled petitions with the appropriate title. Whenever a federal district court receives an incorrectly labeled or incorrectly titled petition, the court should construe the petition correctly. District courts should construe a coram nobis petition from a federal prisoner as a petition for writ of habeas corpus. Similarly, district courts should construe a habeas corpus petition from a former federal prisoner as a petition for writ of coram nobis. Federal courts have determined that a person on probation is still a federal prisoner; therefore, petitioners in this category must file a petition for writ of habeas corpus. A federal prisoner convicted of more than one federal crime may file a petition for writ of coram nobis to challenge any conviction where the sentence is complete; but the prisoner must file a writ of habeas corpus to challenge any conviction where the sentence is not complete.

==== Procedural rules in federal appellate courts ====
- Appeals from coram nobis orders are subject to a 60-day filing period. Until 2002, two provisions in Morgan divided the federal appellate courts interpretation on the time limits to file an appeal from a district court's decision on a coram nobis petition. First, Morgan held that "the writ of coram nobis is a step in the criminal case". Second, Morgan held that "the writ of coram nobis is of the same general character as the writ of habeas corpus". This created a conflict in the courts of appeals regarding the time limits that applied to appeals from coram nobis orders. In 2002, Congress added language to the Federal Rules of Appellate Procedure that clarified an application for a writ of error coram nobis is subject to a 60-day filing period.
- Appeals from coram nobis orders do not require a certificate of appealability. In 1996, Congress enacted the Antiterrorism and Effective Death Penalty Act of 1996 ("AEDPA") which included language that limits the power of federal judges to grant motions for habeas relief, including motions for relief pursuant to 28 U.S.C. § 2255. AEDPA requires a Certificate of Appealability in order to appeal a district court's ruling on a habeas corpus petition. Unlike the writ of habeas corpus, a Certificate of Appealability is not required in order to appeal a district court's ruling on a coram nobis petition. Neither the 28 U.S.C. § 1651(a) statute making the writ of coram nobis available in federal courts in criminal matters nor any Federal Rule of Appellate Procedure requires a certificate of appealability before an appeal may be taken, nor does such a requirement appear in the case law. Some prisoners have attempted to file coram nobis petitions if AEDPA prevents the petitioner from filing under § 2255. However, federal courts have consistently held that prisoners may not resort to the writ of coram nobis in order to bypass AEDPA's gatekeeping requirements.
- The standard of review from a district court's denial of a coram nobis petition is similar to the standard of review from a district court's denial of a habeas corpus petition. Generally, the standard of review is that any district court's determinations on questions of law are reviewed de novo, but that district court's determinations on questions of fact are reviewed for clear error (or clearly erroneous error). Under de novo review of federal coram nobis cases, the appellate court acts as if it were considering the question of law for the first time, affording no deference to the decision of the district court. Under Clear Error review of federal coram nobis cases, the appellate court must have a "definite and firm conviction that a mistake has been committed" by the district court.

== U.S. state courts ==
Only sixteen state courts and District of Columbia courts recognize the availability of writs of coram nobis or coram vobis. Each state is free to operate its own coram nobis procedures independent of other state courts as well as the federal court system. The writ of coram nobis is not available in a majority of states because those states have enacted uniform post-conviction acts that provide a streamlined, single remedy for obtaining relief from a judgment of conviction, and that remedy is available to petitioners who are no longer in custody. States that have replaced writs of coram nobis with remedies within their post-conviction proceedings are also independent of other state courts as well as the federal court system. These proceedings enacted by state legislatures may either be more or less stringent than the writs it replaced or the post-conviction proceedings of other states.

=== Availability ===
The following table provides whether each state's courts are authorized to issue a writ of coram nobis (or a writ of coram vobis), or provides the state statute which replaced or abolished the writ.

US state courts authorized to issue the writ of coram nobis

State	Writ of coram nobis replaced/abolished by
Alabama	Coram nobis recognized by Alabama state courts
Alaska	Alaska Criminal Rule 35.1
Arizona	Arizona Rules of Criminal Procedure 32.1
Arkansas	Coram nobis recognized by Arkansas state courts
California	Coram nobis recognized by California state courts
Colorado	Colorado Rules of Criminal Procedure 35
Connecticut	Coram nobis recognized by Connecticut state courts
Delaware	Delaware Superior Court Criminal Rule 61
District of Columbia	Coram nobis recognized by District of Columbia courts
Florida	Florida Rule of Criminal Procedure 3.850
Georgia	Official Code of Georgia Annotated § 5-6-35 (a) (7)
Hawaii	Hawaiʻi Rules of Penal Procedure Rule 40(a)(1)
Idaho	Idaho Code Annotated § 19-4901
Illinois	Illinois Code of Civil Procedure § 2-1401
Indiana	Indiana Rules of Post-Conviction Procedure § 1
Iowa	Iowa Code Annotated § 822.1
Kansas	Kansas Statutes Annotated 60-260
Kentucky	Kentucky Rules of Civil Procedure CR 60.02
Louisiana	Louisiana Code of Criminal Procedure Art. 930.8
Maine	Maine Revised Statutes 15 § 2122, 2124
Maryland	Coram nobis recognized by Maryland state courts
Massachusetts	Massachusetts Rules of Criminal Procedure Rule 30 (a)
Michigan	Michigan Court Rules 6.502(C)(3)
Minnesota	Minnesota statute. § 590.01 subd. 2
Mississippi	Mississippi Code Annotated section 99-39-3(1)
Missouri	Missouri Rules of Criminal Procedure Rule 29.15
Montana	Montana Code Annotated § 46–21-101
Nebraska	Coram nobis recognized by Nebraska state courts
Nevada	Coram nobis recognized by Nevada state courts
New Hampshire	Coram nobis recognized by New Hampshire state courts
New Jersey	New Jersey Court Rule 3:22
New Mexico	New Mexico Rules Annotated Rule 1-060(B)(6)
New York	Coram nobis recognized by New York state courts
North Carolina	North Carolina General Statutes § 15A-1411 (2009)
North Dakota	North Dakota Century Code § 29–32.1-01 (2006)
Ohio	Ohio Revised Code Annotated § 2953.21
Oklahoma	Oklahoma Statutes Title 22, § 1080
Oregon	Coram nobis recognized by Oregon state courts
Pennsylvania	Pennsylvania Consolidated Statutes 42 § 9542
Rhode Island	Rhode Island General Laws § 10–9.1-1 (2012)
South Carolina	South Carolina Code of Laws Annotated § 17-27-20 (2003)
South Dakota	Coram nobis recognized by South Dakota state courts
Tennessee	Coram nobis recognized by Tennessee state courts
Texas	Texas Code of Criminal Procedure article 11.05
Utah	Utah Code Annotated §§ 78B-9-102, -104
Vermont	Coram nobis recognized by Vermont state courts
Virginia	Coram vobis recognized by Virginia state courts
Washington	Washington Rules of Appellate Procedure 16.4(b)
West Virginia	Coram nobis recognized by West Virginia state courts
Wisconsin	Coram nobis recognized by Wisconsin state courts
Wyoming	Wyoming Rules of Criminal Procedure Rule 35

=== Alabama ===
Alabama state courts strictly follow the common law definition of the writ of coram nobis where the writ may only be issued to correct errors of fact. The writ may not be issued to correct errors of law. The writ has only been applied to juveniles. The Alabama Court of Criminal Appeals provided the following background and guidelines for coram nobis petitions for state courts in Alabama (citations and quotations removed):

Rule 32, Ala. R. Crim. P. is applicable only to a "Defendant convicted of a criminal offense". Under Alabama law, a juvenile is not convicted of a criminal offense so as to be able to take advantage of the provisions of Rule 32. The writ of error coram nobis is an extraordinary remedy known more for its denial than its approval. Even so, Alabama Courts allow the writ of error coram nobis to attack judgments in certain restricted instances. When no rule or statute controls, "[t]he common law of England, so far as it is not inconsistent with the Constitution, laws and institutions of this state, shall, together with such institutions and laws, be the rule of decisions, and shall continue in force, except as from time to time it may be altered or repealed by the Legislature." § 1-3-1, Ala. Code 1975.

The writ of error coram nobis was one of the oldest remedies of the common law. It lay to correct a judgment rendered by the court upon errors of fact not appearing on the record and so important that if the court had known of them at the trial it would not have rendered the judgment. The ordinary writ of error lay to an appellate court to review an error of law apparent on the record. The writ of error coram nobis lay to the court, and preferably to the judge that rendered the contested judgment. Its purpose was to allow the correction of an error not appearing in the record and of a judgment which presumably would not have been entered had the error been known to the court at the trial. Further, a judgment for the plaintiff in error on an ordinary writ of error may reverse and render the judgment complained of, while a judgment for the petitioner on a writ of error coram nobis necessarily recalls and vacates the judgment complained of and restores the case to the docket for new trial. An evidentiary hearing must be held on a coram nobis petition which is meritorious on its face. An evidentiary hearing on a coram nobis petition are required upon meritorious allegations:

- that counsel was denied.
- that the State used perjured testimony.
- that petitioner was not advised of right to appeal or right to transcript.
- of an ineffective assistance of counsel, specifically, failing to present alibi witnesses and failing to subpoena witnesses.
- of the denial of effective assistance of counsel.

A writ of error coram nobis is also the proper procedural mechanism by which a juvenile who has been adjudicated delinquent may collaterally challenge that adjudication.

=== Arkansas ===
Arkansas state courts may issue a writ of coram nobis for only four types of claims: insanity at the time of trial, a coerced guilty plea, material evidence withheld by the prosecutor, or a third-party confession to the crime during the time between conviction and appeal. The Supreme Court of Arkansas provides the following background and guidelines of coram nobis petitions for state courts in Arkansas (citations and quotations removed):

An Arkansas trial court can entertain a petition for writ of error coram nobis after a judgment has been affirmed on appeal only after the Arkansas Supreme Court grants permission to recall the case's mandate. A writ of error coram nobis is an extraordinarily rare remedy. Coram nobis proceedings are administered with a strong presumption that the judgment of conviction is valid. The function of the writ is to secure relief from a judgment rendered while there existed some fact that would have prevented its rendition if it had been known to the trial court and which, through no negligence or fault of the defendant, was not brought forward before rendition of the judgment. The petitioner has the burden of demonstrating a fundamental error of fact extrinsic to the record. The court is not required to accept at face value the allegations of the petition.

Due diligence is required in making application for relief, and, in the absence of a valid excuse for delay, the petition will be denied. The mere naked allegation that a constitutional right has been invaded will not suffice. The application should make a full disclosure of specific facts relied upon and not merely state conclusions as to the nature of such facts.

The essence of the writ of coram nobis is that it is addressed to the very court that renders the judgment where injustice is alleged to have been done, rather than to an appellate or other court. The writ is allowed only under compelling circumstances to achieve justice and to address errors of the most fundamental nature. A writ of coram nobis is available to address certain errors of the most fundamental nature that are found in one of four categories:

1. Insanity at the time of trial,
2. A coerced guilty plea,
3. Material evidence withheld by the prosecutor, or
4. A third-party confession to the crime during the time between conviction and appeal.

To warrant coram nobis relief, the petitioner has the burden of demonstrating a fundamental error extrinsic to the record that would have prevented rendition of the judgment had it been known and, through no fault of the petitioner, was not brought forward before rendition of judgment. Moreover, the fact that a petitioner merely alleges a Brady violation is not sufficient to provide a basis for coram nobis relief. To establish a Brady violation, three elements are required: (1) the evidence at issue must be favorable to the accused, either because it is exculpatory or because it is impeaching; (2) that evidence must have been suppressed by the State, either willfully or inadvertently; (3) prejudice must have ensued.

=== California ===
California state courts strictly follow the common-law definition of the writ of coram nobis where the writ may only be issued to correct errors of fact. The writ may not be issued to correct errors of law. The Supreme Court of California provided the following background and guidelines of coram nobis petitions for state courts in California (citations and quotations removed):

The writ of coram nobis is a non-statutory, common law remedy whose origins trace back to an era in England in which appeals and new trial motions were unknown. Far from being of constitutional origin, the proceeding designated "coram nobis" was contrived by the courts at an early epoch in the growth of common law procedure to provide a corrective remedy because of the absence at that time of the right to move for a new trial and the right of appeal from the judgment. The grounds on which a litigant may obtain relief via a writ of coram nobis are narrower than on habeas corpus. The writ's purpose is to secure relief, where no other remedy exists, from a judgment rendered while there existed some fact which would have prevented its rendition if the trial court had known it and which, through no negligence or fault of the defendant, was not then known to the court.

The principal office of the writ of coram nobis was to enable the same court which had rendered the judgment to reconsider it in a case in which the record still remained before that court. The most comprehensive statement of the office and function of this writ which has come to our notice is the following: The office of the writ of coram nobis is to bring the attention of the court to, and obtain relief from, errors of fact, such as the death of either party pending the suit and before judgment therein; or infancy, where the party was not properly represented by guardian, or coverture, where the common-law disability still exists, or insanity, it seems, at the time of the trial; or a valid defense existing in the facts of the case, but which, without negligence on the part of the defendant, was not made, either through duress or fraud or excusable mistake; these facts not appearing on the face of the record, and being such as, if known in season, would have prevented the rendition and entry of the judgment questioned.

The writ of coram nobis does not lie to correct any error in the judgment of the court nor to contradict or put in issue any fact directly passed upon and affirmed by the judgment itself. If this could be, there would be no end of litigation. The writ of coram nobis is not intended to authorize any court to review and revise its opinions; but only to enable it to recall some adjudication made while some fact existed which, if before the court, would have prevented the rendition of the judgment; and which without fault or negligence of the party, was not presented to the court. It is not a writ whereby convicts may attack or relitigate just any judgment on a criminal charge merely because the unfortunate person may become displeased with his confinement or with any other result of the judgment under attack.

With the advent of statutory new trial motions, the availability of direct appeal, and the expansion of the scope of the writ of habeas corpus, writs of coram nobis had, by the 1930s, become a remedy practically obsolete except in the most rare of instances and applicable to only a very limited class of cases. The statutory motion for new trial has, for most purposes, superseded the common law remedy; and, until recent years, coram nobis was virtually obsolete in California.

The seminal case setting forth the modern requirements for obtaining a writ of coram nobis is People v. Shipman which stated the writ of coram nobis may be granted only when three requirements are met:

1. The petitioner must show that some fact exists which, without any fault or negligence on his part, was not presented to the court at the trial on the merits, and which if presented would have prevented the rendition of the judgment.
2. The petitioner must show that the newly discovered evidence does not go to the merits of issues tried; issues of fact, once adjudicated, even though incorrectly, cannot be reopened except on motion for new trial. This second requirement applies even though the evidence in question is not discovered until after the time for moving for a new trial has elapsed or the motion has been denied.
3. The petitioner must show that the facts upon which he relies were not known to him and could not in the exercise of due diligence have been discovered by him at any time substantially earlier than the time of his motion for the writ.

Several aspects of the test set forth in Shipman illustrate the narrowness of the remedy. Because the writ of coram nobis applies where a fact unknown to the parties and the court existed at the time of judgment that, if known, would have prevented rendition of the judgment, the remedy does not lie to enable the court to correct errors of law. Moreover, the allegedly new fact must have been unknown and must have been in existence at the time of the judgment.

For a newly discovered fact to qualify as the basis for the writ of coram nobis, courts look to the fact itself and not its legal effect. It has often been held that the motion or writ is not available where a defendant voluntarily and with knowledge of the facts pleaded guilty or admitted alleged prior convictions because of ignorance or mistake as to the legal effect of those facts.

Finally, the writ of coram nobis is unavailable when a litigant has some other remedy at law. A writ of coram nobis is not available where the defendant had a remedy by (a) appeal or (b) motion for a new trial and failed to avail himself of such remedies. The writ of coram nobis is not a catch-all by which those convicted may litigate and relitigate the propriety of their convictions ad infinitum. In the vast majority of cases a trial followed by a motion for a new trial and an appeal affords adequate protection to those accused of crime. The writ of coram nobis serves a limited and useful purpose. It will be used to correct errors of fact which could not be corrected in any other manner. But it is well-settled law in this and in other states that where other and adequate remedies exist the writ is not available.

The writ was issued by state courts in California in these types of situations:

- Where the defendant was insane at the time of trial and this fact was unknown to court and counsel.
- Where defendant was an infant and appeared by attorney without the appointment of a guardian or guardian ad litem.
- Where the defendant was a feme covert and her husband was not joined.
- Where the defendant was a slave and was tried and sentenced as a free man.
- Where the defendant was dead at the time judgment was rendered.
- Where default was entered against a defendant who had not been served with summons and who had no notice of the proceeding.
- Where counsel inadvertently entered an unauthorized appearance in behalf of a defendant who had not been served with process.
- Where a plea of guilty was procured by extrinsic fraud.
- Where a plea of guilty was extorted through fear of mob violence.
- Where defendants and their counsel were induced by false representations to remain away from the trial under circumstances amounting to extrinsic fraud.

By contrast, the writ of coram nobis was found unavailable by state courts in California in the following situations:

- Where trial counsel improperly induced the defendant to plead guilty to render him eligible for diversion and the trial court eventually denied diversion.
- Where the defendant pleaded guilty to having a prior felony conviction when he was eligible to have the prior reduced to a misdemeanor.
- Where the defendant discovered new facts that would have bolstered the defense already presented at trial. The court concluded that although the new facts would have been material and possibly beneficial to the defendant at trial, they would not have precluded entry of the judgment.
- Where the defendant mistakenly believed his plea to second degree murder meant he would serve no more than 15 years in prison.
- Where the defendant claimed neither his attorney nor the court had advised him before he pleaded that his convictions would render him eligible for civil commitment under the Sexually Violent Predators Act (SVPA).
- Where the defendant challenged the legality of his arrest, the identity of the informant, and the failure of the court to make findings on the prior convictions. Coram nobis denied on the ground that "all of these matters could have been raised on appeal".

=== Connecticut ===
Connecticut state courts strictly follow the common-law definition of the writ of coram nobis where the writ may only be issued to correct errors of fact. The writ may not be issued to correct errors of law. The Supreme Court of Connecticut provided the following background and guidelines of coram nobis petitions for state courts in Connecticut (citations and quotations removed):

A writ of coram nobis is an ancient common-law remedy which is authorized only by the trial judge. The same judge who presided over the trial of the defendant is the only judge with the authority to entertain a writ of coram nobis unless the judge who presided over the case was not available, such as retirement or reassignment. If the original presiding judge is not available, then a judge of the same court must entertain the writ.

The writ must be filed within three years of conviction. This limitation is jurisdictional, so trial courts must dismiss petitions filed after the three-year limitations for lack of jurisdiction. This limitations period for coram nobis petitions has been the law in Connecticut since the 1870s.

The facts must be unknown at the time of the trial without fault of the party seeking relief. The writ must present facts, not appearing in the record, which, if true, would show that such judgment was void or voidable.

A writ of coram nobis lies only in the unusual situation in which no adequate remedy is provided by law. Moreover, when habeas corpus affords a proper and complete remedy the writ of coram nobis will not lie. Prisoners who are in custody may only attack their conviction or sentence through habeas corpus and they are not eligible to file writs of coram nobis.

=== District of Columbia ===
District of Columbia courts were established in 1970. The court's authority is derived from the United States Congress rather than from the inherent sovereignty of the states. District of Columbia courts may issue the writ of coram nobis to correct either errors of fact or errors of law. The District of Columbia Court of Appeals provided the following background and guidelines of coram nobis petitions for District of Columbia courts (citations and quotations removed):

The writ of coram nobis in the District of Columbia is similar to the US Federal Court's interpretation of the writ where the writ of coram nobis is an extraordinary remedy that can be used to correct a legal or factual error.

The primary function of the writ of coram nobis at common law was to correct errors of fact on the part of the trial court, not attributable to the negligence of the defendant, when the errors alleged were of the most fundamental character; that is, such as rendered the proceeding itself irregular and invalid. The writ of provides a petitioner the opportunity to correct errors of fact not apparent on the face of the record and unknown to the trial court. In reviewing a petition for such a writ, there is a presumption that the proceeding in question was without error, and the petitioner bears the burden of showing otherwise.

The writ of coram nobis is available under the All Writs Act, 28 U.S.C. 1651(a) (2006), and the petitioner must show:

1. The trial court was unaware of the facts giving rise to the petition;
2. The omitted information is such that it would have prevented the sentence or judgment;
3. The petitioner is able to justify the failure to provide the information;
4. The error is extrinsic to the record; and
5. The error is of the most fundamental character.

=== Maryland ===
Maryland state courts may issue the writ of coram nobis to correct either errors of fact or errors of law. The Maryland Court of Appeals provided the following background and guidelines of coram nobis petitions for state courts in Maryland (citations and quotations removed):

A convicted petitioner is entitled to relief through the common law writ of coram nobis if and only if:

1. The petitioner challenges a conviction based on constitutional, jurisdictional, or fundamental grounds, whether factual or legal;
2. The petitioner rebuts the presumption of regularity that attaches to the criminal case;
3. The petitioner faces significant collateral consequences from the conviction;
4. The issue as to the alleged error has not been waived or "finally litigated in a prior proceeding, [absent] intervening changes in the applicable law";
5. The petitioner is not entitled to another statutory or common law remedy (for example, the petitioner cannot be incarcerated in a State prison or on parole or probation, as the petitioner likely could then petition for post-conviction relief).

In 2015, the Maryland Code (2014 Supp.), § 8-401 of the Criminal Procedure Article ("CP § 8-401") clarified that the failure to seek an appeal in a criminal case may not be construed as a waiver of the right to file a petition for writ of coram nobis.

A writ denied in a lower state court may be appealed. A writ of coram nobis remains a civil action in Maryland, independent of the underlying action from which it arose. As a coram nobis case is an independent civil action, an appeal from a final judgment in such an action is authorized by the broad language of the general appeals statute, Code § 12-301 of the Courts and Judicial Proceedings Article. An appeal under the general appeals statutes would lie from a final trial court judgment in a coram nobis proceeding. Although the Post Conviction Procedure Act precludes appeals in coram nobis cases brought by an incarcerated person "challenging the validity of incarceration under sentence of imprisonment", neither the Post Conviction Procedure Act nor any other statute which has been called to our attention restricts the right of appeal for a convicted person who is not incarcerated and not on parole or probation, who is suddenly faced with a significant collateral consequence of his or her conviction, and who can legitimately challenge the conviction on constitutional or fundamental grounds. Such person should be able to file a motion for coram nobis relief regardless of whether the alleged infirmity in the conviction is considered an error of fact or an error of law.

=== Nebraska ===
Nebraska state courts strictly follow the common-law definition of the writ of coram nobis where the writ may only be issued to correct errors of fact. The writ may not be issued to correct errors of law. The Supreme Court of Nebraska provided the following background and guidelines of coram nobis petitions for state courts in Nebraska (citations and quotations removed):

The common-law writ of coram nobis exists in Nebraska under Nebraska Revised Statutes § 49-101 (Reissue 2010), which adopts English common law to the extent that it is not inconsistent with the Constitution of the United States, the organic law of this state, or any law passed by the Nebraska Legislature.

The purpose of the writ of error coram nobis is to bring before the court rendering judgment matters of fact which, if known at the time the judgment was rendered, would have prevented its rendition. The writ reaches only matters of fact unknown to the applicant at the time of judgment, not discoverable through reasonable diligence, and which are of a nature that, if known by the court, would have prevented entry of judgment. The writ is not available to correct errors of law.

The burden of proof in a proceeding to obtain a writ of coram nobis is upon the applicant claiming the error, and the alleged error of fact must be such as would have prevented a conviction. It is not enough to show that it might have caused a different result.

A writ of coram nobis reaches only matters of fact unknown to the applicant at the time of judgment, not discoverable through reasonable diligence, and which are of a nature that, if known by the court, would have prevented entry of judgment. Claims of errors or misconduct at trial and ineffective assistance of counsel are inappropriate for coram nobis relief. The writ of coram nobis is not available to correct errors of law.

=== Nevada ===
Nevada state courts strictly follow the common-law definition of the writ of coram nobis where the writ may only be issued to correct errors of fact. The writ may not be issued to correct errors of law. The Supreme Court of Nevada provided the following background and guidelines of coram nobis petitions for state courts in Nevada (citations and quotations removed):

Nevada Revised Statute 1.030, recognizes the applicability of the common law, and the all-writs language in Article 6, Section 6 of the Nevada Constitution. This statute provides that the common law of England, so far as it is not repugnant to or in conflict with the Constitution and laws of the United States, or the Constitution and laws of Nevada, shall be the rule of decision in all the courts of Nevada. The post-conviction remedy authorized by Nevada statute, NRS 34.724(2)(b), provides that the petitioner must be in actual custody or have suffered a criminal conviction and not completed the sentence imposed pursuant to the judgment of conviction. Therefore, this statute is not available for those who are no longer in custody. Therefore, the common-law writ of coram nobis is available for a person who is not in custody on the conviction being challenged.

The writ of coram nobis may be used to address errors of fact outside the record that affect the validity and regularity of the decision itself and would have precluded the judgment from being rendered. The writ is limited to errors involving facts that were not known to the court, were not withheld by the defendant, and would have prevented entry of the judgment. A factual error does not include claims of newly discovered evidence because these types of claims would not have precluded the judgment from being entered in the first place. A claim of ineffective assistance of counsel also involves legal error and is therefore not available.

Any error that was reasonably available to be raised while the petitioner was in custody is waived, and it is the petitioner's burden on the face of his petition to demonstrate that he could not have reasonably raised his claims during the time he was in custody.

In filing the petition in the trial court is a step in the criminal process; however, the writ of coram nobis should be treated as a civil writ for appeal purposes. The writ is a discretionary writ and so a lower court's ruling on a petition for the writ is reviewed under the abuse of discretion standard in the appellate court.

=== New Hampshire ===
New Hampshire courts may issue a writ of coram nobis to correct errors of fact. It is currently undetermined whether the writ may be issued to correct errors of law. The New Hampshire Supreme Court provided the following background and guidelines of coram nobis petitions for state courts in New Hampshire (citations and quotations removed):

The writ of coram nobis is an ancient writ that developed in sixteenth century England. The writ addresses errors discovered when the petitioner is no longer in custody and therefore cannot avail himself of the writ of habeas corpus. Granting such an extraordinary writ is reserved for the rarest of cases.

Because the writ of coram nobis existed within the body of English common law prior to adoption of our constitution, it continues to exist as a matter of New Hampshire common law so long as it is not "repugnant to the rights and liberties contained in [our] constitution". N.H. CONST. pt. II, art. 90. The common law writ of coram nobis is available in New Hampshire courts, because it was in force at the time of the New Hampshire constitution and there is no conflict between the writ of coram nobis and the constitution. The standard of appellate review of the denial of coram nobis is the same as the standard of review for a habeas corpus petition.

Coram nobis is available to correct a constitutional violation. A requirement to bringing a petition for a writ of coram nobis is that sound reasons exist for failing to seek appropriate earlier relief.

New Hampshire courts rely upon habeas corpus procedures to guide its approach to coram nobis proceedings, given the similarities between these avenues for relief. Similarly to habeas petitions, a trial court may deny a petition for a writ of coram nobis without holding an evidentiary hearing if the record clearly demonstrates that the defendant is not entitled to coram nobis relief.

=== New York ===
New York state courts may issue a writ of coram nobis only for claims of ineffective assistance of appellate counsel. The Court of Appeals of the State of New York provided the following background and guidelines of coram nobis petitions for state courts in New York (citations and quotations removed):

In New York courts, the writ of coram nobis is available but its application is considerably different than the writ's application in other courts. In 1971, most of the common-law, coram nobis types of relief were abrogated when the New York Criminal Procedure Law § 440.10 (CPL 440.10) was enacted to embrace the deprivation of constitutional rights outside the record; however, the specific category of "ineffective assistance of appellate counsel" was not specified by the Legislature at the time of its enactment.

The U.S. Constitution provides that a criminal defendant must be provided a right to appeal an unconstitutionally deficient performance of counsel. Consistent with the demands of due process, a criminal defendant must be allowed to assert that a right to appeal was extinguished due solely to the unconstitutionally deficient performance of counsel in failing to file a timely notice of appeal.

CPL 460.30 contains a significant restriction as it imposes a one-year limit for the filing of a motion for leave to file a late notice of appeal. Consistent with the due process mandate, CPL 460.30 should not categorically bar an appellate court from considering that a defendant's application to pursue an untimely appeal whenever:

1. An attorney has failed to comply with a timely request for the filing of a notice of appeal and
2. The defendant alleges that the omission could not reasonably have been discovered within the one-year period, the time limit imposed in CPL 460.30.

Whenever these two criteria are met, the proper procedure is a coram nobis application to the Appellate Division. After CPL 440.10 was enacted, common-law coram nobis proceeding brought in the proper appellate court became the only available and appropriate procedure and forum to review a claim of ineffective assistance of appellate counsel.–

=== Oregon ===
In November 2018, the Oregon Court of Appeals determined that the writ of coram nobis is available in rare cases where newly discovered evidence provides clear and convincing evidence of actual innocence. The Oregon Court of Appeals provided the following background and guidelines of coram nobis petitions for state courts in Oregon (citations and quotations removed):

The process that now governs Oregon post-conviction relief claims, the Post-Conviction Hearing Act (PCHA), was enacted in 1959. Before its enactment, Oregon had a complex and confusing array of post-conviction remedies, including writs of habeas corpus (as provided both in the Oregon Constitution and in statutes), writs of coram nobis, motions to correct the record, and motions to vacate the judgment. The PCHA was intended to provide a detailed, unitary procedure to persons seeking postconviction relief.

From the time that it was enacted, there were questions as to whether the PCHA addressed claims of factual mistake based on newly discovered evidence—and the extent to which the PCHA altered the remedies available under preexisting law to a convicted person seeking to establish innocence through evidence discovered after the person's criminal trial. Two lawyers who participated in drafting the bill that became the PCHA, Jack Collins and Carl Neil, authored a law review article shortly after the act was adopted. In it, they suggested that innocence claims predicated on newly discovered evidence of innocence were not covered by the act (unless the evidence had been withheld from the petitioner by the prosecutor in a manner that violated the Fourteenth Amendment.) Collins and Neil observed that one of the remedies abolished by the PCHA, coram nobis, "might have been available" in the case of newly discovered evidence establishing innocence. Coram nobis was a procedural tool to correct errors of fact in judicial proceedings, and it functioned as a delayed motion for a new trial. However, Collins and Neil noted that the PCHA forecloses this possibility by abolishing coram nobis in criminal cases. Collins and Neil suggested that the problem of newly discovered evidence should be the subject of additional legislation. More than a half century has passed, and the legislature has not enacted such additional legislation or amended the text of ORS 138.530. Thus, the statutory bases for relief under the PCHA remain essentially as they were in 1959—with no more clarity as to whether the PCHA provides a mechanism for advancing a claim of innocence based on newly discovered evidence.

To the extent the constitution may protect the right of a convicted person to collaterally challenge a conviction based on new evidence of actual innocence, that remedy likely would take the form of coram nobis, a remedy that, historically, demanded proof of an extraordinary circumstance of innocence based on newly discovered evidence. Thus, in Oregon state courts

- The writ of coram nobis, or "motion in the nature of coram nobis", is an elastic but extraordinary remedy to correct mistakes of fact that occurred at trial.
- The writ of coram nobis or motion in the nature of coram nobis allows courts to avoid manifest injustice or fraud on the court.
- Coram nobis is available only if it appears from the petition that the facts tendered as a basis for a new trial would have prevented the judgment entered.
- The standard for any cognizable actual-innocence claim under Oregon law, whether based on underlying constitutional or common-law principles, would necessarily reflect the same hesitance toward reopening a criminal proceeding based on anything less than reliable and compelling evidence calling into question, as a factual matter, the convicted person's guilt.
- The principles governing claims of actual innocence in federal court, to the extent those principles foreshadow the parameters of a federal constitutional claim of actual innocence, likewise indicate that a federal claim would be governed by similar exacting standards.

=== South Dakota ===
South Dakota state courts strictly follow the common-law definition of the writ of coram nobis where the writ may only be issued to correct errors of fact. The writ may not be issued to correct errors of law. The Supreme Court of South Dakota provided the following background and guidelines of coram nobis petitions for state courts in South Dakota (citations and quotations removed):

The writ of coram nobis has traditionally been used to present facts extrinsic to the record in circumstances where no other remedy was available. An elementary restriction to the writ is that it will not permit a new examination of questions previously determined. Nor may it be employed as an alternative for direct appeal or habeas corpus.

In South Dakota, the jurisdiction of a court to grant relief under coram nobis is of limited scope. Any proceeding which is challenged by the writ is presumed to be correct and the burden rests on its petitioner to show otherwise. Relief will be granted only when circumstances compel such action to achieve justice. With one significant exception, coram nobis deals only with errors of fact. The exception is that the writ can reach certain constitutionally significant errors like jurisdictional defects.

The writ permits review of new evidence only if it was discovered after entry of the judgment and could not have been discovered and produced during the period when a statutory remedy was available. Any factual errors which have been, could have been, or should have been reviewed with another available remedy cannot be examined in coram nobis. On the other hand, facts incapable of being brought out earlier due to fraud or coercion may form the basis for coram nobis relief.

Those seeking coram nobis relief must carefully study the procedural history of the case, because past events control over which issues may or may not be raised and trial records have to be examined in order to ascertain whether a claim is barred.

=== Tennessee ===
Tennessee courts may issue a writ of coram nobis only for subsequently or newly discovered evidence relating to matters which were litigated at the trial if the judge determines that such evidence may have resulted in a different judgment had it been presented at the trial. The Supreme Court of Tennessee provided the following background and guidelines of coram nobis petitions for state courts in Tennessee (citations and quotations removed):

In Tennessee, the writ of coram nobis was recognized at common law but was not available in criminal cases. In 1858, the Tennessee General Assembly codified the procedure for petitioning for a writ of error coram nobis. This early codification of the writ was very limited in scope and could not be used to challenge judgments in criminal cases. In 1955, Tennessee's General Assembly extended the writ of error coram nobis to apply specifically to criminal proceedings. However, the new statutory writ could not be used to collaterally challenge a conviction based on newly discovered evidence. Finally, in 1978, the legislature broadened the scope of the writ to permit it to be used to challenge a judgment in a criminal case based on newly discovered evidence. Though the writ of coram nobis in civil cases was superseded when Rule 60 of the Tennessee Rules of Civil Procedure became effective in 1971, the adoption of Rule 60 did not supersede the statute which extended the writ as an available remedy in criminal proceedings. Currently the Tennessee statute on the writ of coram nobis provides:

Upon a showing by the defendant that the defendant was without fault in failing to present certain evidence at the proper time, a writ of coram nobis will lie for subsequently or newly discovered evidence relating to matters which were litigated at the trial if the judge determines that such evidence may have resulted in a different judgment, had it been presented at the trial.

The decision whether to grant or deny a petition for writ of coram nobis lies within the discretionary authority of the trial court. The writ of coram nobis is not available for attacking a guilty plea. Before granting a writ of coram nobis, the trial court must be satisfied with the reliability of the newly discovered evidence and determine that the defendant is without fault in timely discovering such evidence. The trial court must then review the evidence presented at trial and at the coram nobis proceeding and determine whether a reasonable basis exists for concluding that had the new evidence been presented at trial, the result of the proceedings might have been different. Coram nobis claims are not easily resolved on the face of the petition and often require a hearing; however, an evidentiary hearing is not statutorily required in every case. Coram nobis petitions with inadequate allegations are susceptible to summary dismissal on the face of the petition, without discovery or an evidentiary hearing.

The writ of error coram nobis cannot be used to advance claims under Brady v. Maryland. A Brady claim is a claim that a defendant's right to a fair trial was violated because the State withheld exculpatory evidence that it is constitutionally required to provide to defendants. Brady claims must instead be litigated through the Tennessee Post-Conviction Procedure Act. Timeliness under the statute of limitations is also an essential element of a coram nobis claim. Unless time is tolled by a court, a writ of error coram nobis must be filed within one year of the date of a defendant's conviction.

Since a petition for writ of error coram nobis is untimely unless filed within one year of the time a judgment becomes final in the trial court, a timely petition for writ of error coram nobis will almost always be filed while the defendant's direct appeal is pending. Therefore, when a convicted defendant files a petition for writ of coram nobis in the trial court while the direct appeal is pending, he or she must simultaneously file a motion in the appellate court to stay the appeal as of right until conclusion of the coram nobis proceeding in the trial court. On the same day that a petition for writ of coram nobis is filed in the trial court, the petitioner should also file in the appellate court a motion requesting that the appellate proceedings be stayed pending the trial court's decision on the writ of coram nobis. A copy of the petition should be attached to the motion. Under most circumstances, the motion to stay should be granted. If the trial court denies a coram nobis petition and the petitioner appeals the trial court's decision, the appellate courts review such the decision for an abuse of discretion. An appellate court will find an abuse of discretion only when the trial court applied incorrect legal standards, reached an illogical conclusion, based its decision on a clearly erroneous assessment of the evidence, or employed reasoning that causes an injustice to the complaining party.

=== Vermont ===
Vermont state courts strictly follow the common-law definition of the writ of coram nobis where the writ may only be issued to correct errors of fact. The writ may not be issued to correct errors of law. The Supreme Court of Vermont provided the following background and guidelines of coram nobis petitions for state courts in Vermont (citations and quotations removed):

The writ was designed to fill this gap somewhat to correct errors of fact affecting the validity and regularity of the judgment. It was commonly used in civil cases, but seldom in criminal cases. Vermont decisions have long recognized the general availability of coram nobis. In 1830, the Vermont Supreme Court explained that a writ of coram nobis will lie for error in fact, but it does not lie for error in law. The function of the writ is to call to the attention of the trial court facts and circumstances outside the record which would have precluded the entry of judgment had such facts been known and established at the time of the conviction.

In 1971, the writ was explicitly abolished in civil cases following adoption of the Vermont Rules of Civil Procedure. When the PCR statute was enacted, it provided a means for those "in custody under sentence" to vacate, set aside or correct an invalid sentence, but the statute does not mention the writ of coram nobis. Similarly, the criminal rules set out various forms of post-judgment relief do not address coram nobis explicitly. Because the Vermont PCR statute and the criminal rules are silent on the issue, the common law remedy of coram nobis is a viable means for challenging criminal convictions. It may be used when no other remedy is available, but it may not be used to supplant relief through direct appeal, post-judgment motion, or PCR petition.

The Vermont Supreme Court has provided that a petition for a writ of coram nobis must be brought in the court that rendered judgment; however, the court has not reached the question as to the scope of the writ of coram nobis in state courts.

=== Virginia ===
Virginia state courts strictly follow the common-law definition of the writ of coram vobis where the writ may only be issued to correct errors of fact. The writ may not be issued to correct errors of law. The Supreme Court of Virginia provided the following background and guidelines of coram vobis petitions for state courts in Virginia (citations and quotations removed):

In Virginia, state courts use the term "coram vobis" instead of "coram nobis", although both writs are identical in nature. Virginia state courts are the last remaining courts known to incorporate the five-hundred year-old term, "writ of coram vobis".

The term "coram vobis" is Latin for "before you". The full name is quae coram vobis resident ("Let the record remain before you"). It was called coram vobis (before you – the king's justices) in Common Pleas, where the king was not supposed to reside. It was called coram nobis (before us) in King's Bench because the king was supposed to preside in person in that court. The difference related only to the form appropriate to each court and the distinction disappeared in the United States when the need for the distinction ended.

In 1776, Virginia incorporated all of English common law by an ordinance of the Virginia convention. With the incorporation of English common law, Virginia recognized two ways in which a litigant could approach a trial court to challenge a final judgment. This could be done by 1) motion or 2) writ of coram nobis. The first Virginia case to recognize that a motion could be used to achieve the result of the writ of coram nobis was the 1795 decision in Gordon v. Frazier. In Gordon, the use of a motion to have a trial court revisit a final judgment was the general practice at that time, even though the writ of coram nobis was available for the same purpose. It appears that the reason litigants used a motion to challenge a judgment, instead of the writ, was because filing a motion was less expensive than instituting a new proceeding by filing a petition for a writ. The court in Gordon summarized this matter as follows:

This case tho' depending upon a practice not common in this country is by no means a difficult one. I have no doubt but that the error complained of might have been corrected by the same court upon motion, at a subsequent term; but I should not for that reason reverse the judgment, since the party having preferred a writ of error coram vobis had a right to proceed in that way, tho' a shorter, and much less expensive mode might have been pursued.

In 1957, the writ was substantially limited by the General Assembly through Code § 8.01-677, which provides that "[f]or any clerical error or error in fact for which a judgment may be reversed or corrected on writ of error coram vobis, the same may be reversed or corrected on motion, after reasonable notice, by the court." In other words, the Code restricted a writ of error coram vobis only to clerical errors and certain errors in fact.

The principal function of the writ in Virginia is to afford to the court in which an action was tried an opportunity to correct its own record with reference to a vital fact not known when the judgment was rendered, and which could not have been presented by a motion for a new trial, appeal or other existing statutory proceeding. In order to qualify for a writ of coram vobis:

- The petitioner must attack his conviction for an error of fact not apparent on the record.
- The discovery of factual errors must not be attributable to the applicant's negligence.
- The facts, if known by the court at the time of trial, would have prevented rendition of the judgment.

=== West Virginia ===
West Virginia state courts may issue the writ of coram nobis to correct either errors of fact or errors of law. The Supreme Court of Appeals of West Virginia provided the following background and guidelines of coram nobis petitions for state courts in West Virginia (citations and quotations removed):

The writ of coram nobis is only granted as a remedy of last resort where an error is of the most fundamental character and there exists no other available remedy. The writ is narrowly limited to extraordinary cases presenting circumstances compelling its use to achieve justice.

In West Virginia, the common law writ of coram nobis was abolished in civil cases in 1960 pursuant to Rule 60(b) of the West Virginia Rules of Civil Procedure. No provision equivalent to the relief mechanism of Rule 60(b) exists in the West Virginia Rules of Criminal Procedure.

West Virginia courts are authorized to issue the writ in criminal proceeding using criteria similar to the criteria established by the U.S. Court of Appeals for the Fourth Circuit. The criteria established a four-part test. A petitioner seeking this relief must show that:

1. A more usual remedy is not available. In other words, a petition for a writ of coram nobis may only be filed after a sentence has been served and the petitioner is no longer in custody.
2. Valid reasons exist for not attacking the conviction earlier. Petitioners need to show reasonable diligence, where legitimate justifications exist for not raising challenges to their convictions sooner or through more usual channels.
3. Adverse consequences exist from the conviction; however, West Virginia courts have not yet established what constitutes "adverse consequences".
4. The error is of the most fundamental character. The error to be corrected must be an error which resulted in a complete miscarriage of justice. In other words, the error is one that has rendered the proceeding itself irregular and invalid.

=== Wisconsin ===
Wisconsin state courts strictly follow the common-law definition of the writ of coram nobis where the writ may only be issued to correct errors of fact. The writ may not be issued to correct errors of law. The Court of Appeals of Wisconsin provided the following background and guidelines of coram nobis petitions for state courts in Wisconsin (citations and quotations removed):

The writ of coram nobis is a common law remedy which empowers the trial court to correct its own record. The writ of coram nobis was given statutory recognition by the enactment of the 1949 Revision of the Wisconsin Code of Criminal Procedure. That section 958.07 of this statute provided:

The writ of coram nobis may be issued by the trial court at any time upon the verified petition of the defendant showing sufficient grounds therefor, which may be supported by one or more affidavits. The petition and writ shall be served on the district attorney, who may move to quash the writ or make return thereto, or both. The court may hear and determine the writ either upon the affidavits submitted by the parties or upon testimony or both, in its discretion. The party aggrieved may have the determination of the trial court reviewed by the supreme court upon appeal or writ of error.

The Advisory Committee's comment to section 958.07 expressly acknowledged the fact that sec. 958.07 merely gave "statutory recognition to the common-law writ of coram nobis". This statute prescribed the procedure to be followed in granting the writ of coram nobis but did not state the grounds for issuing the writ, leaving that aspect to be determined from the cases.

The courts have established that the writ of coram nobis is of very limited scope. It is a discretionary writ which is addressed to the trial court. The purpose of the writ is to give the trial court an opportunity to correct its own record of an error of fact not appearing on the record and which error would not have been committed by the court if the matter had been brought to the attention of the trial court.

In order to constitute grounds for the issuance of a writ of coram nobis there must be shown the existence of an error of fact which was unknown at the time of trial and which is of such a nature that knowledge of its existence at the time of trial would have prevented the entry of judgment. The writ does not lie to correct errors of law and of fact appearing on the record since such errors are traditionally corrected by appeals and writs of error. Where the writ of habeas corpus affords a proper and complete remedy the writ of coram nobis will not be granted.

The petitioner must establish that no other remedy is available. In other words, the petitioner must no longer be in custody. The petitioner must also establish the factual error that the petitioner wishes to correct must be crucial to the ultimate judgment and the factual finding to which the alleged factual error is directed must not have been previously visited or passed on by the trial court.

== Notable cases ==
=== Gordon Hirabayashi, Minoru Yasui, and Fred Korematsu ===
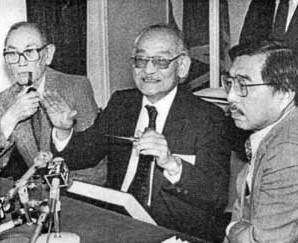
(L-R) Fred Korematsu, Minoru Yasui, and Gordon Hirabayashi

Gordon Hirabayashi, Minoru Yasui, and Fred Korematsu are best known for their principled resistance to the internment of Japanese Americans during World War II. All three had their convictions overturned through writs of coram nobis, and they were each awarded the Presidential Medal of Freedom.

After the bombing of Pearl Harbor on December 7, 1941, President Franklin D. Roosevelt's administration concluded that Japanese Americans living on the West Coast were a security threat, even though the Federal Bureau of Investigation and the Office of Naval Intelligence had argued the opposite. It thus authorized the military to secure areas from which "any or all persons may be excluded". As a result, Japanese Americans were subject to curfew and other restrictions before being forced into internment camps. Hirabayashi, Yasui, and Korematsu, who were not acquainted with each other at the time, each defied the internment and were convicted for their resistance. Their convictions would be affirmed by the U.S. Supreme Court between 1943 and 1944. Four decades after the Court's rulings, lawyers, including civil rights attorney, Peter Irons, re-opened their wartime convictions on the basis of newly discovered evidence of governmental misconduct. The new evidence indicated that the government intentionally withheld a report called the Ringle Report drafted by the Office of Naval Intelligence which would have undermined the administration's position of the military actions in concluding that a vast majority Japanese Americans did not pose a national security threat during WWII.

Gordon Hirabayashi was born in April 1918 in Seattle, Washington. He was a senior student at the University of Washington when Japanese Americans were ordered to report to internment camps. Although he first considered accepting internment, he ultimately defied it. In May 1942, Hirabayashi turned himself in to the FBI. After being convicted in October 1942 for the curfew violation, he was sentenced to 90 days in prison. He also served a one-year sentence at McNeil Island Penitentiary for Selective Service violations when he refused to answer questions that singled out Japanese Americans on the basis of race alone. He appealed to the Supreme Court where, in 1943, his conviction was upheld in Hirabayashi v. United States. In 1987, the United States Court of Appeals for the Ninth Circuit granted a writ of coram nobis that effectively overturned his criminal conviction. Hirabayashi died in January 2012 and posthumously received the Presidential Medal of Freedom in May 2012.

Minoru Yasui was born in 1916 in Hood River, Oregon. He attended law school at the University of Oregon and became the first Japanese American lawyer in Oregon in 1939. Upon the declaration of war, Yasui attempted to report for military duty, but his services were refused nine times. After hearing the news of internment, Yasui planned a legal challenge to the government's policies. In March 1942, he deliberately disobeyed the military-implemented curfew in Portland, Oregon by walking around the downtown area and then presenting himself at a police station after 11:00 pm in order to test the curfew's constitutionality. He was convicted in November 1942. Yasui appealed to the Supreme Court where his conviction was upheld in the 1943 case Yasui v. United States. In January 1984, his conviction was overturned when the U.S. District Court in Oregon granted his writ of coram nobis. Yasui died in 1986 and posthumously received the Presidential Medal of Freedom in November 2015.

Fred Korematsu was born in 1919 in Oakland, California. He attempted to enlist with the United States Navy when called for military duty under the Selective Training and Service Act of 1940, but was rejected due to stomach ulcers. In March 1942, when Japanese Americans were ordered to report to assembly centers, he refused and went into hiding in the Oakland area. He was arrested in May 1942, and held at the Presidio of San Francisco military detention center until his conviction in September 1942. The U.S. Supreme Court in December 1944 upheld his conviction in Korematsu v. United States, which has since gained notoriety as one of the Supreme Court's worst decisions of all time. In November 1983, the U.S. District Court in San Francisco formally granted him a writ of coram nobis and vacated his conviction. Korematsu was awarded the Presidential Medal of Freedom in 1998, and died in March 2005.

=== George Stinney ===
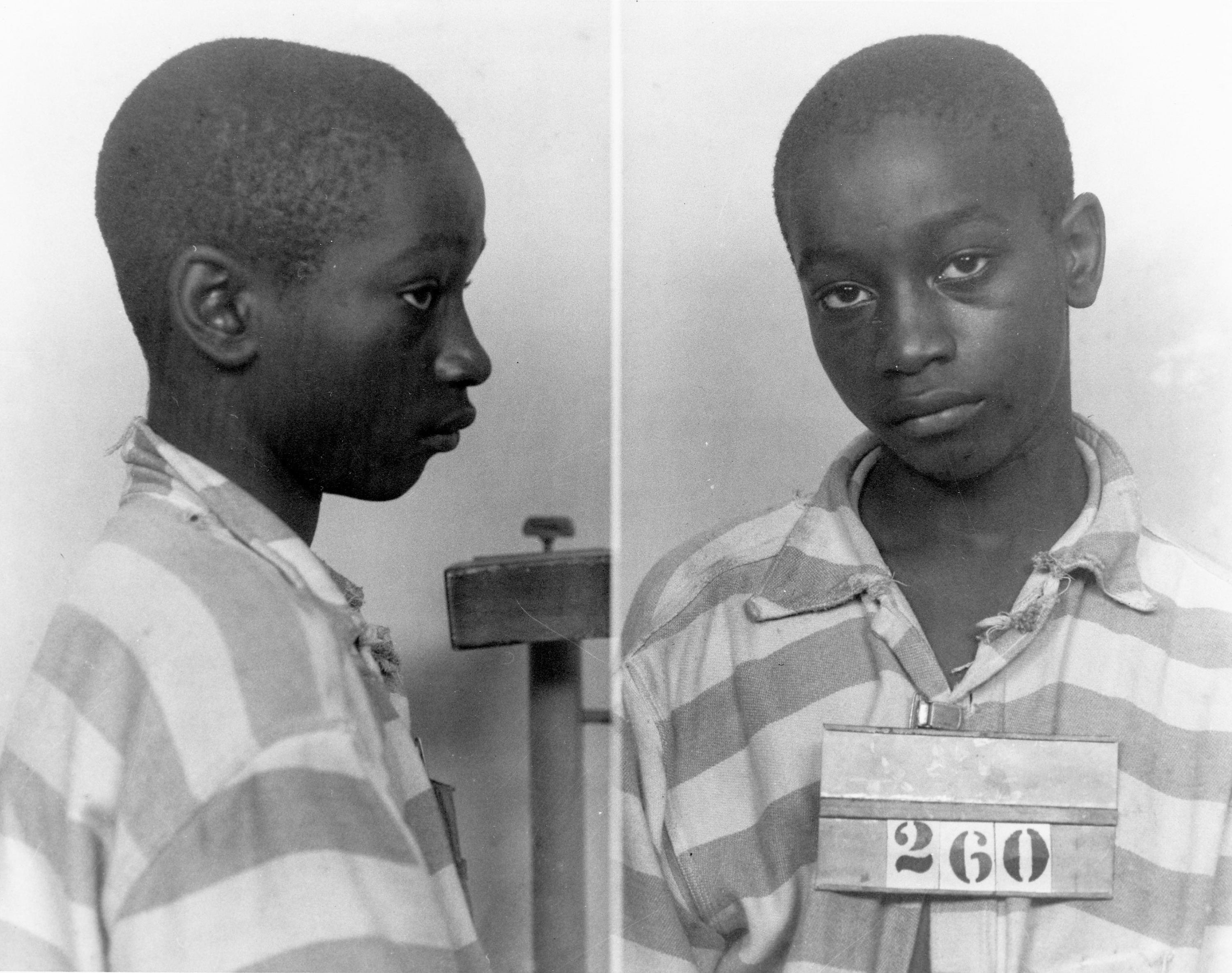
George Stinney

In December 2014, a writ of coram nobis was granted by a South Carolina state court to posthumously vacate the conviction of George Stinney, a 14-year-old black boy who was convicted of murder and executed in June 1944. Stinney was convicted in 1944 in a one-day trial of the first-degree murder of two white girls: 11-year-old Betty June Binnicker and 8-year-old Mary Emma Thames. After being arrested, Stinney was said to have confessed to the crime; however, there was no written record of his confession apart from notes provided by an investigating deputy and no transcript of the brief trial. On June 16, 1944, Stinney was executed as a result. On December 17, 2014, Stinney's conviction was posthumously vacated 70 years after his execution, because the judge ruled that he had not been given a fair trial; he had no effective defense and therefore his Sixth Amendment rights had been violated.

== United Kingdom ==
The common law writ of error contra nobis and its equitable equivalent, the supplemental bill of review, do not appear to have survived the reforms to English law made in the last quarter of the nineteenth century.

Writs of error as a separate proceeding were abolished by section 148 of the Common Law Procedure Act 1852 (15 & 16 Vict. c. 76), which instead provided that "the Proceeding to Error Shall be a Step in the Cause". Error was finally abolished 23 years later in 1875, when Schedule I, Order 58, rule 1 of the Supreme Court of Judicature Act 1873 was brought into force and the Court of Appeal was created.

=== Fresh evidence ===
The modern practice at English law where a litigant seeks to rely upon evidence not known at trial is to bring an appeal.

In civil proceedings, CPR 52.11(1)(b) contains a presumption that civil appeals shall be limited to a review of a decision of the lower court, and CPR 52.11(2)(b) contains a presumption that the Court of Appeal shall not receive fresh evidence. The Court of Appeal will exercise its discretion to hear fresh evidence according to the over-riding objective in civil cases to deal with cases justly: however, three key criteria laid down by the Court of Appeal in Ladd v Marshall continue to be of relevance:

- the evidence could not have been obtained with reasonable diligence for use at the trial;
- the evidence must be such that, if given, it would probably have an important influence on the result of the case, though it need not be decisive;
- the evidence must be such as is presumably to be believed; it must be apparently credible, though it need not be incontrovertible.

Moreover, where it is "necessary to do so in order to avoid real injustice", in "exceptional" circumstances, and where "there is no alternative effective remedy", CPR 52.17(1) permits both the High Court and the Court of Appeal to re-open a final determination of an appeal.

In criminal proceedings, the Court of Appeal also has a discretion to admit fresh evidence on appeal. If it does so, the Court must ask itself whether, in light of the fresh evidence, the conviction is unsafe.

=== Special case of fraud ===
Soon after the passage of the Judicature Acts, it was thought that, when a judgment had been obtained by wilful fraud of the victorious party, the aggrieved party's proper recourse was to bring a new action for fraud, because to try the alleged fraud required original jurisdiction, which the Court of Appeal did not have.

In so ruling, Jessell MR made specific references to the supplemental bill of review, the equitable equivalent of the writ of error contra nobis. However, the Court drew an analogy with the old law, rather than preserving it: in agreeing with Jessell MR, James LJ observed, "if it is true that there was a fraud practised upon the Court, by which the Court was induced to make a wrong decree, the way to obtain relief will be to bring a fresh action to set aside the decree on the ground of fraud" [emphasis added].

Since the coming into force of the Civil Procedure Rules, the law has evolved further. In Noble v Owens, the Court of Appeal held that the modern position is that it is now not necessary to commence a fresh action to cure a judgment fraudulently obtained. Instead, the powers of the Court of Appeal under CPR 52.10 are sufficiently broad to permit the Court of Appeal to refer the determination of the issue of fraud to a Judge of the High Court as part of the appeal proceedings, with a consequent saving of costs.

In criminal cases, the Court of Appeal has allowed appeals and quashed convictions on the basis of misconduct by Crown witnesses analogous to fraud, e.g., where prosecution witnesses had subsequently been convicted for giving perjured evidence during the original trial; or where police officers who took confessions from the appellants had subsequently been discredited in later proceedings.

=== Recent attempts to resurrect the procedure ===
In Cinpres Gas Injection Ltd v Melea Ltd, an unsuccessful attempt was made to resurrect the supplemental bill of review. Jacob LJ, giving the judgment of the Court of Appeal, held that an attempt to invoke the old bill of review could not succeed because, for generations, applications for rehearing on the basis of fresh evidence had been made to the Court of Appeal and, if the bill of review procedure had survived the Judicature Acts, it had long since lapsed. The judge observed that "it would make for better justice in principle for a prior decision to be impugnable on the grounds for which a bill of review once lay, namely that there was fresh evidence not discoverable by reasonable diligence, which 'entirely changes the aspect of the case'" (para. [100]). However, he also observed that the Court of Appeal had not been asked to consider its powers under CPR 52.17 to re-open a final appeal in "exceptional circumstances" and therefore could not say whether such an application would have succeeded.

Moreover, in a Northern Ireland case, Walsh's Application, in which an application was made for a writ of error coram nobis following an unsuccessful judicial review, Weatherup J followed the Court of Appeal in Cinpres by observing, "While the Writ developed at Common Law, I doubt if the procedure survived the appeals process introduced by the Judicature (Ireland) Act 1875", before referring to the provision of that Act dealing with the abolition of proceedings in error. The court concluded that it did not have the jurisdiction to alter the decision made on judicial review.

The above cases indicate that the Judicature Acts and the Civil Procedure Rules provide for a comprehensive system of appeals which effectively ousts the function served by the former bill of review and writ of error coram nobis, which may now be extinct in England, Wales and Northern Ireland.

== See also ==
- All Writs Act
- Audita querela
- Habeas corpus in the United States
- Fundamental error
- Judiciary Act of 1789
- Post conviction
- United States v. Morgan (1954)
