= Post conviction =

Legal process after a trial results in conviction of the defendant

In law, post conviction refers to the legal process available to defendants to challenge a conviction after direct appeals, including collateral appeals. Any process which takes place after a trial and conviction of a defendant may broadly be considered post conviction.

After conviction, a court will proceed with sentencing the guilty party. In the American criminal justice system, once a defendant has received a guilty verdict, they can then challenge a conviction or sentence. In the United States the term post conviction is often used for collateral process, usually a habeas corpus proceeding, while appeal most commonly is a direct review. Some US states also have a collateral appeal process independent of habeas corpus. The goal of these proceedings is exoneration, or proving a convicted person innocent, by obtaining a new trial. If lacking representation, the defendant may consult or hire an attorney to exercise his or her legal rights.

The post-conviction process is in place to protect innocent individuals from inherent human error in the criminal justice system. One study cites 10,000 innocent people are convicted each year in the United States.

== Criminal appeals ==
The appeals process is the request for a formal change of a decision made by a court of law. The litigant who files the appeal is known as the "appellant". A successful appeal must demonstrate to a higher court that the trial court made a decision affected by legal error. The appellate procedure in the United States takes place in appellate court, and that court normally makes its judgment based only on the record of the original case. The appellant generally submits a document of legal arguments called a "brief", a written attempt to persuade the judges of an appellate court that the decision of the trial court should be reversed. If selected for an "oral argument", appellants may present a short spoken argument to the court. No additional pieces of evidence or witnesses are considered.

The ruling made by the appellate court is usually final. The decision of the appellate court generally affirms the original decision of the trial court. However, 10–20% of civil and criminal appeals are successful in reversing the decision of the original trial. If the appeals process is unsuccessful, a convicted person may pursue other options, depending upon the severity of his or her sentence and the crime committed.

== Writs ==
Writs are directives from a higher court to a lower court or government official, and are only issued when the one seeking the writ (the moving party) has no other options.

Federal collateral habeas permits federal courts to review state criminal convictions after those convictions have already been adjudicated through state trial and appellate proceedings, creating an additional layer of review outside the original criminal proceeding. By contrast, direct review occurs through successive levels of review within the same proceeding; remedies such as coram nobis are therefore characterized as direct review, while habeas is collateral to the underlying criminal case.

=== Habeas corpus ===
Habeas corpus is a judicial mandate to a prison official which orders that an inmate be brought to trial to determine whether the imprisonment is lawful and if it should continue. Typically, an inmate will argue that his imprisonment is unconstitutional. While habeas corpus can be filed in state or federal court, all state avenues must be exhausted first.

Many countries, including the United States, Australia, New Zealand, Malaysia and Canada have adopted the practice from English common law.

In the United States federal court system the writ of habeas corpus is used most frequently to review state court convictions. Federal statutes (28 U.S.C. §§ 2241–2256) outline the procedural aspects of federal habeas corpus proceedings.

=== Coram Nobis ===
Error coram nobis is another writ issued only rarely at the federal level in cases of federal criminal convictions when "no other remedy is available".

== Clemency ==
Practices vary from state to state, but the clemency process usually requires the governor or board of advisors or both. Since 1976 273 death row inmates have been granted clemency for humanitarian reasons. These include doubts about the petitioner's guilt or a governor's personal stance on capital punishment.

== Innocence work ==
Overturning a conviction after dozens of appeals and petitions have been denied is notoriously difficult, though prisoners have some options at their disposal. They can still attain freedom if legitimate innocence can be proven. The most common method is by using DNA evidence to disprove a crime that happened before DNA testing was a viable option. The Innocence Project, founded to exonerate those convicted wrongfully, has found more than 300 post-conviction DNA exonerations in the history of the United States. Attorneys can file a motion to introduce strong new evidence to the courts. Other common innocence efforts center on victim recantations if applicable.

== See also ==
- Clemency
- Coram nobis
- Exoneration
- Expungement
- Pardon
- Vacated judgment
