= Fundamental error =

Legal term provided by United States Courts

Fundamental error is a legal term provided by United States courts to describe an error which occurs whenever a judgement violates a federal fundamental right. In United States constitutional law, fundamental rights have special significance under the U.S. Constitution. Those rights enumerated in the U.S. Constitution are recognized as "fundamental" by the U.S. Supreme Court. State courts within the United States may define fundamental error rules independently of the federal courts. State fundamental error rules may include errors which violate rights in additional to those rights guaranteed by the U.S. Constitution, but these rules may not infringe upon federal fundamental rights. Any law restricting such a right must both serve a compelling state purpose and be narrowly tailored to that compelling purpose.

== Judicial errors ==
A fundamental error is a type of legal or judicial error. A judicial error is a mistake by a judge or court. If a majority of a reviewing court, such as an appellate court, finds an error or errors which impacts the result, the higher court may reverse the lower court's error in whole or in part (the entire judgment or a part of it), and remand (send it back) with instructions to the lower court.

There are various types of errors which fall under two groups: harmless errors and plain errors. Errors which have no prejudicial impact on the rights of a party are deemed harmless errors. Higher courts will not reverse or remand the lower court's decision for harmless errors. A plain error is an error that is obvious and affects "the fairness, integrity or public reputation of judicial proceedings". Plain errors are typically reversible errors. Higher courts will always reverse or remand the lower court's decision for reversible errors.

Fundamental errors are both plain errors and reversible errors. Fundamental errors are similar to substantial errors; however, the definition of a "substantial error" may differ slightly among the courts. A fundamental error is consistent among all US Courts as these errors violate the fundamental rights guaranteed by the US Constitution. In other words, all substantial errors are not necessarily fundamental errors, but all fundamental errors are substantial errors.

== Errors affecting fundamental rights ==
Courts often review questions of whether a fundamental error occurred in post-conviction proceedings, such as a direct appeal, the writ of habeas corpus or the writ of coram nobis. Fundamental error, as a rule, is an extremely difficult claim to succeed in an appeal. Congress and state legislatures may enact regulations on these proceeding, such as time limits for the filing post-conviction motions, in efforts to reduce judicial caseloads. In Murray v. Carrier, the Supreme Court ruled that the concept of fundamental error applies to those cases in which the defendant was probably ... actually innocent." The Court then specified that "in an extraordinary case, where a constitutional violation has probably resulted in the conviction of one who is actually innocent, a federal habeas court may grant the writ even in the absence of a showing of cause for the procedural default".

A petitioner may lose the chance to claim a violation of their Fundamental rights if there is a procedural default on the claim. Some procedural defaults include intentionally waiving their right to make the claim, or not filing the claim in a timely manner. If state courts provide adequate means of challenging federal fundamental errors, then a procedural default may not be appealed to a federal court. However, if state courts do not provide adequate means of challenging the errors, then a federal court has jurisdiction to hear the claim. The Supreme Court held in Coleman v. Thompson that a petitioner who failed to comply with a timeliness requirement in a state court could nevertheless plead their claims on the merits in federal court if the petitioner could show that "failure to consider the claims [would] result in a fundamental miscarriage of justice."

== Application in United States Federal Case Law ==
A fundamental error occurs whenever a defendant was probably actually innocent. In Murray v. Carrier, the Supreme Court ruled that the concept of "fundamental miscarriage of justice" applies to those cases in which the defendant was probably actually innocent." That concern is reflected, for example, in the "fundamental value determination of our society that it is far worse to convict an innocent man than to let a guilty man go free".

A fundamental error occurs whenever there is a failure to prove beyond a reasonable doubt every element of the charged offense. In United States v. McClelland, the United States Court of Appeals for the Ninth Circuit held that "the failure to properly instruct the jury on [the required] element of a crime constitutes fundamental error".

A fundamental error occurs whenever a defendant stands convicted of conduct that is not criminal. In United States v. Stoneman, the United States Court of Appeals for the Third Circuit found a fundamental error occurs where a defendant stands convicted of conduct that is not criminal. If a defendant is convicted and punished for act that law does not make criminal, it "inherently results in a complete miscarriage of justice" and presents "exceptional circumstances" which justify collateral relief.

== See also ==
- Actual innocence
- Error (law)
- Miscarriage of justice
