= Hirabayashi Station =

Hirabayashi Station is the name of multiple train stations in Japan.

- Hirabayashi Station (Niigata) in Niigata Prefecture
- Hirabayashi Station (Osaka) in Osaka Prefecture
