= Hirabayashi v. United States =

- Supreme Court of the United States

Argued May 10–11, 1943 Decided June 21, 1943
- Full case name: Gordon Kiyoshi Hirabayashi v. United States
- Citations: 320 U.S. 81 (more) 63 S. Ct. 1375; 87 L. Ed. 1774; 1943 U.S. LEXIS 1109

Case history
- Prior: United States v. Hirabayashi, 46 F. Supp. 657 (W.D. Wash. 1942); certificate from the Court of Appeals for the Ninth Circuit.
- Subsequent: Petition for writ of error coram nobis granted, 627 F. Supp. 1445 (W.D. Wash. 1986); affirmed in part, reversed in part, 828 F.2d 591 (9th Cir. 1987).

Holding
- The Court held that the application of curfews against members of a minority group was constitutional when the nation was at war with the country from which that group originated.

Court membership
- Chief Justice Harlan F. Stone Associate Justices Owen Roberts · Hugo Black; Stanley F. Reed · Felix Frankfurter; William O. Douglas · Frank Murphy; Robert H. Jackson · Wiley B. Rutledge

Case opinions
- Majority: Stone, joined by Roberts, Black, Reed, Frankfurter, Jackson
- Concurrence: Douglas
- Concurrence: Murphy
- Concurrence: Rutledge

Laws applied
- United States Executive Order 9066; U.S. Const.

Hirabayashi v. United States, 320 U.S. 81 (1943), was a United States Supreme Court case in holding that the application of curfews against members of a minority group was constitutional when the nation was at war with the country from which that group's ancestors originated. The case arose from the issuance of Executive Order 9066 following the attack on Pearl Harbor and subsequent U.S. entry into World War II. President Franklin D. Roosevelt had authorized military commanders to secure areas from which "any or all persons may be excluded", and Japanese Americans living in the West Coast were subject to a curfew and other restrictions before being removed to internment camps. The plaintiff, Gordon Hirabayashi, was convicted of violating the curfew and had appealed to the Supreme Court. Yasui v. United States was a companion case decided the same day. Both convictions were overturned in coram nobis proceedings in the 1980s.

== Background ==
After the attack on Pearl Harbor, American public opinion initially stood by the large population of Japanese Americans living on the West Coast, or at least did not openly question their loyalty to the United States. Six weeks later, however, public opinion had turned against Japanese Americans, as the press and other Americans became nervous about the potential for fifth column activity. Though the administration (including President Roosevelt and FBI Director J. Edgar Hoover) dismissed rumors of Japanese American espionage on behalf of the Japanese war effort, pressure mounted upon the administration as the tide of public opinion turned against Japanese Americans.

On February 19, 1942, Roosevelt issued Executive Order 9066, authorizing Lieutenant General John L. DeWitt, as head of the Western Defense Command, to exclude certain persons from "military areas" regardless of their ancestry or country of citizenship. Over the course of several weeks, DeWitt issued several public proclamations that first imposed a curfew upon Japanese American citizens and resident "aliens" of Japanese descent. (The Issei, or first-generation immigrants, were prohibited from naturalized citizenship as members of an "unassimilable" race.) Later orders confined Japanese Americans to Military Area No. 1, which included Seattle, where Hirabayashi lived. On May 3, 1942, DeWitt issued an order requiring Japanese Americans in the Seattle area to report to assigned assembly points for "evacuation" to isolated inland camps. At the time, the terms "relocation centers," "internment camps," and "concentration camps" were used interchangeably.

== Case ==
Gordon Hirabayashi, was a University of Washington student who was accused of violating the curfew and exclusion order. This violation was designated a misdemeanor by Public Law 503, a congressional statute introduced to enforce Executive Order 9066 and any subsequent military orders. Hirabayashi turned himself in for disobeying the curfew at the FBI's Seattle office on May 16, 1942 and announced that he planned to disobey the impending removal order.

After his arrest, Hirabayashi was approached by an acquaintance, liberal Washington State Senator Mary Farquharson, who suggested that he make his case a test case. She organized a support committee for Hirabayashi and served as its secretary-treasurer as the committee raised funds for his legal defense. This support was important in advancing the case, as the ACLU refused to support Hirabayashi.

Hirabayashi was held in King County jail for five months until his trial on October 20. The jury deliberated for just ten minutes before it returned two guilty verdicts, one for the curfew violation and another for the exclusion order, and Hirabayashi was sentenced to consecutive 30-day jail terms. After requesting to serve his time in an outdoor labor camp rather than prison, Judge Lloyd Black instead handed down two 90-day sentences, to be served concurrently at the outdoors Catalina Federal Honor Camp outside Tucson, Arizona. Hirabayashi's lawyers appealed the conviction, and after the Ninth Circuit Court of Appeals in San Francisco declined to rule on the case, it landed in the Supreme Court.

The Justice Department expected a legal challenge to all of the three substantive elements of Roosevelt's and DeWitt's directives with respect to Japanese Americans: curfew, exclusion, and internment. The administration, particularly the Department of Justice and Francis Biddle, sought out test cases that it could use to establish favorable precedent and prepared itself for a case that could challenge the entire internment policy.

The Supreme Court heard both the Hirabayashi case and Yasui v. United States during the 1942–43 term. It released the opinions as companion cases on June 21, 1943 and in both cases upheld the curfew order. Although Hirabayashi had been convicted of two violations, the two sentences had been served concurrently, and so the Justices chose to consider only the curfew, not the more controversial exclusion of Japanese American citizens. Minoru Yasui was "released" to the Minidoka concentration camp on time served, and Hirabayashi, who had been living in Spokane, Washington since he had finished his sentence at Catalina, briefly remained free before being sent to the McNeil Island Federal Penitentiary when he refused to comply with a draft order.

== Later developments ==
This case was largely overshadowed by the 1944 case Korematsu v. United States, in which the Court directly addressed the constitutionality of the removal of Japanese Americans from the West Coast. The Court's opinion in Korematsu cited its ruling in Hirabayashi in upholding the restrictions placed on Japanese Americans.

Hirabayashi is notable also in that the three dissenters in Korematsu, Justices Roberts, Jackson, and Murphy, all voted with the majority or, in the case of Murphy, concurred. An article by historian Sidney Fine published in Pacific Historical Review in May 1964, "Mr. Justice Murphy and the Hirabayashi Case", pp. 195–209, shows how Justice Murphy's initial draft opinion was a vigorous dissent, but that he eventually yielded to the arguments of his fellow justices and issued a concurrence which, in Fine's view, "bore a striking resemblance to the dissenting opinion he had intended to issue." In Korematsu, however, Murphy's dissented vehemently, calling the majority opinion "legalization of racism."

In 1986 and 1987, Hirabayashi's convictions on both charges were overturned by the U.S. District Court in Seattle and the Federal Appeals Court, because evidence arose that the Solicitor General's office (led by Charles H. Fahy) had cited examples of Japanese American sabotage in its 1943–44 Supreme Court arguments that it had researched and knew were all groundless. The United States Court of Appeals for the Ninth Circuit issued the final decision as Hirabayashi v. United States in 1987. In 2011, Acting Solicitor General Neal Katyal officially confessed error in that regard.

In May 2012, President Obama posthumously awarded Gordon Hirabayashi the Presidential Medal of Freedom, America's highest civilian honor.

Eleven lawyers who had represented Fred Korematsu, Hirabayashi, and Yasui in successful efforts in lower federal courts to nullify their convictions for violating military curfew and exclusion orders sent a letter, dated January 13, 2014, to Solicitor General Donald Verrilli Jr. In light of the appeal proceedings before the U.S. Supreme Court in Hedges v. Obama, the lawyers asked Verrili to request the Supreme Court to overrule its 1943 decisions in Korematsu, Hirabayashi and Yasui. If the Solicitor General would not make this request, they asked instead that the United States government "make clear" that the federal government "does not consider the internment decisions as valid precedent for governmental or military detention of individuals or groups without due process of law [...]."

In 2018, the Supreme Court overruled Korematsu in Trump v. Hawaii, with Justice John Roberts' majority opinion stating that "Korematsu was gravely wrong the day it was decided, has been overruled in the court of history, and—to be clear—'has no place in law under the Constitution'" (quoting Justice Robert H. Jackson's Korematsu dissent). Scholars disagreed about whether this constituted "an actual overturning of Korematsu or merely disapproving dictum" until Students for Fair Admissions v. Harvard (2023) confirmed Hawaii "overruled" Korematsu.

== See also ==
- List of United States Supreme Court cases, volume 320
- Ex parte Endo
