= New Worlds, New Lives =

Non-fiction book by Lane Hirabayashi

- Author: Lane Ryo Hirabayashi; James A. Hirabayashi; Akemi Kikumura-Yano
- Language: English
- Subject: Globalization and effects on ethnic identity of nikkei in the Americas and dekasegi in Japan
- Genre: Essay, Investigation
- Published: 2002
- Publisher: Stanford University Press
- Publication place: United States
- Pages: 384
- ISBN: 978-0804744621
- OCLC: 48761340

New Worlds, New Lives: Globalization and People of Japanese Descent in the Americas and from Latin America in Japan (ISBN 978-0804744621) is a 2002 academic book edited by Lane Ryo Hirabayashi, James A. Hirabayashi, and Akemi Kikumura-Yano and published by the Stanford University Press. The volume, edited by three Japanese American anthropologists, was produced by the Japanese American National Museum's International Nikkei Research Project. The same project produced the Encyclopedia of Japanese Descendants in the Americas: An Illustrated History of the Nikkei, and the two books are companion volumes.

The book addresses larger theoretical considerations of individual empirical cases as well as the cases themselves. The book was published in Japanese by Jinbun-shoin in 2006, under the title Nikkeijin to gurōbarizēshon : Hokubei, Nanbei, Nihon (日系人とグローバリゼーション : 北米, 南米, 日本).

== Overview ==
New Worlds, New Lives discusses the effects of globalization on a Nikkei identity, concerning those from the main islands of Japan and those from Okinawa. This discussion of the Nikkei includes those from the Bolivia, Brazil, Canada, Paraguay, Peru and United States, and also the dekasegi, Nikkei who reside in Japan. The editors state that to understand how globalization has affected the Nikkei community one must put together Japan, the originating country, and the overall Nikkei community in a "triadic perspective"; According to the book, the "triadic framework" means examining Japan, the host country, and the ethnic organizations that link the host country and Japan along with the reproduction and maintenance of Nikkei ethnic identities. Yoko Yoshida of the Journal of International Migration and Integration wrote that "The greatest insight one can glean from this book is that only looking at ethnic groups in relation to their host societies does not capture the entire dynamics of the migration experience and the negotiation of cultural identity." Ayumi Takenaka of the University of Oxford argued that the book's chapters "neither address their relationship nor the impact of globalization."

The book considers five results that may occur due to globalization. It may increase the Nikkei identity; erode the Nikkei identity; have no visible impact on the said identity; reduce the prominence of the Nikkei identity by, as Yoshida states, creating "global consciousness"; or generate an indicator of a decreasing Nikkei identity by establishing new "hybrid" identities. Yoshida wrote that the editors of the book "fail to answer fully which outcome has emerged because globalization is never consistently conceptualized throughout this book."

Of the chapters, half only cite their own case studies and do not cite anything else. Jose C. Moya of the University of California, Los Angeles argued that, in those chapters, this results in "a certain parochialism in their inability to engage the broader literature on migration and ethnicity." Keiko Yamanaka of the University of California, Berkeley wrote that before this book was published, there was scarce information about the Japanese in South America in English, and a lot of the information had been published in Spanish, Portuguese, and Japanese, inaccessible to Anglophones.

== Contents ==
The volume, divided into 20 chapters, includes 18 articles. Of the eighteen authors, seventeen are either Japanese or Nikkei. The book's arguments are presented in the second and third sections. The question of conjunction and disjunction of Nikkei identities is presented in sections two and three. Yoshida argued that this was "an interesting way to frame these sections".

Yamanaka wrote that most chapters have general discussions on their topics and are short in length. Yoshikuni Igarashi of Vanderbilt University stated that the average chapter length was 16 pages, and because of the short length the essays "read more like encyclopedia entries than critical essays." Takenaka argued that concluded that "most of the chapters seem to address some aspects of conjunction and disjunction of identities in one way or another" and that the chapters should have been organized by topic or geographic region. Igarashi wrote that the book had organized its nomenclature along country-based boundaries.

There are four chapters that discuss Peru. One chapter chronicle Japanese Peruvian history, covering from the year 1899 to the rule of Alberto Fujimori. Another chapter refers to one opinion poll of Peruvian Japanese conducted in 1989 and another conducted in 1998 and compares and contrasts the two.

There is an essay that discusses the Japanese political empowerment movements in three places: Brazil, Hawaii, and Gardena, California in Greater Los Angeles.

There is also a section where the book discusses the formation of cosmopolitan, hybrid, and transnational identities. Robert Efird of Seattle University stated that the essays by Yuko Takezawa and Makoto Araki examine the boundary of what a "Nikkei" is.

=== Part One ===
The first section is Part One: The Impact of Globalization on Nikkei Identities. It includes two chapters. Prior to those two chapters is the introduction to part one by Eiichiro Azuma.

Harumi Befu wrote "Globalization as Human Dispersal: Nikkei in the World", the introductory chapter, which puts Japanese immigration in a historical context. This chapter is an overview of Japanese immigration from the 15th through the 21st centuries. This chapter argues that the Japanese government encouraged immigration after 1870 in order to relieve pressures of a growing population and Befu believed that the Japanese government had acted in a callous manner towards these immigrants. Befu believes that the emigration policies of Japan had significant influence from the country's desire to gain a prominent position in the international system.

Befu categorizes into three phases the transition of Japanese immigration processes: pre-modern, modernization, and post-World War II. Befu categorizes Japanese immigrants into eight groups: pre-modern immigrants, pre-World War II immigrants, post-World War II immigrants, war brides, multinational businesspersons and their families, Japanese engaging in marriages to foreigners, and who Igarashi calls "those who have forsaken Japan". Befu believes that examining the development of Nikkei communities in relation to the international economic and political structures is the best way of understanding them. Yoshida wrote that "Nevertheless, the rest of the book lacks a consistent and explicit engagement of this theme and the concept of globalization is used differently in the various works."

The second chapter in Part One is titled "The Impact of Contemporary Globalization on Nikkei Identities" and it is written by the volume's three editors.

=== Part Two ===
Part two, titled "Conjunctions of Nikkei Identities," discusses the "conjunction" of a Nikkei identity, meaning maintaining and spreading the identity. Part 2 has eight chapters organized into two subparts: "Community Formations and Linkages" and "The Politics of Ethnic Reproduction: Education and Representation." The introduction to part two is written by Lloyd Inui.

In subpart one, Jeffrey Lesser wrote "In Search of the Hyphen: Nikkei and the Struggle over Brazilian National Identity." This chapter discusses the interaction between Brazilian nationalism and the identity politics of Brazil's immigrant groups. Lesser's chapter chronicles the Brazilian Japanese peoples' attempt to find a place in the world society as the dekasegi can be perceived as foreigners in both Japan and Brazil. The other articles in subpart one are "Licensed Agencies for Relief in Asia: Relief Materials and Nikkei Populations in the United States and Canada" by Masako Uno, "An Approach to the Formation of Nikkei Identity in Peru: Issei and Nisei" by Raúl Araki, and "The "Labor Pains" of Forging a Nikkei Community: A Study of the Santa Cruz Region in Bolivia" by Kozy Amemiya. Amemiya's essay discusses efforts by the Japanese community in the Santa Cruz region to commemorate their history.

The articles in subpart two are ""The Twain Shall Meet" in the Nisei? Japanese Language Education and U.S.-Japan Relations, 1900-1940" by Teruko Kumei, "The Nikkei's Education in the Japanese Language in Paraguay: The Japanese Educational System and Its Influence on the Colonies" by Emi Kasamatsu, "Peruvian Nikkei: A Sociopolitical Portrait" by Amelia Morimoto, and "Pathways to Power: Comparative Perspectives on the Emergence of Nikkei Ethnic Political Traditions" by Lane Ryo Hirabayashi.

Yoshida wrote that "I found that most of the literature cited in the second section lacks a specific link to the theme of globalization and its effects."

=== Part Three ===
The third part, titled, "Disjunctions of Nikkei Identities," discusses globalization-induced "disjunctions" of a Nikkei identity. This part, which has a total of nine chapters, is divided into three subparts: "Gender and Identity," "The Dekasegi Phenomenon," and "Emerging Identities." Richard Kosaki wrote the introduction to part three.

Included in subpart one is "I Woman, I Man, I Nikkei: Symbolic Construction of Femininity and Masculinity in the Japanese Community of Peru" by Doris Moromisato Miasato. Miasato's essay discusses the role of gender in Japanese Peruvian communities. Miasato argues that the Japanese-Brazilian community's patriarchical patterns are hiding a feminine perspective present in the community and that many vital Peruvian Nikkei groups including prefectural associations of kenjinkai. Another chapter compares and contrasts the formations of the Peruvian and United States Nikkei communities in terms of class, nationalism, and race. In addition, the subpart has "Migration as a Negotiation of Gender: Recent Japanese Immigrant Women in Canada" by Audrey Kobayashi. This essay, which chronicles Japanese women who had recently emigrated to Canada, argues for a conclusion similar to that of Miasato's. Igarashi stated that both essays show the importance of women in the Nikkei communities. The next article is "Race, Gender, Ethnicity and the Narrative of National Identity in the Films of Tizuka Yamazaki" by Naomi Hoki Moniz. This chapter discusses the Brazilian filmmaker Tizuka Yamasaki.

The first article in the second subpart is "The Japanese-Brazilian Dekasegi Phenomenon: An Economic Perspective" by Edson Mori. The second article is "The Dekasegi Phenomenon and the Education of Japanese Brazilian Children in Japanese Schools" by Masato Ninomiya. This essay is about children of Nikkei Latin Americans living in Japan and their issues in the Japanese educational system. The third article is "The Emigration of Argentines of Japanese Descent to Japan" by Marcelo G. Higa.

The first article in the third subpart is "The Nikkei Negotiation of Minorit/Majority Dynamics in Peru and the United States" by Steven Masami Ropp. The second is "The Uchinanchu Diaspora and the Boundary of "Nikkei"" by Makoto Arakaki. This essay, a discussion on the specific Okinawan identity, chronicles the use of academic conferences, business conferences, and organizations to create a worldwide Okinawan perspective. The third article is "Nikkeijin and Multicultural Existence in Japan: Kobe after the Great Earthquake" by Yasuko I. Takezawa. It discusses the civil responses to the Great Hanshin–Awaji earthquake.

Yoshida wrote that compared to the chapters of section two, "the chapters in section three more convincingly show how Nikkei communities have been affected by globalization."

=== Part Four ===
The concluding essay is "Retrospect and prospects," written by the three editors of the volume. In this chapter the editors wrote that the primary concern of the book is not the experiences of individual ethnic Japanese but instead with the concept of ethnic Japanese communities being "ethnic reproduction".

== Reception ==
Daniel M. Masterson of the U.S. Naval Academy argued that the book's editors "are to be complimented for this anthology's important contribution to the field of Japanese migration studies."

Moya states that the book is a "commendable effort", but that there is a sense of "conceptual looseness", or a lack of ability to compare the Nikkei of various countries because the authors did not collect and use the same statistics for all Nikkei groups. Moya concluded that "the book contains much that should be of interest to the readers of this journal."

Efird states that "not just essential reading for students and scholars of Nikkei issues" but also is an "instructive [primer] on the contingency of ethnic identity." He argues that the main weakness is "scant attention to the increasing intermarriage between Nikkei and other ethnic groups."

Igarashi argued that while the book's editors successfully created an encyclopedic reference about ethnic Japanese and the recent academic discussions about them, this resource "remains, regrettably, largely unusable because of their fragmented presentation", stating that "the appeal of the collection will likely be limited to a handful of Nikkei readers." Igarashi wrote that the book "reconfirms" the "boundaries of the Nikkei" by trying to create a comprehensive resource and that it is difficult to analyze the cases in the volume due to the amount of information.
