= Kip Fulbeck =

American film director

- Born: Lawrence Keith Fulbeck; April 30, 1965 (age 61); Fontana, CA
- Education: University of California, San Diego
- Known for: Identity Politics, Spoken Word, Video, Slam Poetry, Performance and Ethnic Studies

Lawrence Keith "Kip" Fulbeck is an American artist, spoken word performer, filmmaker and author. Fulbeck's work explores identity politics.

His mixed race ethnic background is English, Welsh, Irish and Cantonese. He is best known for his work addressing Hapa and multiracial identity and as the creator of The Hapa Project.

Fulbeck attended UCLA, Dartmouth College and the University of California, San Diego, where he was a four-year NCAA All-American Swimmer and 1988 Athlete of the Year. He earned his MFA from UCSD in 1992.

== Art ==
Fulbeck's artwork includes video, spoken word, photography and slam poetry. He has exhibited and performed in over 20 countries and has been featured on CNN, MTV, PBS and The Today Show. He has directed twelve films (including Banana Split; Some Questions for 28 Kisses; Sex, Love, & Kung Fu; and Lilo & Me), published four books and keynoted scores of conferences and festivals nationwide. He is a prominent speaker on the college circuit.

Much of Fulbeck's work is autobiographical, combining personal stories with political activism, pop culture and stand-up comedy.

== Exhibitions ==
Fulbeck's group and solo exhibition record is expansive. Group exhibitions include the Whitney Museum of American Art ('93 Biennial), Getty Museum (California Video), Science Museum of Minnesota (Race: Are We So Different?), Singapore International Film Festival, Bonn Videonale, Los Angeles County Museum of Art (Made in California), World Wide Video Festival and Sydney International Film Festival. Solo exhibitions include the Japanese American National Museum (2006 & 2010), Space180 Gallery, Ghettogloss Gallery, A/P/A Institute, Invisible NYC Gallery, the University of North Carolina, the Field Museum, the Oregon Nikkei Legacy Center and the Asia Society Houston.

== Influences ==
Fulbeck studied Visual Arts at the University of California, San Diego with David Antin, Eleanor Antin, Allan Kaprow, Lisa Lowe, Martha Rosler and Phel Steinmetz.

== Published works ==
Fulbeck's first book, a fictional autobiography entitled Paper Bullets was published in 2001 by the University of Washington Press. His second, a photographic book entitled Part Asian, 100% Hapa was published in 2006 by Chronicle Books. It features a foreword by Sean Lennon and an afterword by Paul Spickard. Many of the photographs from this book were featured in a solo show of the same name at the Japanese American National Museum in 2006. The show is currently touring nationally.

Permanence: Tattoo Portraits (also by Chronicle Books) was published in 2008, and features photographic portraits and handwritten personal statements by tattooed individuals from all walks of life including celebrities Margaret Cho, Kat Von D, Slash, Scott Ian, Joan Jett, Tera Patrick, Scott Weiland, Paul Stanley and Jeffrey Sebelia.

Fulbeck's fourth book entitled Mixed: Portraits of Multiracial Kids, was published by Chronicle Books in March 2010 and features a foreword by Dr. Maya Soetoro-Ng and an afterword by Cher. An accompanying solo exhibition exhibited at the Japanese American National Museum.

Fulbeck is represented by the Faye Bender Literary Agency.

== Teaching ==
Fulbeck teaches as a Professor of Art at the University of California, Santa Barbara, where he initiated and taught the first Spoken Word course ever offered as part of a collegiate art program's core curriculum. He received the UCSB Academic Senate's Distinguished Teaching Award in 2009, and has been named an Outstanding Faculty Member four times by the Office of Residential Life. He is also an affiliate faculty in Asian American Studies and Film & Media Studies at UCSB, and has taught as a visiting professor of Asian American Studies at the University of California, Berkeley.

== Additional activities ==
Fulbeck is extensively tattooed, and wears the work of Horitaka, Horitomo, and Horiyoshi III. He is also a multiple national champion and world-ranked masters swimmer, ocean lifeguard, and junior-lifeguard instructor. In 2010, he was named Athlete of the Year by the Santa Barbara Athletic Round Table. He received his black belt in shotokan karate from Steve Ubl. An avid guitar player, he produces videos for the Seymour Duncan company.
