= Exposing Homelessness =

- Directed by: Kerri Gawryn
- Produced by: Kerri Gawryn
- Starring: M. Meissen; Bréyon Austin; Liz Olsen
- Cinematography: M. Meissen; Bréyon Austin; Liz Olsen; John Kiffmeyer
- Edited by: Patrick O'Hearn
- Release date: 2006
- Running time: 20 minutes
- Country: United States
- Language: English

Exposing Homelessness is a 2006 American documentary film created by Kerri Gawryn.

== Production ==
The documentary was conceived by Kerri Gawryn as a graduate thesis project at San Francisco State University, as a collaborative project that would not employ traditional techniques. Rather than simply filming her subjects, she wished them to actively share in the process. Preparing in 2005, Gawryn worked with a mentor whose own studies centered on homelessness and conducted interviews and research. This led to Gawryn's creating the 'Exposing Homelessness Project' as a photography workshop, an art show and finally, the 20-minute documentary.

The film documents the processes of M. Meissen, Bréyon Austin, and Liz Olsen, three formerly homeless women who took part in the photography workshop. The three had been given 35mm cameras and instructed in the art of black-and-white photography. They were then instructed to draw upon their lives and personal experiences and use photography to share insights into homelessness.

== Reception ==
Reviewer Stephanie Wright Hession of San Francisco Chronicle made positive note of the photographic work when she wrote that Meissen's photography was magical, Austin's was poignant, and Olsen's was haunting.

== Screenings and recognition ==
The documentary has screened at the 2009 International Women's Day Film Festival, the 2009 Project Peace Film Festival, the 2008 Women & Creativity Film Festival, the 2008 Women's Caucus Film Festival, the 2008 Society for Photographic Education Film Festival, the 2008 San Francisco Women's Film Festival, the 2008 Finger Lakes Environmental Film Festival, the 2007 Big Muddy Film Festival, as well as at the 2007 Society for Photographic Education National Conference, and the 2006 American Anthropological Association Film, Video and Multimedia Festival.

=== Awards ===
- August 2008, "Pick of the Week" from San Francisco Weekly
- 2008, "Best Local Voice" award from the San Francisco Women's Film Festival
- 2006, "Jean Rouch award" from the Society for Visual Anthropology
