= Tadashi Nakamura (filmmaker) =

American documentary filmmaker

Tadashi "Tad" Nakamura (born c. 1980) is an American documentary filmmaker. He is noted for films about the Asian-American and Japanese-American communities in the United States.

His 2013 film, Jake Shimabukuro: Life on Four Strings, received a 2013 Gotham Award.

== Education ==
Nakamura graduated with a bachelor's degree in Asian-American studies from the University of California, Los Angeles (UCLA) in 2003. He received his MFA in Social Documentation from the University of California, Santa Cruz (UCSC) in 2008.

== Career ==
Nakamura's films focus on the Japanese American experience. Three of his films, Yellow Brotherhood, Pilgrimage, and A Song for Ourselves, form a documentary trilogy about Asian Americans and the importance of community.

His 2013 film, Jake Shimabukuro: Life on Four Strings, is a full-length documentary about Jake Shimabukuro, a Japanese American ukulele virtuoso and composer from Hawaii. The film won the 2013 Gotham Audience Award for Independent Films.

== Personal life ==
Nakamura is a fourth generation Japanese American, born and raised in Los Angeles. His father, Robert A. Nakamura, was also a filmmaker and is sometimes referred to as "the Godfather of Asian American media". His mother is the author and filmmaker Karen L. Ishizuka.

== Filmography ==
- Yellow Brotherhood (2003)
- Pilgrimage (2007)
- A Song for Ourselves (2009)
- Jake Shimabukuro: Life on Four Strings (2012)
- Mele Murals (2016)
- Atomic Café: The Noisiest Corner in J-Town (2020)
- Third Act(2025)
