= Patricia R. Zimmermann =

Film and media scholar

- Born: February 10, 1955
- Died: August 18, 2023 (aged 68)
- Education: University of Wisconsin

Patricia R. Zimmermann (February 10, 1955 – August 18, 2023) was an American festival director, programmer, scholar of home movies, amateur, community, participatory, and orphaned media; documentary and experimental film; film, video and digital history; feminist film theory; transnational political economy and national public policy; and digital cultures theory.

She was the Charles A. Dana Professor of Screen Studies in the Roy H. Park School of Communications at Ithaca College where she had taught since 1981. She was also the Shaw Foundation Endowed Chair at the Wee Kim Wee School of Communication and Information, Nanyang Technological University in Singapore in 2010, where she also taught as a Visiting Professor in 2002–2003. She was also a trainer and facilitator for SHOOT!2007 at the Nigerian Film Institute in Jos, Nigeria, in 2007.

She served on the Board of Trustees for International Film Seminars from 2005 to 2009. She had previously served as a trustee for the Robert Flaherty Documentary Seminars from 1989 to 1994, serving as Vice President from 1990 to 1993. She also served on the advisory boards for Center for African American Archival Preservation, Opera Ithaca, Women Make Movies, Northeast Historic Film, 7th Art Cinema Corporation, University Film and Video Association (UFVA), and Vermont International Film Festival. In addition, she served on the editorial board for Afterimage: The Journal of Media Arts and Cultural Criticism, Film Quarterly, Journal of Film and Video, and The Moving Image.

In 2024, the Flaherty Seminar and Visible Evidence partnered to co-create the Patricia R. Zimmermann (PRZ) Fellowship Fund to help emerging curators, scholars, artists, and historians of alternative and new media to attend either event: "As a connector and builder, Patty was an indomitable force in both our communities. She inspired and nurtured the intellectual and generative processes of so many scholars and artists while remaining curious and open to reinvention. Her legacy as an author, presenter, and visionary thought leader in the film world cannot be underestimated." The PRZ Fellow for the Flaherty Seminar 2024 "To Commune" in Salaya, Thailand was Devika Girish (curator and writer, New York). The PRZ Fellows for Visible Evidence XXX in Melbourne, Australia were Zoe Meng Jiang (Hong Kong University) and Minji Kim (University of Southern California).

== Education ==
Zimmermann completed a B.A. with high distinction at the University of Iowa in 1976, an M.A. in Communication Arts at the University of Wisconsin, Madison in 1979, and a Ph.D. in Communication Arts at the University of Wisconsin, Madison in 1984.

== Festival, exhibition, and magazine ==
=== Finger Lakes Environmental Film Festival ===
Zimmermann was Director of the Finger Lakes Environmental Film Festival (FLEFF), one of the world's longest-running environmental film festivals. With Thomas Shevory, she transformed FLEFF to include new media, installations, live performances, panels, and workshops on a redefined and expanded definition of environmental issues to focus on interconnections between war, air, disease, the land, health, water, genocide, food, education, technology, cultural heritage, and diversity. In 2023, actress and activist Jane Fonda made a video salute to FLEFF for its contributions to opening important discussions.

=== We Tell: Fifty Years of Participatory Community Media ===
In addition to her scholarship on community and participatory media, Zimmermann curated with Louis Massiah from Scribe Video Center the national touring exhibition, We Tell: Fifty Years of Participatory Community Media in 2019. The exhibition focused attention on "the hidden histories of place-based documentaries that situate their collaborative practices in specific locales, communities, and needs for social and political change." Venues included Bloomington, Boston, Chicago, Denver, Houston, Ithaca, Los Angeles, Philadelphia, New Orleans, New York, and Whitesburg.

=== The Edge ===
Zimmermann was Editor-at-Large of The Edge, the online magazine of the Park Center for Independent Media, to which she also contributed numerous articles. Under Editor-in-Chief Raza Rumi, The Edge fills a crucial gap in media: "As an alternative to coverage by establishment journalism, The Edge aims to foster conversations on national and global issues with perspectives from journalists, experts, and students outside mainstream news." Regular contributors include anti-racist feminist and political theorist Zillah Eisenstein; investigative reporter, filmmaker, and columnist Dave Lindorff; Noreen M. Sugrue of the Latino Policy Forum; novelist and filmmaker Alia Yunis; media studies scholars Heidi Rae Cooley, Dale Hudson, and Leah Shafer.

== Scholarship ==
Zimmermann authored and co-authored numerous scholarly books and articles that address urgent issues, including women's rights, war, environmentalism, and the COVID-19 pandemic, that were not always covered in news media or film studies scholarship. Her work has been translated into French, German, Portuguese, and Spanish.

=== Home movies and amateur media ===
Zimmermann's work on home movies opened the academic field of film and media studies to work by amateur filmmakers, something overshadowed by a focus on commercial film industries. She argued for scholars to "take seriously a genre of filmmaking stigmatized as tedious, banal and trite". By studying uses of consumer technologies like 8mm, Super-8, and 16mm cameras, as well as amateur film journals on how to use them, Zimmermann was able to trace a social history of the United States through media made by non-professionals.

She argues that home movies are "not simply an inert designation of inferior film practice and ideology but rather a historical process of social control over representation." Her books Reel Families and Mining the Home Movies, along with her articles on amateur media and digital archives, are "cited time after time." Zimmermann argued: "Hollywood films are the home movies of global capital."

=== Feminist media histories ===
Zimmermann's feminist scholarship looks beyond the erasure of women actors, directors, and producers in Hollywood to look at independent filmmakers and programmers, such as Frances Flaherty, the wife of documentary filmmaker Robert Flaherty. With Scott MacDonald, Zimmermann researched the history of the Robert Flaherty Film Seminar, culminating in their book The Flaherty: Fifty Years in the Cause of Independent Cinema (2017). "Our book restores Frances Flaherty to independent film history. Frances remains crucial to the history of the Flaherty—she created it in 1955 when she was 72 and pushed to keep it going until her death at the age of 88 in 1972."

Zimmermann explains how Frances Flaherty shaped perceptions about documentary and experimental film in the United States through a philosophy that manifested itself in the Flaherty Seminar: "'The Flaherty Way' was an essay that Frances published in the Saturday Review of Literature in 1952. It elaborates her ideas about cinema as a way of seeing the world anew, without preconceptions. […] Her notion of "nonpreconception" was in direct opposition to Hollywood production style, with its pre-planned scripts and hierarchical division of labor, a production practice both she and Robert abhorred. She proffered a more artisanal, humanist, mystical, and poetic view of documentary and cinema in general" The seminar hosts 200 participants each year and keeps audio recordings of discussions, some of which Zimmermann and Erik Barnouw published in a special quadruple issue of Wide Angle in 1996.

She and MacDonald established the organization's history and published other discussions. They faced several practical and conceptual challenges. In an interview with Genevieve Yue, Zimmermann explained: "After confronting the challenge of trying to understand the history of an organization which has its archival source material scattered in boxes and in board members' personal files, and not catalogued, the second challenge was periodization. How can we make sense of six decades of a nonprofit organization?"

=== Documentary and new media ===
Zimmermann also made substantial contributions to documentary studies by expanding the scope of the field. Rather than a narrow focus on feature-length documentaries that screen at festivals and occasionally in theaters, Zimmermann looked at how documentary was being reimagined with digital technologies. The research interest extended her earlier work on threats to public media, outlined in her book States of Emergency: Documentaries, Wars, Democracies (2000). In her new work, she examined emerging media platforms for activist and independent media collectives, including EngageMedia in Australia and Indonesia, Babylon'13 in Ukraine, Abunaddara in Syria, and The Quipu Project in Peru. She participated in the i-Docs Symposium at the University of the West of England in Bristol. The symposium focused on interactive and immersive documentary practices, including web-based documentaries, mobile apps, AR (augmented reality), and VR (virtual reality). She theorizes how documentary is not an object but a conceptual practice in the introduction to Documentary Across Platforms: Reverse Engineering Media, Place, and Politics (2019), which includes three "speculations," which she argues "are created as malleable documents for handouts for students and audiences, live performances, takeaways from lectures, and nonprofits looking for language for grants and project."

Zimmermann had included these new documentary forms as a part of the Finger Lakes Environmental Film Festival since 2007 and had written about them in Thinking through Digital Media: Transnational Environments and Locative Places (2015) and Documentary Habitats: Transmedia Ecologies (2026), both with Dale Hudson. With filmmaker Helen De Michiel, Zimmermann published Open Space New Media Documentary: A Toolkit for Theory and Practice (2018) as a means of bridging the theory/practice divide within film education. More recently, she published a series of articles in Afterimage on polyphony and co-creation, two ways of moving away from she considered a Hollywood model of film auteurs that had taken root in documentary studies, particularly after the explosion of documentary in theatrical release after films like Michael Moore's Bowling for Columbine (2002) on the mass shooting epidemic in the United States and Davis Guggenheim's An Inconvenient Truth (2006), starring former US vice president Al Gore.

== Work with live music and archival film ==
Zimmermann's passion for amateur, documentary, and independent media combined with her passion for music in live performances. She herself played piano and loved Beethoven.

In 2004, Zimmermann was artistic director, producer, and writer of a narrative script for Robert Flaherty's silent 1922 film Nanook of the North. The script was performed by soprano Louise Mygatt in dialogue with electric violin and digital looping by Ritsu Katsumata. It was performed at Ithaca College on April 26, 2004, the 50th Robert Flaherty Film Seminar at Vassar College on June 12, 2004, and at The Museum of Modern Art in New York on June 21, 2004.

Launched as an event in Black History Month at Ithaca College and later performed at the Orphans of the Storm Symposium at the University of South Carolina in 2004, Within Our Gates: Revisited and Remixed included a commission jazz score by pianist Fe Nunn, which was performed by a jazz quartet, along with spoken-word by the Body and Soul Ensemble and the Ida B. Wells Spoken Word Ensemble. Zimmermann explains the objective: "The goal of Within Our Gates: Revisited and Remixed was to create a new way to critically read Oscar Micheaux's film, a way that refused the arbitrary divide between the past and the present, between the analog and the digital. Our creative collaborative was a combination of academics and community-based musicians, artists and scholars who sought to use musical improvisation and spoken word performance to rethink the exhibition of silent film."

Live performances with archival film in collaboration with the Human Studies Film Archives of the Smithsonian Institution include: "Dismantling Empire" (2004) and "Dismantling War" (2005) with Simon Tarr and Art Jones; "The Four Seasons of Astor Piazzolla" (2006) with pianists Jairo Geronymo and Diane Birr, and tango dancers, multimedia remix by Tom Nicholson; "Memescapes" (2007), produced by Anne Michel and Phil Wilde and live music with Judy Hyman, Jeff Claus, Robbie Aceto; and "West Side Story Counterpoint" (2008) with pianists Jairo Geronymo and Deborah Martin, soprano Deborah Lifton and bass baritone Brad Hougham, multimedia design by Phil Wilde and Anne Michel.

== Publications ==
=== Books ===
- Documentary Habitats: Transmedia Ecologies, with Dale Hudson (Bloomington: Indiana University Press, 2026)
- Flash Flaherty: Tales from a Film Seminar, with Scott MacDonald (Bloomington: Indiana University Press, 2021)
- Documentary Across Platforms: Reverse Engineering Media, Place, and Politics (Bloomington: Indiana University Press, 2019)
- Open Space New Media Documentary: A Toolkit for Theory and Practice with Helen De Michiel (New York: Routledge Press, 2018)
- The Flaherty: Fifty Years in the Cause of Independent Cinema, with Scott MacDonald (Bloomington: Indiana University Press, 2017)
- Open Spaces: Openings, Closings, and Thresholds in International Public Media (St. Andrews: University of St. Andrews Press, 2016)
- Thinking through Digital Media: Transnational Environments and Locative Places, with Dale Hudson (New York: Palgrave MacMillan, 2015)
- Mining the Home Movie: Excavations into Historical and Cultural Memories, edited with Karen Ishizuka (Berkeley: University of California Press, 2007)
- States of Emergency: Documentaries, Wars, Democracies (Minneapolis: University of Minnesota Press, 2000)
- Reel Families: A Social History of Amateur Film (Bloomington: Indiana University Press, 1995)

=== Edited special issues and online dossiers ===
- Dossier on Co-creation Documentary During Pandemic and Protest, Visible Evidence Forum, edited with Helen De Michiel (2021)
- 20 on 20: Essays in Celebration of FLEFF, Fingers Lakes Environmental Film Festival (2017), with Stephen Tropiano
- A Festschrift in Honor of Erik Barnouw, co-edited with Ruth Bradley, Wide Angle, vol. 20, no. 2 (1998)
- The Flaherty Film Seminars: Four Decades in the Cause of Independent Cinema, co-edited with Erik Barnouw, special quadruple issue of Wide Angle, vol. 17, nos. 1-4 (1996)
- Soviet and American Documentary Theories, co-edited with Michael Selig, special international issues monograph of Journal of Film and Video, vol. 44, nos. 1-2 (1992)

=== Selected articles and book chapters ===
- "Polyphonic Communities: New Structures for Documentary Ethics," in The Ethics of Documentary Film, ed. Agnieszka Piotrowska (Edinburgh: Edinburgh University Press, 2025): 109–130, with Dale Hudson and Claudia Costa Pederson
- "Augmented Reality in Documentary," in The Intellect Handbook of Documentary, ed. Kate Nash and Deane Williams (New York: Routledge, 2025): 459–478, with Dale Hudson and Claudia Costa Pederson
- "Environments of Race and Place: The Urgencies and Enmeshments of Participatory Community Media," in The Oxford Handbook of American Documentary, ed. Joshua Glick and Patricia Aufderheide (Oxford: Oxford University Press, 2025): 423–445, with Dale Hudson
- "On the Outside Looking In: Perspective on the New Media Documentary in Canada," afterword to The Interactive Documentary in Canada, ed. Michael Brendan Baker and Jessica Mulvogue (Montréal: McGill-Queen’s University Press, 2024): 326–340, with Dale Hudson
- "Overture: Co-Creation Documentary during Pandemic and Protest", Visible Evidence Forum Dossier on Co-creation Documentary During Pandemic and Protest (2021), with Helen De Michiel
- "Media in the COVID-19 Pandemic: Big and High, Small and Low", Jump Cut, vol. 60 (2021), with Dale Hudson
- "Coronavirus Drones Genres: Spectacles of Distance and Melancholia" Film Quarterly Quorum (2020), with Caren Kaplan
- "Co-creation in Documentary: Toward Multiscalar Granular Interventions Beyond Extraction", Afterimage, vol. 41, no. 1 (2020) with Reece Auguiste, Helen De Michiel, Brenda Longfellow, and Dorit Naaman
- "Polyphony and the Emerging Collaborative Ecologies of Documentary Media Exhibition," Afterimage, vol. 41, no. 1 (2020)
- "States of Environmentalist Media", Media + Environment, vol. 1, no. 1 (2019 inaugural issue), with Dale Hudson
- "Thirty Speculations toward a Polyphonic Model for New Media Documentary", Alphaville: Journal of Film and Screen Media, vol. 15 (2018)
- "Beyond the Screen: On Contemporary Feminist Media Re-Articulations" in Indie Reframed: Women's Filmmaking and Contemporary American Independent Cinema, ed. Linda Badley, Claire Perkins, Michele Schreiber (Edinburgh University Press, 2017), with Claudia Costa Pederson
- "Public Domains: Engaging Iraq through Experimental Digitalities", Framework: The Journal of Film and Video, vol. 48, no. 2 (2007)
- "Silent Film Exhibition and Performative Historiography", The Moving Image: The Journal of the Association of Moving Image Archivists (2006) with Anna Siomopoulos
- "21 States of Emergency" in Keyframes: Popular Cinema and Cultural Studies, ed. Matthew Tinkcom and Amy Villarejo (Routledge, 2003)
- "Matrixes of War", Afterimage, vol. 28, no. 4 (2001)
- "Transnational Documentaries: A Manifesto", Afterimage, vol. 24 no, 4 (1997), with John Hess
- "Geographies of Desire: Cartographies of Gender, Race, Nation and Empire in Amateur Film", Film History, vol. 8, no. 1 (1996)
- "Turn Back the Attack" in Socialist Review, vol. 25, no.2 (1995)
- "Fetal Tissue: Reproductive Rights and Amateur Activist Video", Afterimage, vol. 21 no. 1 (1993)
- "Hollywood, Home Movies and Common Sense: Amateur Film as Aesthetic Dissemination and Social Control, 1950-1962",Cinema Journal, vol. 27, no. 4 (1988)
- "Seventeen: Race, Class, Sex and Spectatorship, Afterimage, vol. 13, no. 10: (1986)
- "Independent Documentary Producers and the American Television Networks," Screen, vol. 22, no. 1 (1981)
