= Robert A. Nakamura =

Filmmaker and teacher (1936–2025)

Robert Akira Nakamura (Japanese: 中村 明, July 5, 1936 – June 11, 2025) was an American filmmaker and teacher, sometimes referred to as "the Godfather of Asian American media". In 1970, he cofounded Visual Communications (VC) the oldest community-based Asian Pacific American media arts organization in the United States.

== Early life ==
Nakamura was born in Venice, California, to an Issei father and Nisei mother. He was a graduate of ArtCenter College of Design (B.A., 1956) and the UCLA School of Theater, Film and Television (M.F.A., 1975). He left a successful career in photojournalism and advertising photography to become one of the first to explore, interpret and present the experiences of Japanese Americans in film.

== Filmmaker ==
Nakamura's personal documentary Manzanar (1972) revisited childhood memories of incarceration in an American concentration camp during World War II and has been selected for major retrospectives on the documentary form at the San Francisco Museum of Art and Film Forum, Museum of Contemporary Art, Los Angeles. In 1980, he co-directed Hito Hata: Raise the Banner, considered to be one of the first Asian American feature films, produced by and about Asian Americans. He is the recipient of more than 30 national awards. He was the first to receive Visual Communications' Steve Tatsukawa Memorial Award in 1985 for leadership in Asian American media. In 1994, the Asian Pacific American Coalition in Cinema, Theatre & Television of UCLA instituted the "Robert A. Nakamura Award" to recognize outstanding contributions of other Asian Pacific American visual artists. In 1996, he founded the UCLA Center for EthnoCommunications.

In 1997, the Smithsonian Institution presented a retrospective of his work. Also that year, he created (with Ishizuka) the Frank H. Watase Media Arts Center at the Japanese American National Museum. In 1999, he was named the Japanese American Alumni Professor of Japanese American Studies at UCLA. Nakamura's film Manzanar was preserved by the Academy Film Archive in 2011. In 2022, Manzanar was selected for preservation in the National Film Registry by the Library of Congress.

== Personal life and death ==
Nakamura was married to writer and media producer Karen L. Ishizuka. The couple had two children, one of whom is filmmaker Tadashi Nakamura.

Nakamura died in Culver City, California, on June 11, 2025, at age 88.

== Filmography ==
- Manzanar (1972)
- Wataridori: Birds of Passage (1975)
- Hito Hata: Raise the Banner (1980)
- Fool's Dance (1980)
- Moving Memories (1993)
- Looking Like the Enemy (1995)
- Toyo Miyatake: Infinite Shades of Gray (2002)
