= Lane Ryo Hirabayashi =

American historian (1952–2020)

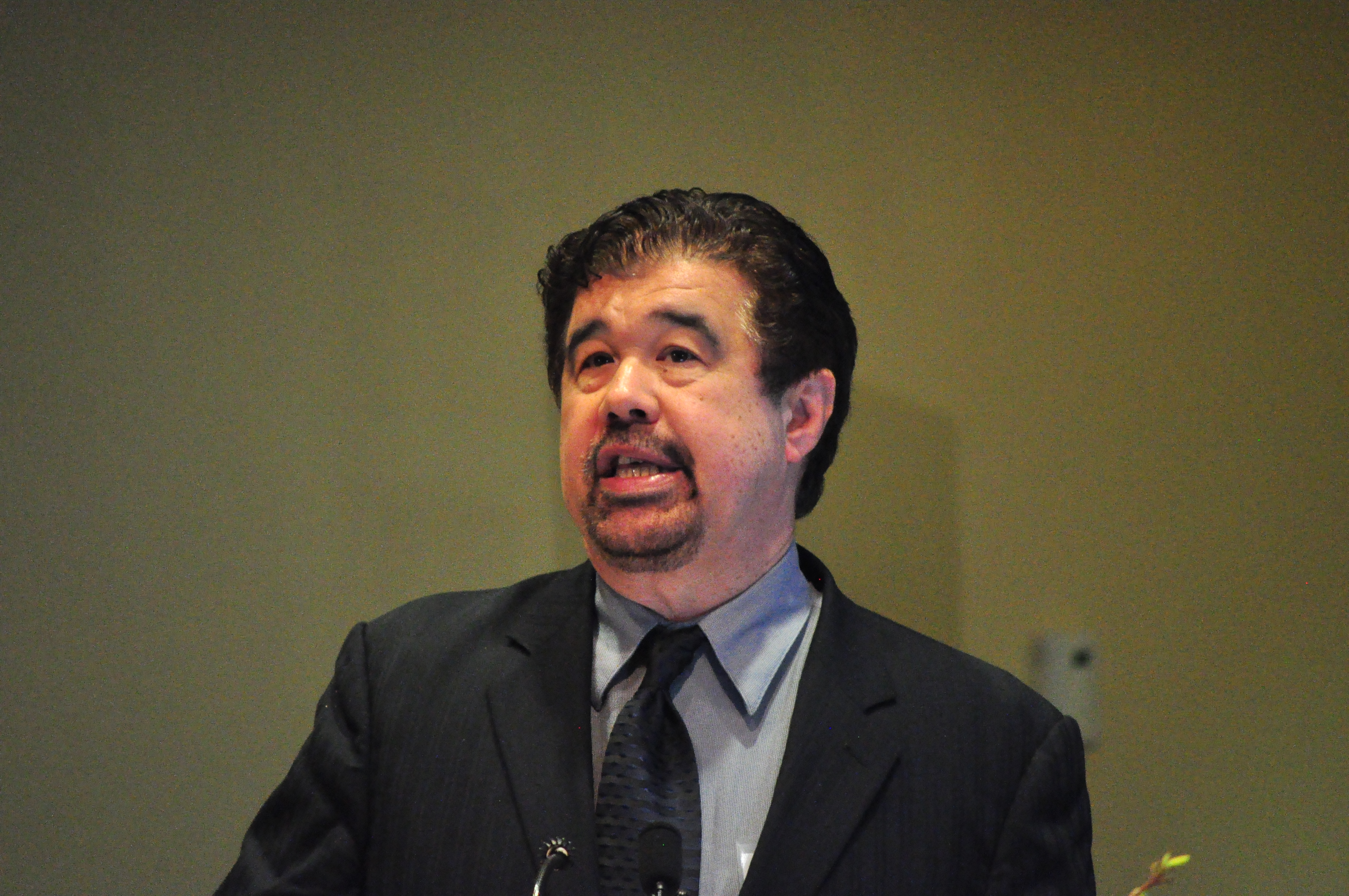
- "Lane Ryo Hirabayashi 01" by Joe Mabel is licensed under CC BY-SA 3.0.
- Born: October 17, 1952; Mill Valley, California
- Died: August 8, 2020 (aged 67); Santa Monica, California
- Relatives: Gordon Hirabayashi (Uncle); Joanne Hirabayashi (Mother); James Hirabayashi (Father); Jan Rice (Younger sister)

Academic background
- Education: Cal State Sonoma; UC Berkeley

Academic work
- Discipline: Anthropology; American history
- Institutions: UCLA; University of Colorado, Boulder; UC Riverside; San Francisco State
- Main interests: World War II internment of Japanese Americans

Lane Ryo Hirabayashi (October 17, 1952 – August 8, 2020) was an American anthropologist and historian who focused on the World War II internment of Japanese Americans. He advocated for more precise terminology in describing the wartime internment of Japanese Americans, recommending the usage of the term "incarceration" rather than government euphemisms such as "evacuation" or "relocation". He also called for comparative research connecting the wartime incarceration of Japanese Americans to other instances of state-sponsored detention.

== Early life and education ==
Hirabayashi was born on October 17, 1952, in Mill Valley, California, where he grew up with his parents and younger sister. His father, James A. Hirabayashi, a sociocultural anthropologist at San Francisco State University, and his uncle, Gordon Hirabayashi, who challenged the wartime curfew and exclusion orders in the 1943 Supreme Court case Hirabayashi v. United States, had particularly strong influences on his academic interests. After a short stint as the guitarist of the Muskadine Blues Band, a local rock group in the Bay Area, he went on to earn his bachelor's degree at Sonoma State University (1974) before pursuing graduate studies at the University of California at Berkeley, where he completed his master's degree (1976) and PhD (1981) in anthropology.

== Academic career and community engagement ==
Shortly after completing his doctorate, Hirabayashi was awarded an Institute of American Cultures postdoctoral fellowship at the UCLA Asian American Studies Center (1981-1982). It was around this time when he began his involvement with various community-based organizations such as the Gardena Pioneer Project and National Coalition for Redress/Reparations, an organization that sought to right historical wrongs by returning money and land taken from Japanese Americans through incarceration during the war.

In 1983, he became a professor in the Ethnic Studies department at San Francisco State University, working alongside his father, who became the first dean of the School of Ethnic Studies after his participation in the Third World Liberation Front Strike. His research methodology took inspiration from his father's, particularly the idea of "cultures of resistance," an approach to social research focused on working with community-based groups seeking to empower ethnic minority populations excluded from mainstream resources and services.

In 1991, Hirabayashi moved to the University of Colorado Boulder, holding faculty positions in the Ethnic Studies and Anthropology departments. At Boulder, he published his first major work, The Politics of Fieldwork: Research in an American Concentration Camp (1999), and began collaborating with the Japanese American National Museum on the International Nikkei Research Project. He then moved to the University of California, Riverside as a professor of ethnic studies from 2003 to 2005.

In 2006, Hirabayashi joined the University of California, Los Angeles as the inaugural George and Sakaye Aratani Professor of the Japanese American Incarceration, Redress, and Community, the first endowed chair in the country focused on the wartime internment of Japanese Americans. He served as chair of the Asian American Studies Department from 2007 to 2010 before retiring in 2017 as professor emeritus, continuing his research until his death in 2020.

== Research and publications ==
=== Terminology and advocacy ===
Hirabayashi argued that government terms such as "evacuation," "relocation," and "internment" were euphemisms that obscured the true nature of Japanese internment during WWII. In his 2015 essay "Incarceration" in Keywords for Asian American Studies, he argued for the adoption of "incarceration" as the new standard term to describe the Japanese American wartime detainment. He was part of a larger academic effort to change the language used in academic and public discussions regarding the wartime experience of Japanese Americans and minority groups as a whole. He also advocated for comparative research connecting the Japanese American wartime experience to the post-9/11 detention of Middle Eastern and Muslim Americans and the imprisonment of political activists of color and prisoners of conscience, arguing that such comparisons could help prevent similar abuses in the future.

=== The Politics of Fieldwork ===
In 1999, Hirabayashi published The Politics of Fieldwork: Research in an American Concentration Camp through the University of Arizona Press. The book examined the case of Tamie Tsuchiyama, an anthropology doctoral student hired in 1942 to conduct fieldwork at the Poston camp in Arizona for the University of California, Berkeley's Japanese American Evacuation and Resettlement Study. The book raised questions about race, gender, and power imbalances in academic research and was reviewed in journals including the Journal of Asian American Studies and Isis.

=== A Principled Stand ===
In 2013, Hirabayashi co-edited A Principled Stand: Gordon Hirabayashi v. the United States, drawing on his uncle Gordon's prison diaries and correspondence. Gordon Hirabayashi had defied the wartime curfew and exclusion orders in 1942, and his case reached the Supreme Court, where the curfew was upheld in a unanimous decision. The case was later revisited in 1987, where his convictions were overturned after evidence showed that the government had suppressed information undermining the claims of military necessity. The book presented Gordon's story from the family's perspective, adding to the documentation of Japanese American wartime resistance.

=== Other works ===
Other notable publications include Inside an American Concentration Camp: Japanese American Resistance at Poston, Arizona (1995), New Worlds, New Lives: Globalization and People of Japanese Descent in the Americas and from Latin America in Japan (2002), and Japanese American Resettlement Through the Lens (2009). Hirabayashi also initiated the "Nikkei in the Americas" book series with the University Press of Colorado in 2012.
