= The Hapa Project =

Art project by Kip Fulbeck

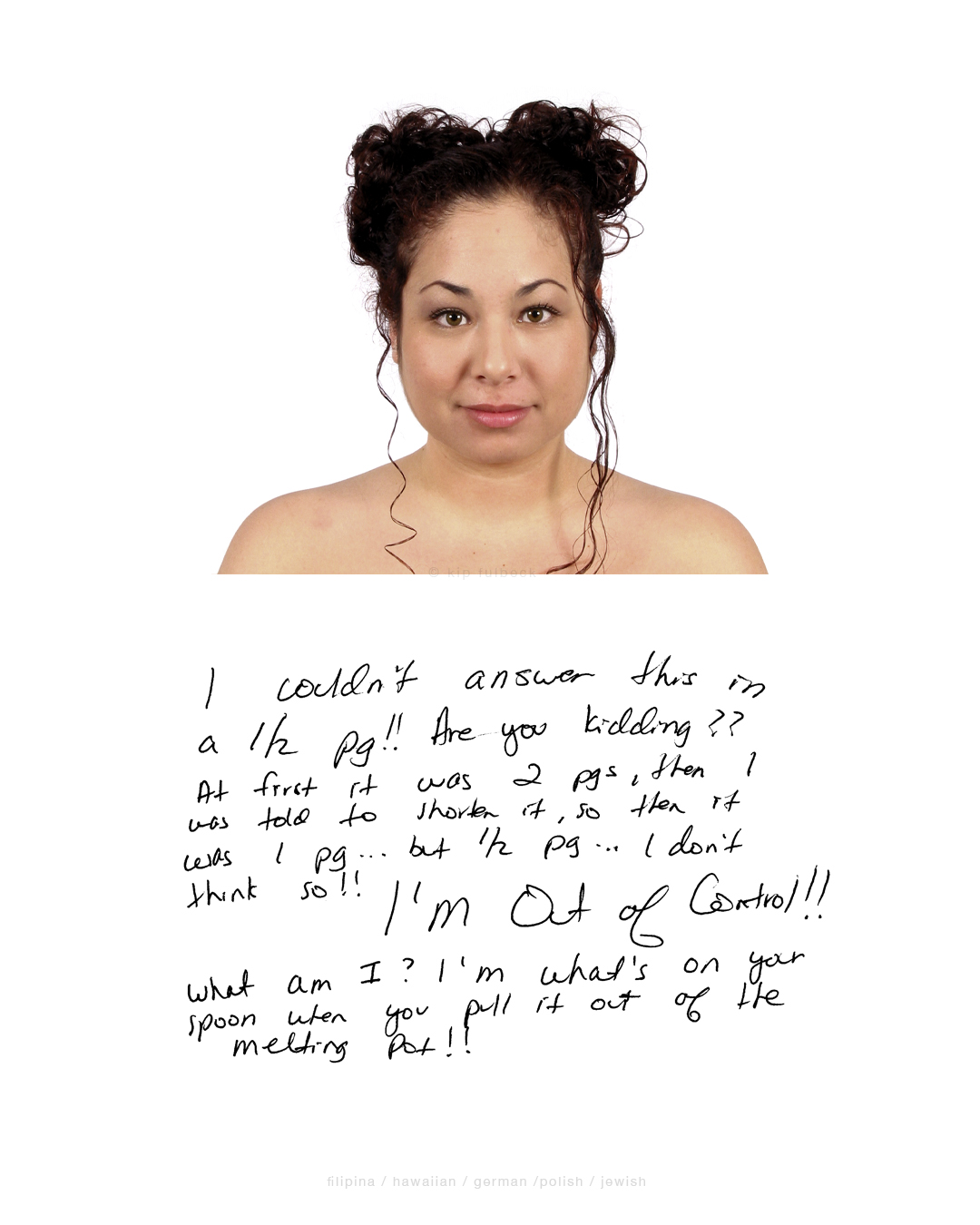
An example from the Hapa Project. The subject is photographed and accompanied by a handwritten, half-page answer to the question, "What are you?"

The Hapa Project is a multiracial identity art project created by American artist Kip Fulbeck. The project embodies a range of media, including a published book, traveling photographic exhibition, satellite community presentations, and online communities.

== Overview ==
Fulbeck began the project in 2001, traveling the country photographing over 1,200 volunteer subjects who self-identified as Hapa (defined for the project as mixed ethnic heritage with partial roots in Asian and/or Pacific Islander ancestry) Each individual was photographed in a similar minimalist style (directly head-on, unclothed from the shoulders up, and without jewelry, glasses, excess make-up, or purposeful expression). After being photographed, participants chose their own racial/ethnic terms to describe themselves, then responded to the question "What are you?" in their own handwriting. The photographs, self-descriptions, and handwritten responses were then combined and displayed as a collection.

Over 1,200 volunteer participants were photographed at dozens of shoots throughout California and Hawaii, as well as Illinois, New York, and Wisconsin.

== Objective ==
The Hapa Project was created to promote awareness and recognition of the millions of multiracial/multiethnic individuals of Asian/Pacific Islander descent in the U.S; to give voice to multiracial people and previously ignored ethnic groups; to dispel myths of exoticism, hybrid vigor and racial homogeneity; to foster positive identity formation and self-image in multiracial children; and to encourage solidarity and empowerment within the multiracial/Hapa community. Fulbeck also notes that a main objective "... was to make the book I wish I owned when I was a kid. I never knew anyone else like me, going through things I went through, not fitting in, always having to choose sides ... Identity is a personal process and I’m adamant that it should be a personal decision, not one made by a community, a government or others."

== Use of race as identifier ==
Fulbeck states that despite its utilization of common racial classifications, The Hapa Project is fundamentally a project about identity rather than a project about race: "It's about identity using race as a starting point." He argues that race in itself is not biologically determined, but socially created: "For the record, race is not a scientifically sound assumption. For example, there is no DNA difference between human beings. We are all African. Biologically, race does not exist. It is a social and cultural construct ... The U.S. is a country with a long history of social genocide (Native Americans, African slavery, etc.) and this was all due to the seeming differences we attributed to race. Yes, it is very convenient to categorize people according to race. It is also extremely inaccurate, however."

== Conceptual strategies ==
The Hapa Project at the Japanese American National Museum

The Hapa Project at the Japanese American National Museum

The use of a clinical photographic style combined with the listing of the subject's ethnic heritage alongside their image visually quotes from various pseudo-scientific 18th and 19th century racial studies of Carl Linnaeus, Johann Friedrich Blumenbach, and Arthur de Gobineau [See: Spickard, Paul, Almost All Aliens, Routledge, New York, NY 2007] However, Fulbeck's decision to have the subjects self-designate their ethnicity and to include their individual handwritten statements counters this methodology, giving ownership and responsibility to the subjects themselves. As historian Paul Spickard writes, "Kip Fulbeck is using the pictures to provoke and encourage his readers. He is using the old form, but with exactly opposite content." [See: Fulbeck, Kip, Part Asian, 100% Hapa, Chronicle Books, San Francisco 2006, p. 261]

The project also plays upon and critiques the official photographs each person has taken for their driver's licenses, passports and other forms of identification.

A further strategy aimed at diminishing the power dynamic between photographer/subject was to have each participant choose their own image, with the option of re-photographing them if they desired. Fulbeck states, "... every participant not only got to write their statement the way they wanted to, they also got to pick their own image. A camera is a tremendously powerful tool and the power dynamic between photographer and subject is palpable. For this reason, I wanted to give some of the power back to the subjects. It was never going to be completely democratic – it is, after all, my concept, my project, and my design – but there are some strategies you can employ to make it less unilateral. Everyone got to see their image and choose to keep it or erase it and shoot again." One participant was re-photographed 27 times.

== Offshoot projects ==
Numerous schools and community organizations have created similar projects inspired by Fulbeck's work.

== Exhibition history ==
Participatory component of The Hapa Project

The Hapa Project publicly premiered in 2006 at the Japanese American National Museum with a 5-month solo exhibition entitled "kip fulbeck: part asian, 100% hapa." The work has also exhibited at Space180 Gallery (San Francisco), Mandeville Gallery (New York), The Field Museum, University of North Carolina, Oakland University, Northern Arizona University, Santa Clara University, and Woodward Academy, among others. Sixteen images from the series are included in the Science Museum of Minnesota's exhibition Race: Are We So Different? currently touring nationally.

Many of the exhibitions include a participatory component where visitors can take part in the project by having their picture taken and writing an individual statement.

== Public attention ==
The project has received both national and international news coverage, being featured on CNN, MTV, PBS, NPR, and Voice of America. Major newspapers covering the project include The Los Angeles Times, Orange County Register, and Kyoto Journal. It has also been featured on dozens of websites exploring race and identity in the U.S.

== Book ==
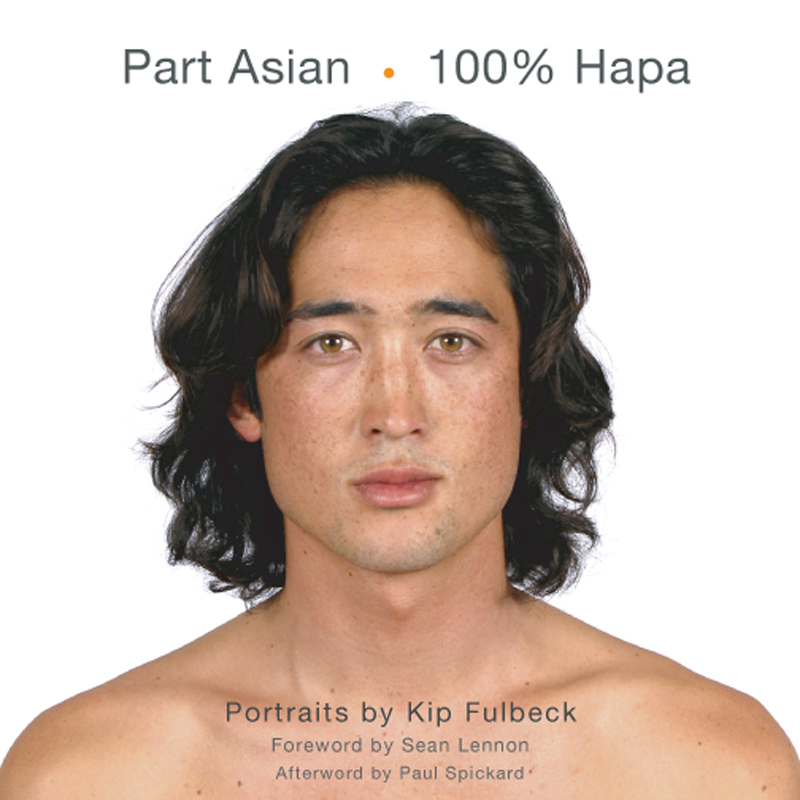
Part Asian, 100% Hapa (Chronicle Books)

A book based on the project entitled Part Asian, 100% Hapa was published by Chronicle Books in 2006. It features a foreword by musician Sean Lennon and an afterword by historian Paul Spickard.

The book includes portraits and statements from approximately 10% of the overall project participants. Fulbeck has discussed the difficulties in selecting these images from the overall pool, as well the problematic of selecting a single image for the book cover. He also has written about the conscious decision to dispel stereotypes of Hapa people all being conventionally attractive.

== Influences ==
Fulbeck cites photographer Jim Goldberg and comic artist Lynda Barry as specifically influential to the creation of the project. Lynda Barry also participated in the project and is included in Part Asian, 100% Hapa. Fulbeck also credits historian Paul Spickard as a major influence, particularly his book Mixed Blood: Intermarriage & Ethnic: Intermarriage And Ethnic Identity In Twentieth Century America (University of Wisconsin Press, 1991) [See: Fulbeck, Kip, Part Asian, 100% Hapa, Chronicle Books, San Francisco 2006, pp. 8, 55, 259].

== Anonymity and celebrity ==
Participant names are listed alphabetically in both the photographic exhibition and book (without index to individual images). Fulbeck chose participant anonymity both for the safety of the children and as a thematic strategy. "...I wanted participants to have as blank a slate as possible to work with, to not be burdened by any pre-existing identifiers. It’s interesting with celebrities, because celebrities without their gear – their look or environment or entourage – don’t look like celebrities. They look like people. And that’s what I wanted. I could photograph Cher this way and she’d look like a regular person."

Celebrities in the project include Lynda Barry, Wuv Bernardo, Asia Carrera, Karen David, Amy Hill, Sean Lennon, Liz Masakayan, Greg Pak, Sonny Sandoval, and Sandra Tsing Loh.

== Emerging patterns ==
Two-thirds of the project volunteers were part Japanese-American. An overwhelming majority of participants were female, including some shoots where women outnumbered men 20:1.

== Current work ==
Fulbeck followed Part Asian, 100% Hapa with the publication of Permanence: Tattoo Portraits by Kip Fulbeck in 2008 and Mixed: Portraits of Multiracial Kids in 2010 (both by Chronicle Books). Both books also had accompanying solo exhibitions. A major speaker on the college circuit, Fulbeck has spoken on The Hapa Project at hundreds of campuses throughout the U.S. He is represented by The Creative Artists Agency in Los Angeles.

== See also ==
- Hapa
- Multiracial
- Mixed Race Day
- Race of the Future
