= Louis Massiah =

American filmmaker

- Education: Cornell University; Massachusetts Institute of Technology
- Occupations: Documentary filmmaker and community activist
- Awards: MacArthur Prize

Louis J. Massiah is an American documentary filmmaker, MacArthur Prize winner, and community activist who has worked with Philadelphians to develop filmmaking skills and to access media resources in order to record their own stories.

== Background ==
Massiah graduated from Cornell University with a B.A. degree, and from Massachusetts Institute of Technology with an M.S. in documentary filmmaking.

He has been an artist-in-residence and on faculty at City College of New York, Princeton University, Ithaca College, the University of Pennsylvania, American University, Haverford College, and most recently at Swarthmore College and Temple University.

Massiah is the founder and executive director of the Scribe Video Center, a media arts center providing educational workshops for community groups and emerging independent media makers. Since 2005, he has served as executive producer of Precious Places, a Philadelphia video history project that tells histories of the city's communities as a collection short films conceived and produced by community members. With funding from the Pew Center for Arts & Heritage, he also directed a community film history project in 2014 called Muslim Voices of Philadelphia, which explored the history of Philadelphia's diverse Muslim communities (including Sufis, Sunnis, the Nation of Islam, the Ahmadis, the Moorish Science Temple of America, and others) through a series of short films.

Discussing the goals and achievement of the Scribe Video Center in a program for the Finger Lakes Environmental Film Festival (FLEFF) in 2020, Massiah described it as an effort of "participatory community video", which responded to issues such as gentrification and low-income housing shortages while aiming to develop new understandings of place and history, new visions of what the community can be, and new plans for civic engagement. He noted that he had worked with UNICEF to establish similar programs in Haiti and Jamaica.

== Awards ==
- 1996: MacArthur Fellows Program
- 1990, 1996: Tribeca Film Institute Fellow
- 2009: Fleisher Founder's Award

== Filmography ==
- The Bombing of Osage Avenue (producer/director), 1986
- Power! (co-producer/writer/director), 1990
- A Nation of Law? (co-producer/writer/director), 1990
- W.E.B. Du Bois: A Biography in Four Voices, 1996
- Louise Thompson Patterson: In Her Own Words, 1996. A short film about activist Louise Thompson Patterson
- A is for Anarchist, B is for Brown, 2002 (producer)
- How to Make A Flower: La Méthode MOBO, 2020 (director)
- TCB-The Toni Cade Bambara School of Organizing, 2025 (producer and co-director)
