= Yasuko I. Takezawa =

Japanese cultural anthropologist

Yasuko I. Takezawa (竹沢泰子; born 1957) is a Japanese cultural anthropologist who researches race, ethnicity, and immigration in the United States, Japan, and other countries. She is a professor of cultural anthropology and sociology at the Intercultural Research Institute of Kansai Gaidai University.

== Career ==
Takezawa is a professor emerita of cultural anthropology and sociology at Kyoto University. She is a director and professor of Intercultural Research Institute, Kansai Gaidai University. She specializes in the study of race, ethnicity, and immigration, particularly in the United States and Japan. A distinguishing concern of Takezawa’s research is that race is not a modern Western construction but a construction emanating from the Middle Ages at least in Europe and Japan.

She is the author of Breaking the Silence: Ethnicity and Redress among Japanese Americans (1995) which was one of the finalists of Victor Turner Prize of the American Anthropological Association. Its Japanese version, 新装版 日系アメリカ人のエスニシティ (Transformation of Japanese American Ethnicity; 1994), won the Shibusawa Award of the Japanese Ethnological Society (now the Japanese Association of Cultural Anthropology).

== Selected works ==
=== Books ===
==== As author ====
- 新装版 日系アメリカ人のエスニシティ (1994) ISBN 9784130560450
- Breaking the Silence: Ethnicity and Redress among Japanese Americans (1995) ISBN 9780801429859

==== As editor ====
- Racial Representations in Asia (2011) ISBN 9784876985517
- Trans-Pacific Japanese American Studies: Conversations on Race and Racializations (2016; co-edited with Gary Y. Okihiro) ISBN 9780824887421
- Kantaiheiyō chiiki no idō to jinshu : tōchi kara kanri e sōgū kara rentai e (Migration and Race in the Trans-Pacific Region) (2019; co-edited with Akio Tanabe and Ryuichi Narita) ISBN 9784814002481
- Hyokka Ryoran: Hyogo Tabunkakyōsei no 150 nen no Ayumi. (A History of 150 Years Old Multicultural Coexistence in Hyogo Prefecture) (2021; co-edited with Daisuke Higuchi, and Hyoto International Association)
- Race and Migration in the Transpacific (2023; co-edited with Akio Tanabe) ISBN 9781003266396
- Visibilities and Invisibilities of Race and Racism Toward a New Global Dialogue (2025; co-edietd with Faye V. Harrison and Akio Tanabe)) ISBN 9781032566863

=== Articles ===
- Takezawa, Yasuko I. (1991). "Children of inmates: The effects of the redress movement among third generation Japanese Americans". Qualitative Sociology. 14 (1): 39–56. doi:10.1007/bf00989533. ISSN 0162-0436. S2CID 143681066.
- Takezawa, Yasuko (2005). "Transcending the Western paradigm of race" (PDF). Japanese Journal of American Studies. 16: 5–30. Archived from the original (PDF) on 2019-08-03.
- Takezawa, Yasuko; et al. (December 2014). "Human genetic research, race, ethnicity and the labeling of populations: recommendations based on an interdisciplinary workshop in Japan". BMC Medical Ethics. 15 (1). doi:10.1186/1472-6939-15-33. PMC 4018961.
- Iwabuchi, Koichi; Takezawa, Yasuko (2015). "Rethinking race and racism in and from Japan". Japanese Studies. 35 (1): 1–3. doi:10.1080/10371397.2015.1044153. ISSN 1037-1397. S2CID 142467386.
- Takezawa, Yasuko (2015). "Translating and Transforming 'Race': Early Meiji Period Textbooks". Japanese Studies. 35 (1): 5–21. doi:10.1080/10371397.2015.1041219. hdl:2433/201836. ISSN 1037-1397. S2CID 58915205.
- Takezawa, Yasuko (2017). "Antiracist Knowledge Production: Bridging Subdisciplines and Regions". American Anthropologist. 119 (3): 538–540. doi:10.1111/aman.12921.
- Takezawa, Yasuko; Kina, Laura (2019-09-02). "Trans-Pacific Japanese Diaspora Art: Encounters and Envisions of Minor-Transnationalism". Amerasia Journal. 45 (3): 373–376. doi:10.1080/00447471.2019.1721648. ISSN 0044-7471. S2CID 212900666.
- Takezawa, Yasuko (2 September 2019). "Encounters with Transmigrants and a Navaho Chef: Yoko Inoue". Amerasia Journal. 45 (3): 391–395. doi:10.1080/00447471.2019.1721669. S2CID 214380689.
- Takezawa, Yasuko; Kina, Laura (6 July 2020). "Trans-Pacific Minor Visions in Japanese Diasporic Art". Asian Diasporic Visual Cultures and the Americas. 6 (1–2): 1–10. doi:10.1163/23523085-00601001.
- Takezawa, Yasuko (6 July 2020). "Major and Minor Transnationalism in Yoko Inoue's Art". Asian Diasporic Visual Cultures and the Americas. 6 (1–2): 27–47. doi:10.1163/23523085-00601003. S2CID 225542800.
- Takezawa, Yasuko (10 December 2020). "Racialization and discourses of "privileges" in the Middle Ages: Jews, "Gypsies", and Kawaramono". Ethnic and Racial Studies. 43 (16): 193–210. doi:10.1080/01419870.2020.1745255. hdl:2433/255376.
- Takezawa, Yasuko (19 February 2021). "Book Review of In search of our frontier: Japanese America and settler colonialism in the construction of Japan's borderless empire". Ethnic and Racial Studies. 44 (3): 520–522. doi:10.1080/01419870.2020.1759812. S2CID 219437090.
- Takezawa, Yasuko; Small, Stephen (14 March 2022). "Theorizing People of Mixed Race in the Pacific and the Atlantic". Social Sciences. 11 (3): 124. doi:10.3390/socsci11030124. ISSN 2076-0760.
- Takezawa, Yasuko (2023). "Preface to the Special Issue on Genetics, DTC, and Their Social Implications". Anthropological Science. 131 (1): 1–2. doi:10.1537/ase.221214.
- Nagai, Kentaro; Tanaka, Mikihito; Marcon, Alessandro R.; Shineha, Ryuma; Tokunaga, Katsushi; Caulfield, Timothy; Takezawa, Yasuko (2023). "Comparing direct-to-consumer genetic testing services in English, Japanese, and Chinese websites". Anthropological Science. 131 (1): 3–13. doi:10.1537/ase.220905.
