= Hapa =

Hawaiian term for mixed ethnicity

Hapa (/ˈhɑːpə/, Hawaiian pronunciation: [ˈhɐpə]) is a Hawaiian word for someone of multiracial ancestry. In Hawaii, the word refers to any person of mixed ethnic heritage, regardless of the specific mixture. The term is used for any multiracial person of partial East Asian, Southeast Asian, or Pacific Islander mixture in California. In what can be characterized as trans-cultural diffusion or the wave model, this latter usage has also spread to Massachusetts, Ohio, and Oregon. Both uses are concurrent. (Note: "Asian or Pacific Islander (API)" was a US Census classification prior to the 2000 US Census subsequently separated into two categories: "Asian" and "Native Hawaiian or Other Pacific Islander".)

== Historical and Hawaiian usage ==
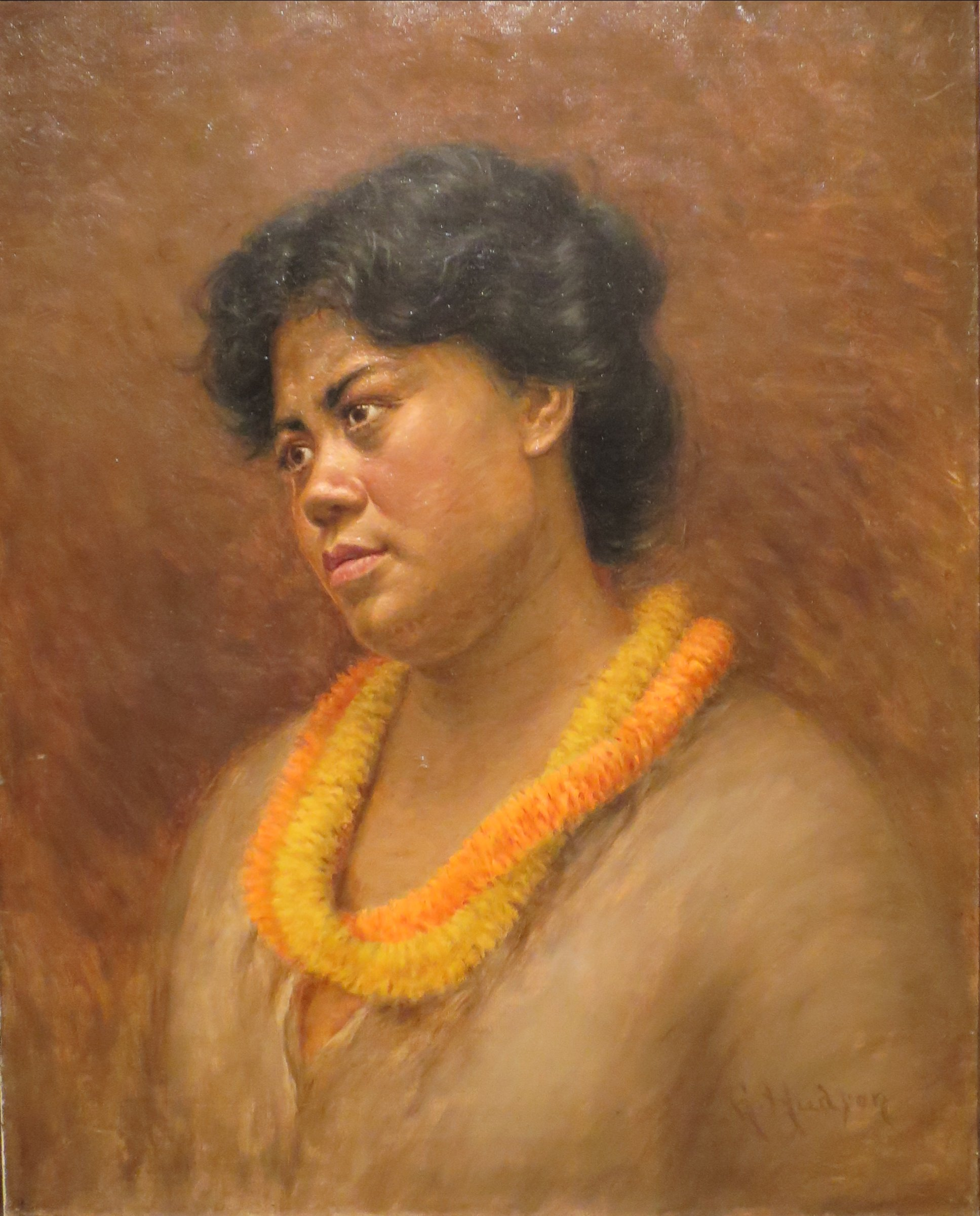
Hapa Haole (No. 206) by Grace Hudson, 1901

The word "hapa" entered the Hawaiian language in the early 1800s, with the arrival of Christian missionaries who instituted a Hawaiian alphabet and developed curriculum for schools. It is a transliteration of the English word "half," but quickly came to mean "part," which could be combined with numbers to form fractions. For example, hapalua is half, hapahā is one-fourth, and hapanui means majority.

In Hawaii, the term can be used in conjunction with other Hawaiian racial and ethnic descriptors to specify a particular racial or ethnic mixture. An example of this is hapa haole (part European/White).

Pukui states that the original meaning of the word haole was "foreigner." Therefore, all non-Hawaiians can be called haole. In practical terms, however, the term is used as a racial description for whites, with the specific exclusion of Portuguese. Portuguese are traditionally considered to be a separate race in Hawaii.

Hapa-haole also is the name of a type of Hawaiian music in which the tune, styling, and/or subject matter is Hawaiian, but the lyrics are partly, mostly, or entirely in English. Many hapa-haole songs had their musical roots in the Western tradition, and the lyrics were in some combination of English and Hawaiian; these songs first gained popularity outside the Territory of Hawaii beginning in 1912–1915, and include titles such as "My Little Grass Shack in Kealakekua" and "Sweet Leilani."

Hapa haole is also used for Hawaiian-language hula songs that are partly in English, thus disqualifying them as "authentic" Hawaiian hula in some venues such as the Merrie Monarch Festival.

== Controversy ==
Some see the use of the term to refer to mixed Asian people without any connections to Hawaii as a misappropriation of Hawaiian culture, but there are kamaʻāina and Kānaka Maoli who see it as hypocritical to protest anyone using what was originally taken from another culture to begin with.

Still others take a stronger stand in discouraging its usage and misuse as they consider the term to be vulgar and racist.

However, the term, unlike other words referring to mixed-race people, has never been a derogatory term when it is used in its original Hawaiian context, although there is some debate about appropriate usage outside this context. As Wei Ming Dariotis states, "'Hapa' was chosen because it was the only word we could find that did not really cause us pain. It is not any of the Asian words for mixed Asian people that contain negative connotations either literally (e.g. 'children of the dust,' 'mixed animal') or by association (Eurasian)."

== In popular culture ==
In 2010, a film called One Big Hapa Family was released about Japanese Canadians.

== See also ==
- Afro-Asians
- Amerasian
- Asian American
- Asian Canadian
- Filipino mestizo
- Filipino people of Spanish ancestry
- Hāfu
- Hun-Xue-Er
- Luk khrueng
- Multiracial
- Multiracialism
- Race of the future
- The Hapa Project
- Third culture kid

== Sources ==
=== Books ===
- Huynh-Hohnbaum, Anh-Luu T.; Yoo, Grace J. (2009). "Multiracial Asians and Pacific Islanders". In Chen, Wen-Chu; Yoo, Grace J. (eds.). Encyclopedia of Asian American Issues Today. Vol. 1. Greenwood Pub Group. pp. 437–443. ISBN 978-0313347511. OCLC 422757556.

=== Journal articles ===
- Bernstein, Mary; De la Cruz, Marcie (2009). ""What are You?": Explaining Identity as a Goal of the Multiracial Hapa Movement". Social Problems. 56 (4): 722–745. doi:10.1525/sp.2009.56.4.722. JSTOR 10.1525/sp.2009.56.4.722.
- Easley, Allen Ken (1995). "Of Children's Plates, Melting Pots, Tossed Salads and Multiple Consciousness: Tales from a Hapa Haole". UCLA Asian Pacific American Law Journal. 3 (1): 75–80.
- Ozaki, C. Casey; Johnston, Marc (2009). "The space in between: Issues for multiracial student organizations and advising". New Directions for Student Services. 2008 (123): 53–61. doi:10.1002/ss.286.
- Taniguchi, Angela S.; Heidenreich, Linda (June 28, 2006). "Re-Mix: Rethinking the use of Hapa in Mixedrace Asian/Pacific Islander American Community Organizing". Research Exchange. McNair Journal.

=== Articles ===
- Dariotis, Wei Ming (2007). "Hapa: The Word of Power". Mixed Heritage Center. Archived from the original on July 6, 2018.
- Johnson, Akemi (2016). "Who Gets To Be 'Hapa'?". NPR.

=== Videos ===
- NeSmith, Richard Keao (2018). "The Etymology of Hapa". Japanese American National Museum. Event occurs at 44:35-45:10.
