= Japanese American National Museum =

Museum in Los Angeles, California, US

Coordinates: 34°2′58.7″N 118°14′18.9″W

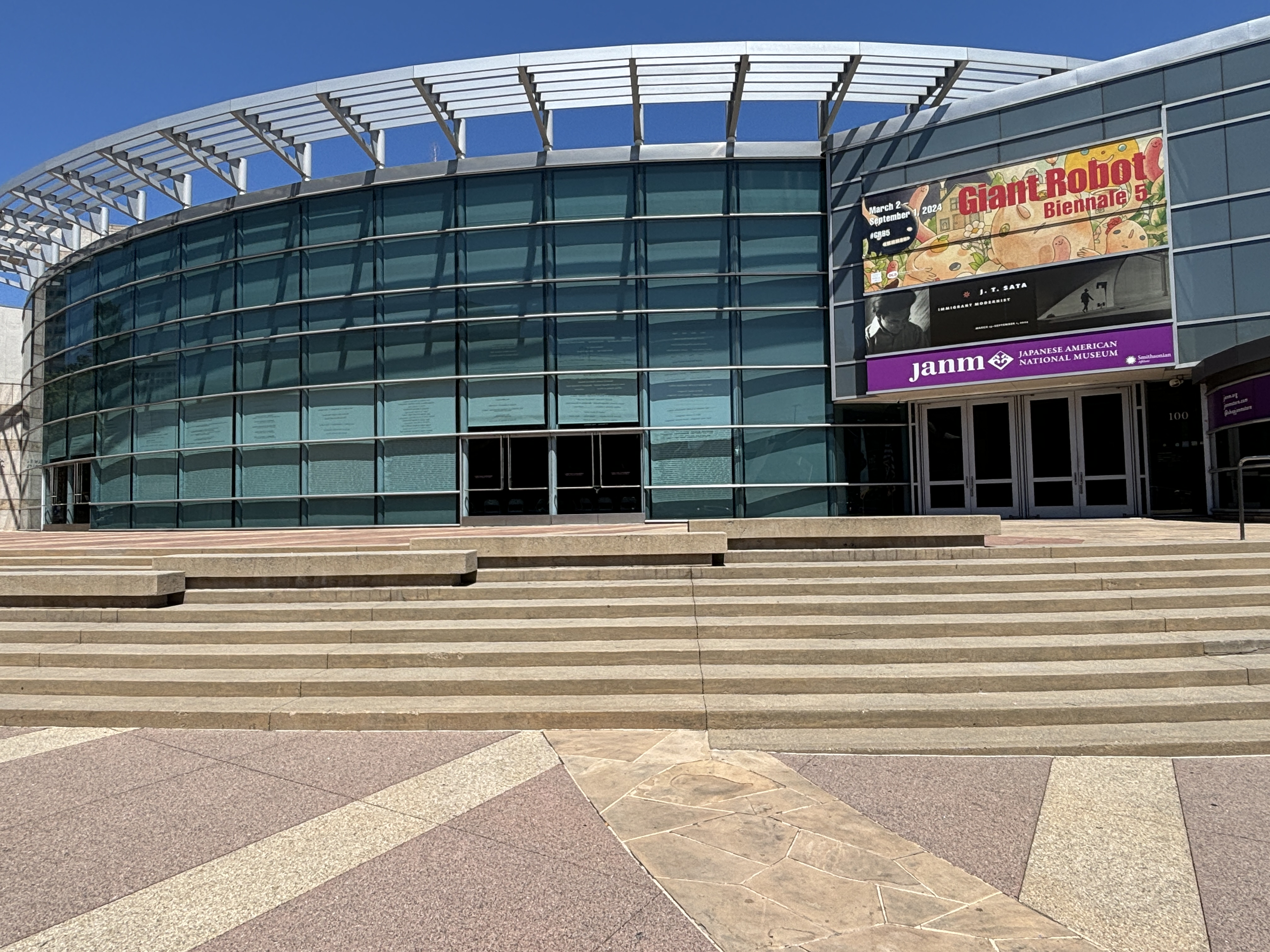
- Museum in August 2024
- Established: 1992
- Location: Little Tokyo, Los Angeles, California
- Type: History and culture of Japanese Americans
- Public transit access: Little Tokyo/Arts District
- Website: www.janm.org

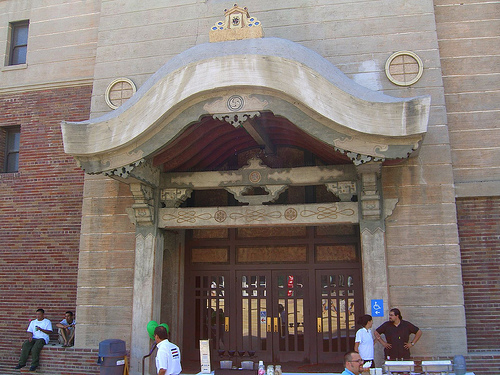
First home of the Japanese American National Museum at First and Central

The Japanese American National Museum (全米日系人博物館, Zenbei Nikkeijin Hakubutsukan) is located in Los Angeles, California, and dedicated to preserving the history and culture of Japanese Americans. Founded in 1992, it is located in the Little Tokyo area near downtown. The museum is an affiliate within the Smithsonian Affiliations program.

The museum covers more than 130 years of Japanese-American history, dating to the first Issei generation of immigrants. Its moving image archive contains over 100,000 feet (30,000 m) of 16 mm and 8 mm home movies made by and about Japanese Americans from the 1920s to the 1950s. It also contains artifacts, textiles, art, photographs, and oral histories of Japanese Americans. The Japanese American National Museum of Los Angeles and the Academy Film Archive collaborate to care for and provide access to home movies that document the Japanese-American experience. Established in 1992, the JANM Collection at the Academy Film Archive currently contains over 250 home movies and continues to grow.

== History ==
Bruce Teruo Kaji (1926–2017) served as the founding president of the museum.He worked together with other prominent Japanese Americans to establish the institution. At the time, the community had become increasingly organized around seeking recognition of the injustices inflicted on them by the federal government during World War II.

The museum was established as a means of preserving the positive elements of the community’s history and culture in the United States. When it first opened in 1992, it was located in the historic 1925 Hompa Hongwanji Buddhist Temple. Irene Hirano served as its first executive director and later as president and CEO of the museum. In January 1999, the National Museum opened its current 85,000-square-foot (7,900 m^{2}) Pavilion, designed under the supervision of architect Gyo Obata, to the public. The temple building was used by government officials in 1942 to process Japanese Americans for wartime confinement. It is now used for offices and storage.

In 1993 the museum was given hundreds of artifacts and letters from children in internment camps, which they had sent to San Diego librarian Clara Breed. The material was featured in an exhibit, "Dear Miss Breed": Letters from Camp. It is now part of the museum's permanent collection.

In 1997, the Frank H. Watase Media Arts Center was established by Robert A. Nakamura and Karen L. Ishizuka, to develop new ways to document, preserve and make known the experience of Americans of Japanese ancestry. In 1999, the Manabi and Sumi Hirasaki National Resource Center (HNRC) was established to provide access to the museum's information and resources, both at the facility and online. It documents the life and culture of the Japanese Americans.

Akemi Kikumura Yano, author, was the museum's first curator. She succeeded Irene Hirano as president and CEO from 2008 until 2011. During her tenure, in December 2010, the museum was awarded the National Medal for Museum and Library Service.

Rev. Greg Kimura, an Episcopal priest, was appointed the president and CEO of the museum, serving between 2012 and 2016. During his time the museum experienced an economic downturn as he looked to promote untraditional exhibits and let go core staff members. He resigned in May 2016 to pursue other work opportunities.

In 2016, Ann Burroughs was announced to replace him as the new interim CEO and was officially selected shortly thereafter. Burroughs spoke of her role: "I am committed to reinvigorating and finding new ways to advance the museum's key values, emphasizing the importance of being vigilant about democracy and stressing the value of diversity in our world today."

The museum has refused to comply with Donald Trump's Executive Order 14253, which targets museums' diversity, equity, and inclusion programs, resulting in a federal funding cut of $1.7 million from the Institute of Museum and Library Services and the National Endowment for the Humanities. William T. Fujioka, chair of the museum's board of trustees has responded, "And so now we feel it's even more important to tell our story and to stand up and to support other marginalized communities who are being subjected to this gross injustice, violation of civil rights, due process, and everything that actually occurred to our community in 1942."

== Exhibits ==
The museum has three on-going exhibitions. The Interactive StoryFile of Lawson Iichiro Sakai is an interactive exhibition in which Lawson has answered a thousand questions regarding himself and his legacy. Common Ground: The Heart of Community, covers 130 years of Japanese American history, from the Issei and early immigration into the United States, World War II incarceration, to the present. Lastly, Wakaji Matsumoto—An Artist in Two Worlds: Los Angeles and Hiroshima, 1917–1944 is an online exhibition featuring photographs of the Japanese American community in Los Angeles prior to World War II and of urban life in Hiroshima prior to the 1945 atomic bombing of the city.

=== Selected previous exhibitions ===
- Glenn Kaino: Aki's Market (June 30, 2023 - January 29, 2024)
- Don't fence me in: Coming of Age in America's Concentration Camps (March 4 - October 1, 2023)
- Sutra and Bible: Faith and the Japanese American World War II Incarceration (February 26, 2022 - February 19, 2023)
- BeHere / 1942: A New Lens on the Japanese American Incarceration (May 7, 2022 - January 8, 2023)
- Miné Okubo's Masterpiece: The Art of Citizen 13660 (August 28, 2021 - March 27, 2022)
- A Life In Pieces: The Diary and Letters of Stanley Hayami (July 9, 2021 - January 9, 2022)
- Under a Mushroom Cloud: Hiroshima, Nagasaki, and the Atomic Bomb (November 9, 2019 - July 25, 2021)
- Taiji Terasaki: Transcendients (February 1, 2020 - May 16, 2021)
- At First Light (May 25, 2019 - October 20, 2019)
- Kaiju Vs. Heroes (September 15, 2018 - July 7, 2019)
- Gambatte! (November 17, 2018 - April 28, 2019)
- hapa.me: 15 years of the hapa project (April 7, 2018 - October 28, 2018)
- What We Carried (May 19, 2018 - August 5, 2018)
- Transpacific Borderlands: The Art of the Japanese Diaspora in Lima, Los Angeles, Mexico City, and Saõ Paulo (September 17, 2017 - February 25, 2018)
- New Frontiers: The Many Worlds of George Takei (March 12, 2017 - August 20, 2017)
- Instructions to All Persons: Reflections on Executive Order 9066 (February 18, 2017 - August 13, 2017)
- Tatau: Marks of Polynesia (July 30, 2016 - January 22, 2017)
- Uprooted: Japanese American Farm Labor Camps During World War II (September 27, 2016 - January 8, 2017)
- Above the Fold: New Expressions in Origami (May 29, 2016 - August 21, 2016)
- Making Waves: Japanese American Photography 1920-1940 (February 28, 2016 - June 26, 2016)
- Hello! Exploring the Supercute World of Hello Kitty (October 11, 2014 - May 31, 2015)
- Two Views: Photographs by Ansel Adams and Leonard Frank (February 28, 2016 - April 24, 2016)
- Giant Robot Biennale 4 (October 11, 2015 - January 24, 2016)
- Before They Were Heroes: Sus Ito's World War II Images (July 14, 2015 - September 6, 2015)
- Sugar/ Islands: Finding Okinawa in Hawai'i - The Art of Laura Kina and Emily Hanako Momohara (July 11, 2015 - September 6, 2015)
- Dodgers: Brotherhood of the Game (March 29 - September 14, 2014)
- Perseverance: Japanese Tattoo Tradition in a Modern World (March 8 - September 14, 2014)
- Marvels & Monsters: Unmasking Asian Images in U.S. Comics, 1942-1986 (October 12, 2013 - February 9, 2014)
- Folding Paper: The Infinite Possibilities of Origami (March 10 - August 26, 2012)
- Drawing the Line: Japanese American Art, Design & Activism in Post-War Los Angeles (October 15, 2011 – February 19, 2012)
- Year of the Rabbit: Stan Sakai's Usagi Yojimbo (July 9 - October 30, 2011)
- No Victory Ever Stays Won: The ACLU's 90 Years of Protecting Liberty (November 21 - December 11, 2010)
- Mixed: Portraits of Multiracial Kids by Kip Fulbeck (March 20 - October 17, 2010)
- 20 Years Ago Today: Supporting Visual Artists in L.A. (October 4, 2008 - January 11, 2009)
- Glorious Excess (Born): Paintings by Linkin Park's Mike Shinoda (July 12 - August 3, 2008)
- Living Flowers: Ikebana and Contemporary Art (June 15 - September 7, 2008)
- Southern California Gardeners' Federation: Fifty Years (October 25 - November 13, 2005)
- Boyle Heights: The Power of Place (September 8, 2002 – February 23, 2003)
- Sumo U.S.A.: Wrestling the Grand Tradition (July 3 - November 30, 1997)
- Dear Miss Breed: Letters from Camp (January 14 - April 13, 1997)

== Major projects ==
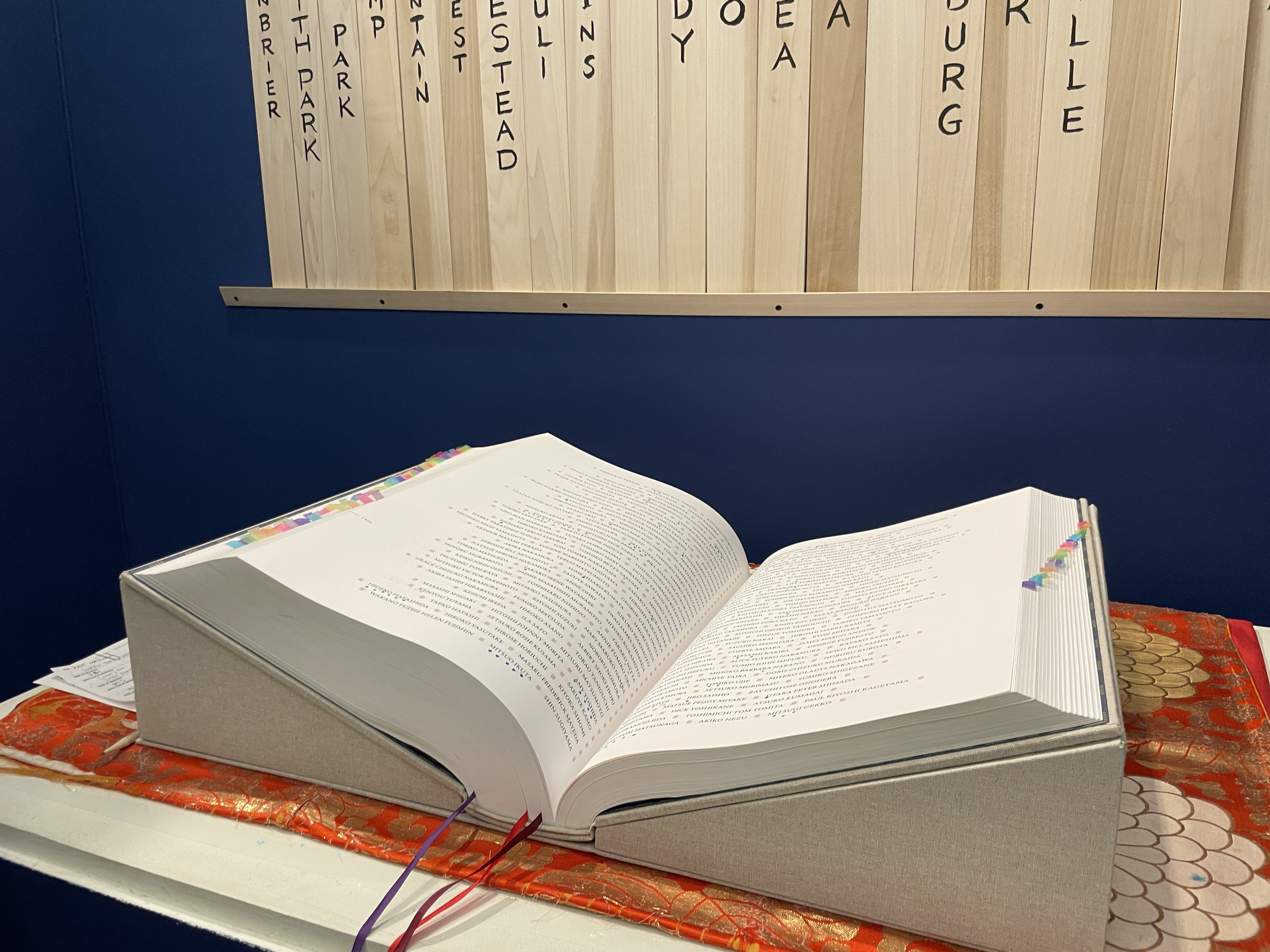
The Ireichō contains the names of the 125,000+ Nikkei incarcerated by the U.S. during World War II.

Completed in 2022, the Ireichō is the first comprehensive listing of the over 125,000 persons of Japanese ancestry who were incarcerated by the U.S. government during World War II. A physical book was printed and displayed at the museum for internees and their friends and family to acknowledge, honor, and if necessary, correct the record within the database. Discover Nikkei, a multilingual, online resource that presents the global Nikkei experience through first-person narratives, historic photos and research, and opportunities for user engagement. The museum's International Nikkei Research Project produced the book New Worlds, New Lives (2002).

== Additional images ==
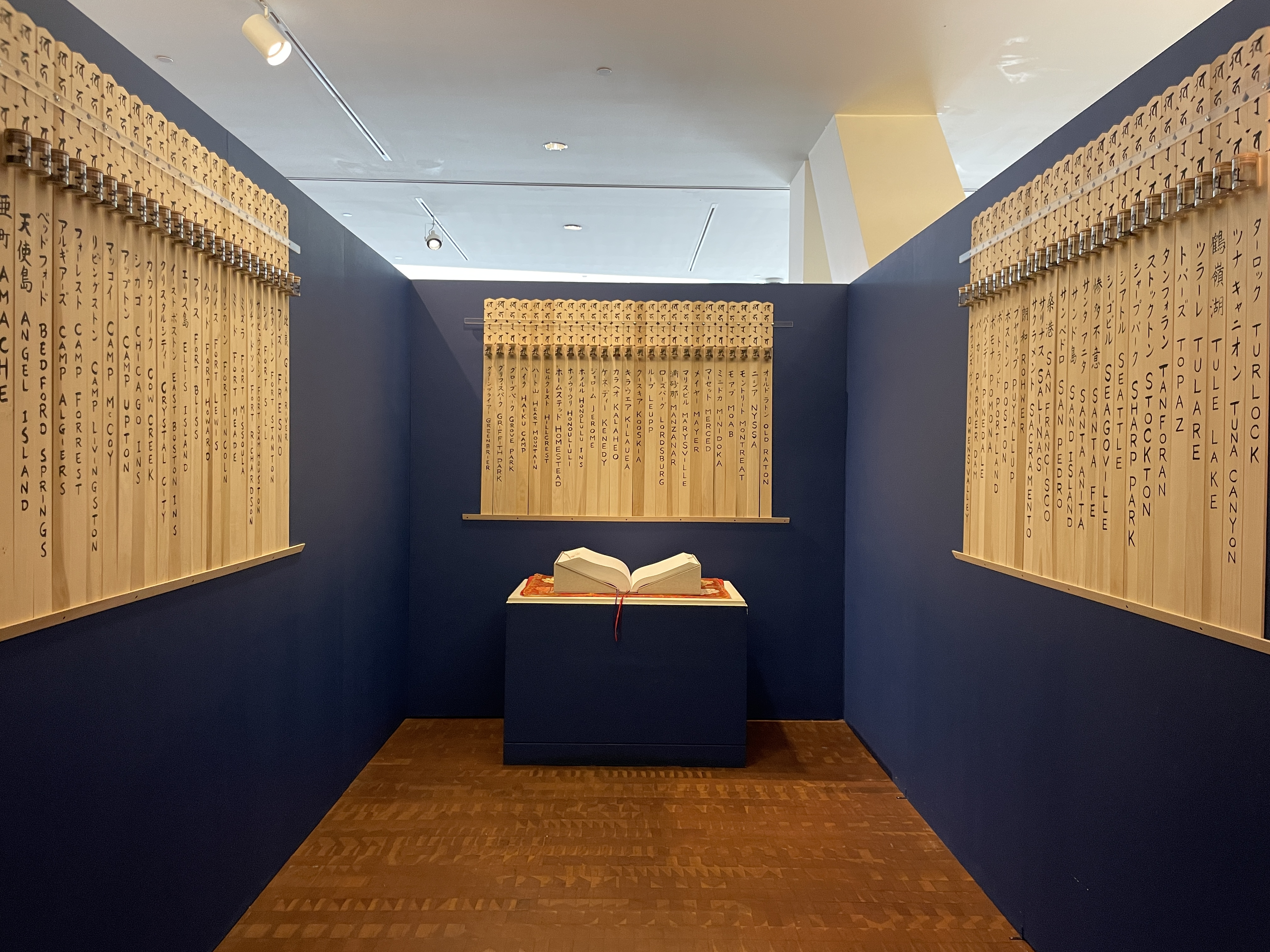
The Ireicho exhibit at the museum

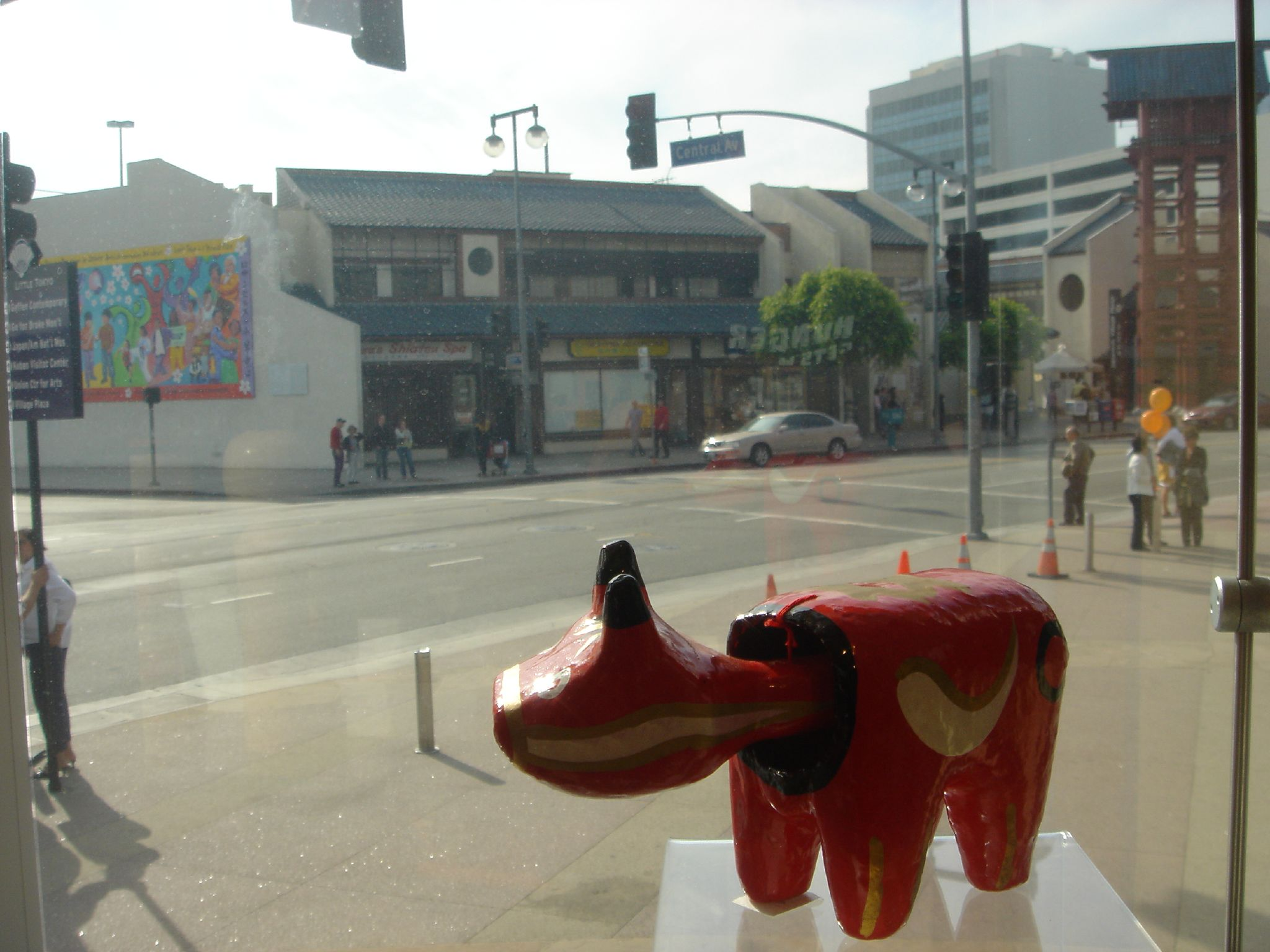
Akabeko at the shop inside the museum

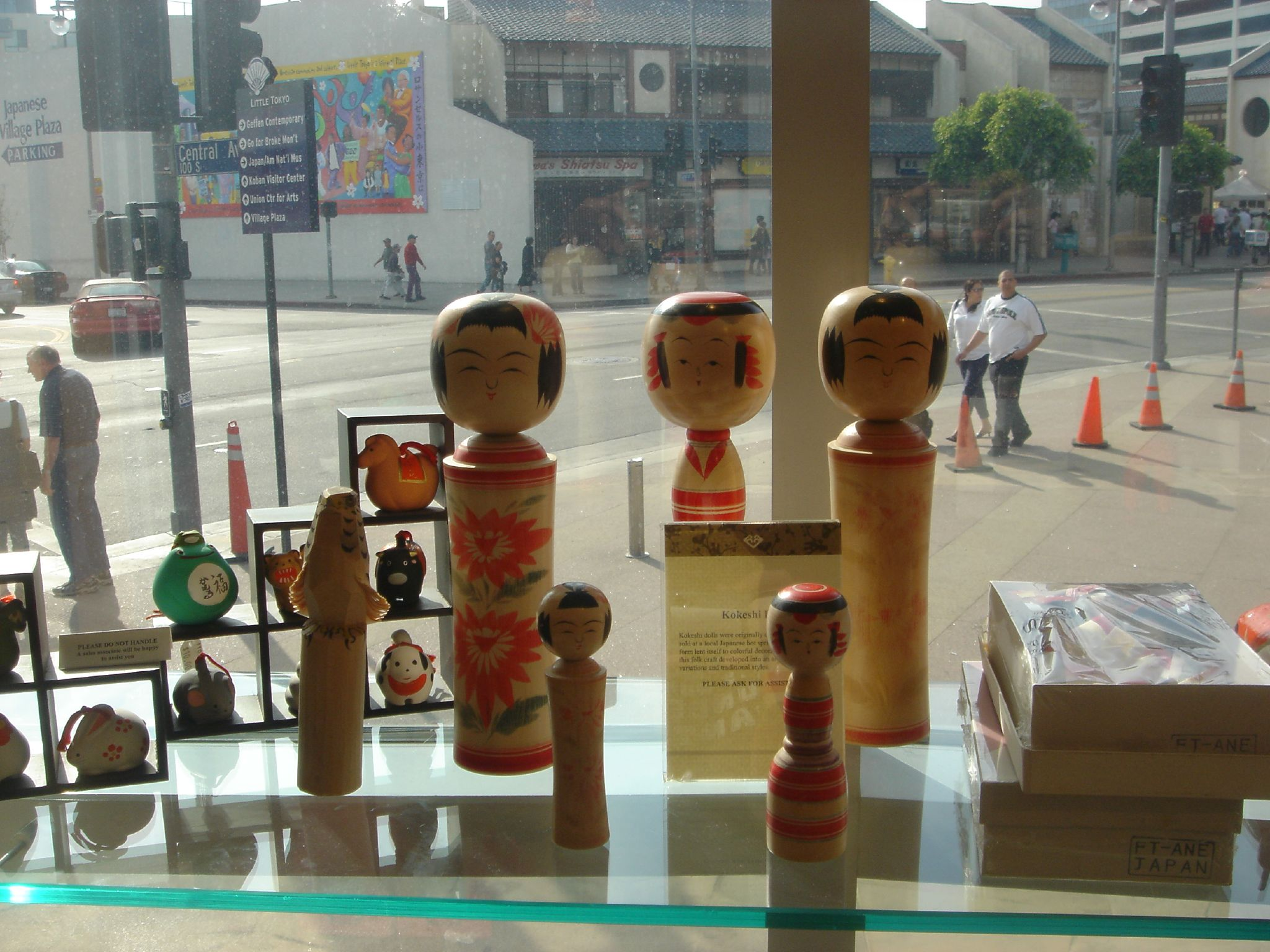
Kokeshi at the shop inside the museum

== Management ==
Ann Burroughs serves as the President and Chief Executive Officer of the museum.

The museum's board of trustees includes former Los Angeles County Chief Executive Officer William T. Fujioka and actor George Takei. George Takei represented the museum as his charity during his time on The Celebrity Apprentice and during his appearance on The Newlywed Game.

== See also ==
- Go for Broke Monument - adjacent
- History of the Japanese in Los Angeles
- Wintersburg Village, California
- Japanese American Citizens League
- Japanese American National Library
- Japanese American Museum of San Jose
- Japanese Cultural Center of Hawaii
- Densho: The Japanese American Legacy Project
- Japanese American Committee for Democracy
- U.S.-Japan Council
