= Karen L. Ishizuka =

American writer, curator and documentary producer

- Education: Ph.D. in Anthropology from the University of California, Los Angeles in 2015
- Alma mater: San Diego State University University of California, Los Angeles
- Known for: Independent writer, media producer, and chief curator of the Japanese American National Museum.

Karen L. Ishizuka is an independent writer, chief curator of the Japanese American National Museum and a documentary producer. She is a third-generation (sansei) Japanese American who, along with her family were incarcerated in the Manzanar and Jerome concentration camps during World War II.

== Education and career ==
Ishizuka earned a Master of Social Work degree from San Diego State University. She began her Ph.D. in the late 1970s but left to do on-the-ground community work focused on Asian American history, culture and community. Over three decades later, Ishizuka went back to school, earning her Ph.D. in Anthropology from the University of California, Los Angeles in 2015.

She is the author of Serve the People: Making Asian America in the Long Sixties and Lost and Found: Reclaiming the Japanese American Incarceration. Ishizuka was also the coeditor, alongside Patricia R. Zimmermann, of Mining the Home Movie: Excavations in Histories and Memories.

Ishizuka has served as a media producer, curator, and director of the Frank H. Watase Media Arts Center at the Japanese American National Museum (JANM). She created the Photographic and Moving Image Archive at the Museum. In 2016, Ishizuka and Robert A. Nakamura, her filmmaking partner and husband, received the inaugural JANM Legacy Award. In 2018, Ishizuka was appointed to the position of Chief Curator.

As an advocate for home movies as an important form of documentation for people of color often overlooked by mass media, Ishizuka has produced film installations that feature home movies including Through Our Own Eyes (1992), a three-screen video installation featuring home movies taken by early Issei in America in the 1920s and 1930s, and Something Strong Within (1994), which contained home movies taken by inmates in the World War II camps.

== Works ==
- Serve the People: Making Asian America in the Long Sixties. Verso. 2017. ISBN 9781781689981. OCLC 1026859766. In his Library Journal review, Joshua Wallace wrote "This fascinating study is highly recommended for those interested in Asian American history and the civil rights movement".
- Ishizuka, Karen; Zimmerman, Patricia R., eds. (2007). Mining the Home Movie: Excavations in Histories and Memories. University of California Press. ISBN 9780520248076. OCLC 869893729. Reviewed in Journal of Family Social Work.
- Lost and Found: Reclaiming the Japanese American Incarceration. University of Illinois Press. 2006. ISBN 9780252073724. OCLC 73957938.
- Karen L. Ishizuka (producer), Robert A. Nakamura (director) (2001). Toyo Miyatake : Infinite Shades of Gray (motion picture). Los Angeles: Japanese American National Museum. OCLC 775460069. Kevin Thomas characterized this film in the Los Angeles Times as "Karen Ishizuka's eloquent, deeply moving Toyo Miyatake: Infinite Shades of Gray".
