= Finger Lakes Environmental Film Festival =

Annual arts festival in Ithaca, New York

Finger Lakes Environmental Film Festival (FLEFF) is an annual multi-arts, interdisciplinary, cross media festival in Ithaca, New York, dedicated to showcasing global media projects focusing on issues pertaining to sustainability.

== History ==
The Finger Lakes Environmental Film Festival was launched in 1997 as an outreach project from the Center for the Environment at Cornell University, Ithaca, New York. Always dedicated to films with a message, the festival, under program director Christopher Riley, expanded to become a major regional event in upstate New York.

In 2004, Ithaca College was the major sponsor and host of the festival. In 2005 the festival moved permanently to Ithaca College, where it is housed in the Division of Interdisciplinary and International Studies as a program to link intellectual inquiry and debate to larger global issues.

== Programming ==
In recent years, FLEFF moved toward incorporating new media as yet another platform to interrogate sustainability across all of its forms: economic, social, ecological, political, cultural, technological, and aesthetic. The festival is in the spirit of UNESCO’s initiative on sustainable development. This initiative has redefined and expanded environmental issues to explore the international interconnections between war, air, disease, the land, health, water, genocide, food, education, technology, cultural heritage, and diversity. Through film, video, new media, installation, performance, panels, and presentations, the festival engages vigorous debate across media and disciplines. It hosts a large number of national and transnational artists every year for a week and it showcases Ithaca College as a regional and national center for thinking differently —in new ways, interfaces, and forms— about the environment and sustainability.

As of March 2012, FLEFF was co-directed by professor of cinema, photography, and media arts Patricia R. Zimmermann and professor of politics Thomas Shevory at Ithaca College.
