= NCRR =

NCRR can refer to:

- North Carolina Railroad, a railroad in North Carolina
- Nevada Central Railroad, a former railroad in Nevada from 1880 to 1938
- National Center for Research Resources, a former center in the NIH from 1990 to 2011
- Nikkei for Civil Rights and Redress, which produced the 2004 educational short film Stand Up for Justice
