= Alexis Cruz =

American actor (born 1974)

- Born: September 29, 1974 (age 51); The Bronx, New York, U.S.
- Occupation: Actor
- Years active: 1985–present
- Height: 5 ft 9 in (175 cm)

Alexis Cruz (born September 29, 1974) is an American actor, known for his performances as Rafael in Touched by an Angel and as Skaara in Stargate and Stargate SG-1.

== Biography ==
Cruz was born in The Bronx of Puerto Rican descent. His mother, Julia, was a songwriter. He currently resides in Los Angeles. He started his acting career when he was 9. However, when he was 13, and was auditioning for a role, the director explained to him that he was a bad actor, so Cruz decided to enter The School of Performing Arts that same year.

Cruz appeared as assistant D.A. Martin Allende in the legal drama Shark, with co-stars James Woods and Jeri Ryan. In the 1998 film Why Do Fools Fall in Love, Cruz played the role of Herman Santiago, one of the original members of the rock and roll group The Teenagers. Along with Erick Avari, Richard Kind, and French Stewart, he is one of only four actors to appear in both the original Stargate film and the continuing TV series Stargate SG-1, Stargate Atlantis, and Stargate Universe.

== Filmography ==
=== Film ===
Year	Film	Role	Notes
1987	The Pick-up Artist	Charlie	
1989	Rooftops	Squeak	
1990	Gryphon	Ricky	
1990	Old man and the Sea	Manolo	
1994	Stargate	Skaara	
1997	The Brave	Weyman	
1998	Why Do Fools Fall in Love	Herman Santiago	
1999	Learning to Swim	Guillermo	Short film
2000	That Summer in LA	Smiley	
2002	Bug	Sung	
2003	DarkWolf	Miguel	Video
2004	Spectres	Sean	
2004	Stand Up for Justice: The Ralph Lazo Story	Ralph Lazo	Short film
2007	Tortilla Heaven	Marco	
2009	Drag Me to Hell	Farm Worker	
2014	Altergeist	Mike	
2023	Spic	Álvaro	Short film

=== Television ===
Year	Television Show	Role	Notes
1985	The Cosby Show	Enrique Terron	1 episode
1990	The Old Man and the Sea	Manolo	Miniseries
1991	Sesame Street	Alex	1 episode
1995	Streets of Laredo	Joey Garza	Miniseries
1995	The Price of Love	Alberto	TV movie
1995	ER	Terry	1 episode
1996	Grand Avenue	Raymond	TV movie
1997	Riot	Carlos	TV movie
1997	Detention: The Siege at Johnson High	Frankie Rodriguez	TV movie
1997–2003	Stargate SG-1	Skaara/Klorel	6 episodes
1997–2003	Touched by an Angel	Rafael	16 episodes
2001	Almost a Woman	Nestor	TV movie
2004	CSI: Crime Scene Investigation	Phillip Riley	1 episode
2006	Slayer	Alex	TV movie
2006–2007	Shark	Martin Allende	11 episodes
2012	Eagleheart	Scatman's little brother	1 episode
2013	Castle	Lyle Gomez	1 episode
2020	Love Life		1 episode
2021	FBI	Hector Contreras	1 episode
2022	Law & Order: Special Victims Unit	Father Daniel	1 episode

=== Videogames ===
Year	Game	Role	Notes
2011	L.A. Noire	Patrolman Enrique Gonzales	
2018	Red Dead Redemption 2	Additional Motion Capture	

== See also ==
- List of Puerto Ricans
