= Yuki Okinaga Llewellyn =

American internment survivor

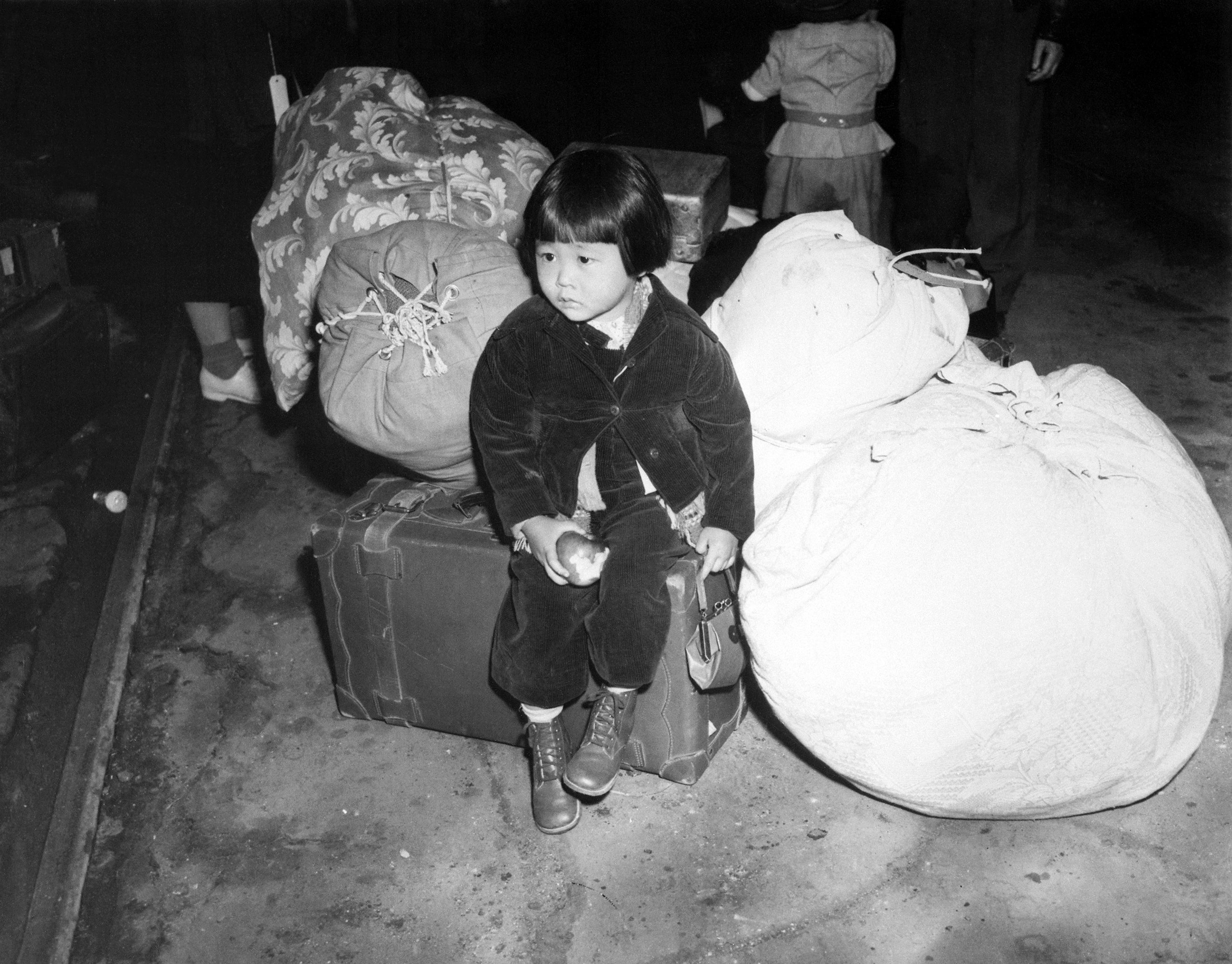
- Yuki Okinaga Hayakawa, photographed in 1942 by Clem Albers at Union Station
- Born: Yukiko Helen Okinaga Hayakawa; April 22, 1939; Los Angeles, California, U.S.
- Died: March 8, 2020 (aged 80); Columbia, Missouri, U.S.
- Education: Lake Forest College (BA); Tulane University (MFA)
- Occupation: Academic administrator

Yuki Helen Okinaga Hayakawa Llewellyn (April 22, 1939 – March 8, 2020) was an American child survivor of the Japanese internment process during World War II. A 1942 photograph of her sitting on her mother's luggage became an iconic image of the era. In adulthood, Llewellyn was assistant dean of students at the University of Illinois, and frequently spoke on her childhood experience of displacement and incarceration.

== Early life and education ==
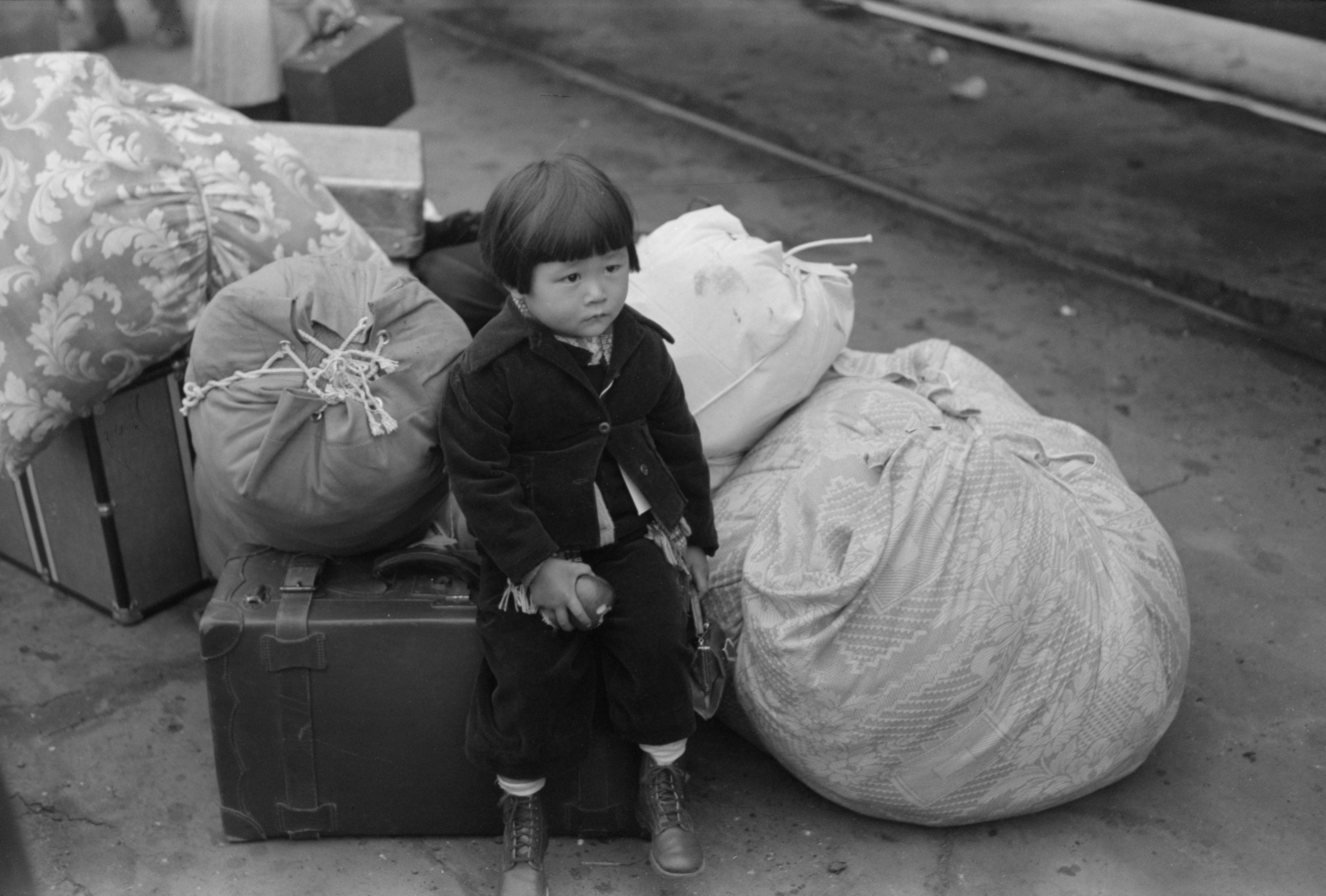
Yuki Okinaga Hayakawa, photographed at Union Station, Los Angeles, by Russell Lee (April 1942)

Yuki Helen Okinaga Hayakawa was born in Los Angeles in 1939, the daughter of Jacob Hideto Okinaga and Mikiko Hayakawa. Her mother was born in Wyoming but raised in Japan. Her parents divorced in 1941. When she was two years old, she and her mother were relocated by the United States government under Executive Order 9066. They were sent to the Manzanar War Relocation Center. A photograph of her as a tiny child, waiting with her mother's bags at Union Station, became famous.

Mikiko Hayakawa and Yuki Okinaga Hayakawa stayed at Manzanar until October 1945. "I was lucky to have been a child — a young child at that — I didn't know what it was like not to be incarcerated," she recalled sixty years later. A sponsor family in Cleveland, Ohio, hosted the mother and child upon their release. Yuki Okinaga Hayakawa earned a scholarship to attend Lake Forest College. She graduated in 1962, with a bachelor's degree in drama. She pursued further studies at Tulane University, where she earned a Master of Fine Arts degree in 1966.

== Career ==
Llewellyn worked at the University of Illinois in Urbana-Champaign for most of her career, beginning as a secretary in the public relations department and rising to the rank of assistant dean of students and director of registered student organizations. She was executive director of the University of Illinois Mothers Association, and compiled a fundraiser cookbook for the organization. She also directed theatrical productions in Urbana.

Llewellyn was still at Illinois in 2005, when the school opened its Asian American Cultural Center, and she was always willing to speak to students about her childhood experiences with displacement and incarceration. Also in 2005, she made her first return visit to Manzanar since 1945, with photographer Paul Kitagaki Jr.

== Personal life ==
Yuki Okinaga Hayakawa married Don Alvin Llewellyn. They had a son David Tatsuo Llewellyn, and later divorced. Yuki Okinaga Llewellyn died in 2020, in Columbia, Missouri, aged 80 years. Her photograph is displayed prominently at the Manzanar National Historic Site, and has appeared on book covers and museum exhibits over the years.
