= Sue Kunitomi Embrey =

American teacher and activist (1923–2006)

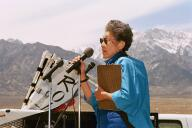
- Embrey welcoming the crowd at the 33rd annual Manzanar Pilgrimage in 2002
- Born: January 6, 1923; Los Angeles, California, U.S.
- Died: May 15, 2006 (aged 83); Los Angeles, California, U.S.
- Education: California State University (BA); University of Southern California (MEd)
- Occupations: Teacher and activist
- Known for: Co-chaired the Manzanar Committee

Sue Kunitomi Embrey (Japanese: 国富 末子, January 6, 1923–May 15, 2006) was an American teacher, activist and long-time chair of the Manzanar Committee, which established the annual Manzanar pilgrimage and obtained National Historic Site status for the former concentration camp.

== Early life and education ==
Born Sueko Kunitomi, the sixth of her Japanese immigrant parents' eight children, Embrey was delivered by a mid-wife at the Kunitomi family's home in the Little Tokyo neighborhood of downtown Los Angeles. She attended the (largely Japanese American) Amelia Street School, and like many other Nisei she would go to Japanese language school each day after her regular classes. At fourteen, her father was killed in a truck accident. The family got by on the debts owed to Mr. Kunitomi, which Embrey's mother would collect from friends and neighbors. This went on until Mrs. Kunitomi took out a loan and opened a small grocery store in 1941. Embrey graduated from Abraham Lincoln High School later that year and postponed going to college to help her mother with the family business. She was working at the store when news of the Japanese attack on Pearl Harbor came over the radio on December 7, 1941.

After President Franklin Roosevelt authorized the eviction of Japanese Americans from the West Coast with Executive Order 9066, Embrey's mother was forced to sell the family store at a loss, and one of her brothers moved to Manzanar early, responding to government calls for volunteers to help construct the camp. Embrey, then nineteen, arrived in Manzanar in early 1942 with her mother and six remaining siblings. She worked first at the camp's camouflage net factory, then took a job as a reporter with the Manzanar Free Press and ultimately became the newspaper's managing editor.

== Career ==
In 1943, she was given clearance to leave camp and moved by herself to Madison, Wisconsin, where she took a job at a mail order company after being denied entrance to the University of Wisconsin, having been told that a Japanese American on campus would endanger a war-related project then taking place at the school. Embrey relocated again in 1944, joining her two older brothers in Chicago.

Embrey returned to Los Angeles in 1948 to care for her mother and briefly worked for the L.A. County Department of Education before transferring to the Health Department. She joined the Democratic Club and the Nisei Progressives, where she met Garland Embrey, whom she married in 1950. Her husband's political activities during the McCarthy era resulted in frequent encounters with the FBI, but he was able to secure a teaching position at West Los Angeles Community College, where he taught for twenty years. With the support of her husband, who took on joint responsibility for caring for the couple's two children, Embrey began attending California State University part-time and graduated with a bachelor's degree in English in 1969. She received her Master's in Education from the University of Southern California in 1972 and soon after began teaching for the Los Angeles Unified School District. She pushed for an inclusion of the history of the Japanese American incarceration in grade school and college classrooms, and became active in various labor organizations like the United Teachers of Los Angeles, the Asian Pacific American Labor Alliance, United Farm Workers, and UCLA's Labor Center. In 1969, Embrey attended the first Manzanar pilgrimage and spoke publicly about her wartime experiences. The following year, she co-founded the Manzanar Committee with Warren Furutani. Eventually she became chair of the Committee, organizing the annual pilgrimage for thirty-six years, leading the campaign to have Manzanar dedicated as a California historic landmark in 1972 and as a National Historic Site in 1992, and working with the National Park Service to develop the interpretive site.

Embrey died May 15, 2006, of kidney failure at a Los Angeles Hospital. She was 83.
