= Louise Suski =

Japanese American newspaper editor (1905–2003)

- Born: June 27, 1905; San Francisco
- Died: June 5, 2003 (aged 97); Cerritos
- Alma mater: Los Angeles High School; University of California, Los Angeles
- Occupation: Editor
- Employer: Rafu Shimpo (1926–)

Louise Suski (June 27, 1905 – June 5, 2003) was the first woman editor-in-chief and English-section editor-in-chief at the Japanese-English language newspaper Rafu Shimpo.

== Early life ==
On June 27, 1905, Suski was born in San Francisco. She had six siblings, including Julia Suski who illustrated for Rafu Shimpo from 1926 to 1929. Her family attended the Maryknoll Catholic Church. In 1924, Suski graduated from Los Angeles High School. After graduating, she applied to the University of California, Los Angeles to pursue a career in education, but she never finished her degree.

== Career ==
In 1926, Suski became the first woman editor-in-chief and English language editor-in-chief at Rafu Shimpo. She worked at Rafu Shimpo until 1942 and was colleagues with Togo Tanaka. Due to the incarceration of Japanese Americans during World War II in the United States, Suski and her family were incarcerated at Heart Mountain Relocation Center. While at Heart Mountain Relocation Center, Suski joined the center's newspaper, Heart Mountain Sentinel.

After the war, Suski moved to Chicago. She would go on to work for General Mailing and Sales Company, the Japanese American Evacuation and Resettlement Study (JERS) office, Scene magazine, and Shikago Shimpo.

== Death ==
Suski retired in 1978 and returned to Cerritos to live with her brother and sister-in-law. She died in 2003.
