= Togo Tanaka =

American newspaper editor

- 田中 董梧
- Tanaka in 1942
- Born: January 7, 1916; Portland, Oregon, U.S.
- Died: May 21, 2009 (aged 93); Los Angeles, California, U.S.
- Education: University of California, Los Angeles

Togo "Walter" Tanaka (Japanese: 田中 董梧, January 7, 1916 – May 21, 2009) was an American newspaper journalist and editor who reported on the difficult conditions in the Manzanar camp, where he was one of 110,000 Japanese Americans who had been relocated after the Japanese attack on Pearl Harbor on December 7, 1941.

== Early life and education ==
Tanaka was born on January 7, 1916, in Portland, Oregon, the fifth of his Issei parents' six children. He grew up in Los Angeles, where his parents operated a vegetable market, and graduated there from Hollywood High School at age 16. He enrolled at the University of California, Los Angeles, where he wrote for the Daily Bruin and a local Japanese-language newspaper, graduating in 1936 with a bachelor's degree in political science.

He was hired by the Japanese American newspaper Rafu Shimpo while he was still in college, where he worked alongside Louise Suski and edited the paper's English language content, writing editorials encouraging Nisei, those born in the United States to Japanese immigrant parents, to be loyal Americans. During this time, he also joined the Japanese American Citizens League, taking a position at the national level in charge of publicity. In an October 1941 trip to Washington, D.C. arranged by the newspaper's publisher, H. T. Komai, Tanaka tried to ensure that the paper would be able to continue publishing in the event that hostilities broke out with Japan, meeting with First Lady Eleanor Roosevelt and Attorney General Francis Biddle. However, his presence was met with suspicion from War Department officials, who interrogated him and challenged his allegiance to his home country.

== Arrest and internment ==
Tanaka was one of the few American-born individuals arrested as enemy aliens on December 8, 1941, the day after the Japanese attack on Pearl Harbor. Most of the 5,500 Japanese American men subject to FBI detention were immigrants from Japan. No explanation was offered for his arrest, and he was held incommunicado for 11 days, forbidden even to contact his pregnant wife, before being released without any charges. In a newspaper interview conducted the day after the Pearl Harbor attacks, Tanaka described how the local Japanese community had "not been in sympathy with Japan's expansion program" and had worked with the FBI and Office of Naval Intelligence for the preceding several years. He stated, "We think the Japanese Government is stupid and has embarked on a campaign it has absolutely no chance of winning."

After his release from jail, Tanaka continued to run the Rafu Shimpo, a difficult task since the Issei staff members remained in FBI custody and over 1,000 households had canceled their subscriptions to avoid any perception of ties to Japan. On February 19, 1942, the same day President Franklin Roosevelt signed Executive Order 9066, Tanaka organized a United Citizens Federation meeting at the Maryknoll Catholic Mission, bringing together 21 Nisei organizations and about 1,500 attendees. As the government and the military began to implement plans for removal, he investigated "voluntary evacuation" alternatives and visited the Pomona and Santa Anita assembly centers (then still under construction), reporting on his findings in the Rafu. He edited the last issue of the Rafu Shimpo published before the forced relocation took place.

Together with his family, Tanaka was sent to Manzanar on April 23, 1942, under the terms of the earlier executive order. Tanaka characterized the facility as an "outdoor jail," and he was one of what would eventually be 10,000 Japanese Americans, mostly U.S. citizens from Los Angeles County. Located in California's arid Owens Valley in the foothills of the Sierra Nevada mountains, these inmates lived in crude barracks that did little to protect them from frequent dust storms and, in the winter, freezing temperatures. Tanaka reported, "I cannot see how it is possible for any human being of normal impulses to be cooped up within limited confines of barbed wires, watchtowers, and all the atmosphere of internment and not be touched by the bitterness and disillusionment all around him."

Soon after arriving in camp, he was hired by anthropologist Robert Redfield (a community analyst for the War Relocation Authority) and served as one of Manzanar's two "documentary historians." Using his background in journalism, Tanaka documented the conditions and experiences in the camp for the WRA and sent reports to be included in a study of the internment policy performed at the University of California, Berkeley. His detailed reports on the factional divisions within the camp and his advocacy for cooperation with camp authorities put him into what his son later described as "a no man's land" in which he had lost his rights as an American and was not trusted by other Japanese internees in the camp.

In rioting that took place on the 1942 anniversary of Pearl Harbor, two protesters were killed. Fred Tayama, a prominent JACL leader who had been accused of colluding with WRA officials in the arrest of popular anti-administration organizer Harry Ueno, was beaten in his barracks apartment two days earlier; Tanaka was the next target of the protesters, who were critical of his support for cooperation with military authorities that operated the camp, and was able to avoid attack by donning a disguise and joining the mob searching for him. He was moved with his family after the incident, along with others labeled as collaborators, or "inu," to another internment facility in Death Valley. During this time he wrote reports on the Manzanar Riot and prewar communities for the Japanese American Evacuation and Resettlement study. He was released in 1943 and moved to Chicago, where he worked with a Quaker group that assisted other former Japanese internees and refugees from Nazi Germany to find employment and housing.

== Post-war experiences ==
After the war, Tanaka worked as head of textbook publications at the American Technical Society in Chicago. He also edited "Scene, The Pictorial Magazine", a Life-type periodical for Japanese Americans which ran from 1949 to 1954, and wrote a column for the JACL's national paper, the Pacific Citizen. He moved back to California in 1955 and went into the business of creating trade journals. He started a real estate venture, Gramercy Enterprises, in 1963, and retired from the company in 1985 as chairman.

In a 2005 visit to the exhibit at the Manzanar National Historic Site, he saw his own desk and typewriter on permanent display (where they remain today). A park ranger who had prepared the display described the visit by Tanaka as being "like history walking in the front door."

== Personal life ==
Tanaka died at age 93 on May 21, 2009, at the Ronald Reagan UCLA Medical Center in Los Angeles. He was survived by his wife, to whom he had been married for 68 years, as well as three children, five grandchildren and eight great-grandchildren.
