= John Tateishi =

Japanese American author, historian

- Born: 1939 (age 86–87); Los Angeles, California
- Employer: Japanese American Citizens League
- Movement: Reparations for Japanese-Americans

John Tateishi (born 1939) is the former redress director of the Japanese American Citizens League and was a key figure in the campaign for reparations for the Internment of Japanese Americans. He wrote Redress: the Inside Story of the Successful Campaign for Japanese American Reparations.

== Life ==
Tateishi was born on August 21, 1939 in Lawndale in Los Angeles, California. Tateishi was two at the time of the Pearl Harbor attack, and the federal government forced his family to move to the Manzanar detention center for the duration of the war as part of the enforcement of Executive Order 9066. Tateishi was pivotal in the redress campaign that began in 1978.

At University of California, Berkeley he studied English literature followed by a graduate program at University of California, Davis. He taught at the City College of San Francisco and became involved with the Japanese American Citizens League (JACL) in 1975.

In 1978, he became the chair of the National Committee for Redress and helped guide the campaign. He resigned from the city college in 1981 to fully focus on the campaign, and served as the campaign's principal lobbyist. Tateishi left the campaign two years before the Civil Liberties Act of 1988.

He rejoined the organization as national executive director in 1999, and focused on criticizing the Bush administration's handling of the post 9/11 crisis.

== Books ==
- And Justice for All: An Oral History of the Japanese American Detention Camps – March 1, 1999
- Redress: The Inside Story of the Successful Campaign for Japanese American Reparations – March 10, 2020
