= Minoru Wada =

Japanese prisoner of war

Minoru Wada (Japanese: 和田 実) was a kibei, an American citizen who was educated in Japan, who served as an Imperial Japanese Army junior officer and was taken prisoner on Mindanao by members of the US Army in 1945. He provided Marine bomber crews with vital intelligence and led the aircraft in a highly-successful attack on the headquarters of the Japanese 100th Division. He was motivated by a desire to minimize the loss of life through aiding to effect a swift end to the Pacific War.

== Events ==
Minoru Wada was born in the United States, but was a student in Japan when war erupted with the USA. He was a Second Lieutenant in the Imperial Japanese Army transport section, at the time of his capture. After being taken prisoner in the Philippines, Lt. Wada expressed his strong reservations about the Japanese decision to embark upon a course of war, and further stated a willingness to go to any length, including the sacrifice of his own life, in order to help bring an end to the war, and thus reduce the suffering of the Japanese people. It was suggested that Lt. Wada could bring a rapid end to hostilities on Mindanao by providing information as to the whereabouts of the headquarters of the Imperial Japanese 100th Division. While initially horrified by the idea of assisting in the killing of his fellow Japanese, he concluded that such an action would actually save lives on both sides, and volunteered to personally direct the bomber squadron from the lead plane. Wada didn't speak English, despite being born in America. The mission was undertaken on August 10, 1945.

== Aftermath ==
The attack on the 100th Division headquarters was enormously successful, and succeeded in largely ending combat in Mindanao, as without a functioning command-and-control apparatus, Japanese troops on the island were effectively reduced to the status of disorganized stragglers. Subsequently, Minoru Wada was given a new identity, and his whereabouts today are unknown.
