= Stand Up for Justice: The Ralph Lazo Story =

- Directed by: John Esaki
- Written by: John Esaki
- Produced by: Amy E. Kato
- Starring: Alexis Cruz; Chad Sakamoto; Brittany Ishibashi; Marcus Toji
- Cinematography: Dean Hayasaka
- Edited by: Gail Yasunaga
- Music by: Dave Iwataki; Quetzal
- Production company: Visual Communications (VC)
- Release date: 2004
- Running time: 33 minutes
- Country: United States
- Language: English

Stand Up For Justice: The Ralph Lazo Story (2004) is an educational narrative short film, co-produced by Nikkei for Civil Rights and Redress (NCRR) and Visual Communications (VC).

== Background ==
When 120,000 Japanese Americans were forcibly evacuated from the West Coast of the United States during World War II, Ralph Lazo, a 16-year-old of Mexican American and Irish American descent from Downtown Los Angeles followed his Japanese American friends, neighbors and classmates in to the Manzanar Japanese American internment camp. He remained in the U.S. internment camp until 1944, when he was drafted in to the army, and served in the Pacific theater. Not many beyond the Japanese American community knew of his story, inspiring Nikkei for Civil Rights and Redress (NCRR) to partner with Visual Communications to create an educational film to teach his cross-cultural story in the classroom. Funded by grants from the California Civil Liberties Public Education Program, the half-hour drama was shot at the Manzanar National Historic Site, and in Los Angeles, and completed in 2004.

== Plot ==
In 1941, Ralph Lazo is a 16-year-old student at Belmont High School, an ethnically mixed school in downtown Los Angeles. When Pearl Harbor is bombed, Ralph's Japanese American friend, Jimmy Matsuoka, and his family are forced to sell their belongings and evacuate to a remote concentration camp. Ralph surprises his friends at the train station as they are about to depart for Manzanar, a relocation center in central California. He joins them for the 5-hour train ride, the three-year stay, and a lifelong friendship.

== Cast ==
- Alexis Cruz as Ralph Lazo
- Chad Sakamoto as Jimmy
- Brittany Ishibashi as Ruby
- Marcus Toji as Art
- Greg Hashimoto as Harry
- Emily Kuroda as Mrs. Matsuoka
- Tim Toyama as Mr. Matsuoka
- Ciro Suarez as Ralph's Father
- Sarah Rincon as Ralph's Sister
- Ron Martinez as Senior Ralph
- Takayo Fischer as Senior Ruby
