= Chiye Mori =

Japanese-American poet and journalist

- Born: February 1, 1915; Oregon
- Died: May 20, 2001 (aged 86); Honolulu
- Other names: Loretta Chiye Mori
- Occupations: poet and journalist

Chiye Mori (February 1, 1915 – May 20, 2001) was a Japanese-American poet and journalist who was influential in the Nisei literary community in Los Angeles in the 1930s. While incarcerated at Manzanar, Mori was the first female editor of the Manzanar Free Press newspaper.

== Biography ==
Mori was born on February 1, 1915, to Sakiyo and Yoritaro Mori in Gresham, Oregon. In her youth, her family moved to Long Beach, California, where Mori attended Long Beach Polytechnic High School. As a teenager, Mori won awards for her poetry, sometimes writing under the byline Loretta C. Mori. Mori published essays and poetry in Kashū Mainichi, a daily newspaper published in Los Angeles.

In 1942, following the issuing of Executive Order 9066, Mori was forcibly removed from her home and sent to the Manzanar concentration camp with her mother and stepfather. There she put her writing and editorial skills towards editing early issues of the Manzanar Free Press newspaper. Mori was released in early 1943, and moved to Chicago and then New York City, where she met and married Harry T. Oshima. In New York, Mori edited The Nisei Weekender, a community paper for Nisei living in New York. Mori and her husband were active in the Nisei Progressives, a political organization that advocated for immigration reform, the elimination of discrimination, and reparations for Japanese Americans impacted by Executive Order 9066.

Mori died on May 20, 2001, in Honolulu, Hawaii.
