= Kibei =

Term for Japanese Americans

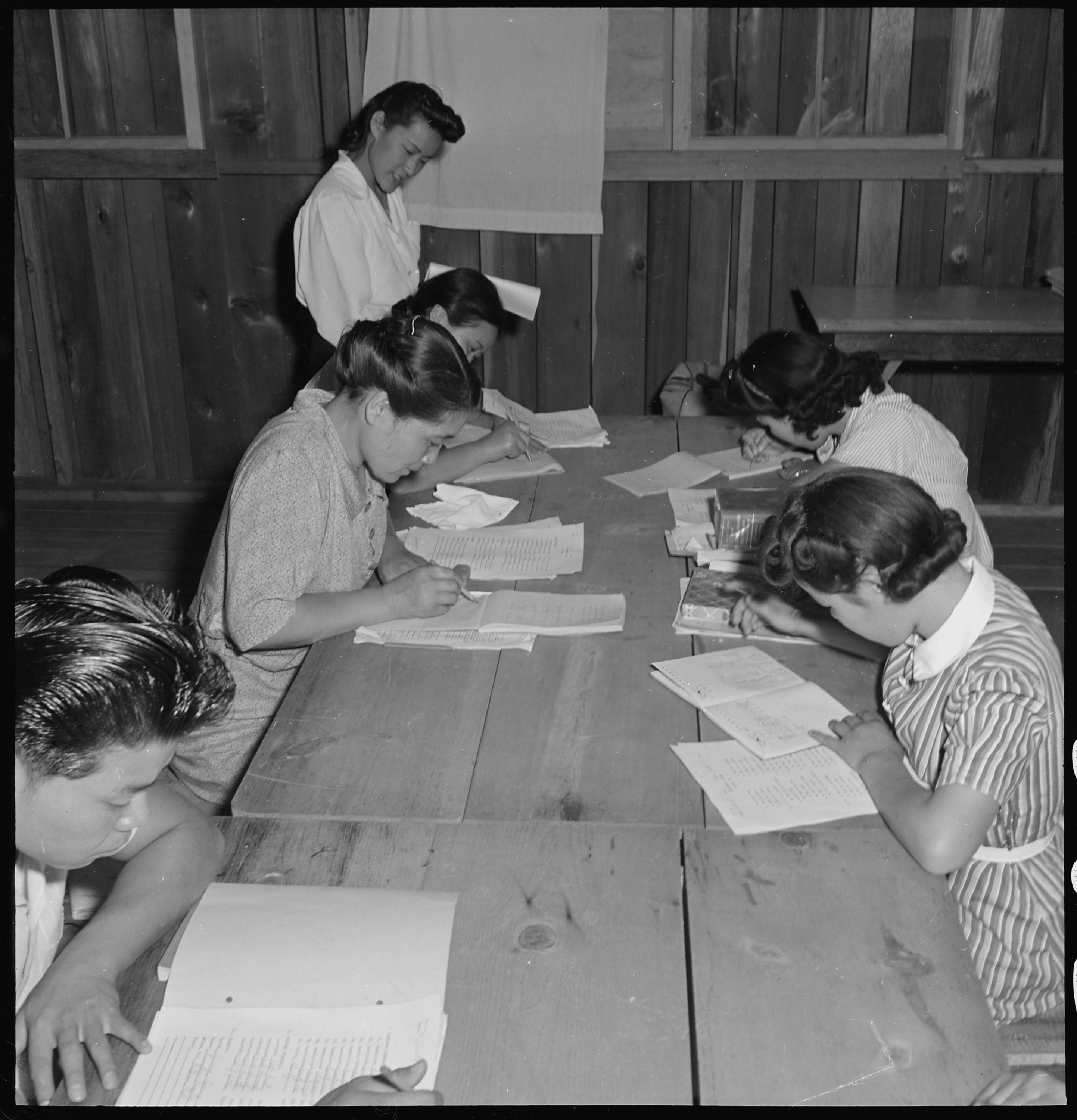
1942. Manzanar Relocation Center, Manzanar, California. Part of a class under the Adult Education Program at this War Relocation Authority center. It is composed of Issei and Kibei evacuees who are studying the Ideals of American Citizenship and the English language with which they are unfamiliar.

Kibei (kibei (帰米; literally "go home to America")) refers to Japanese Americans born in the United States whose parents had sent them to receive their education in Japan and who had then returned to the US by the time that the US and Japan became engaged in war in the 1940s.

== Background ==
The term kibei was often used in the 1940s to describe Japanese Americans born in the United States whose parents had sent them to receive their education in Japan and who had then returned to the United States. Many kibei had dual citizenship. They were sent to Japan to maintain proficiency in Japanese language and cultural traditions, which was particularly important to their parents because there was strong anti-Japanese sentiment in the United States after war with Japan broke out, and they worried that they and their families might be deported back to Japan. The exact number of kibei is not known—perhaps about 11,000. It is said there were about 10,000 Kibei among Nisei (second-generation) Japanese Americans.

When war between the US and Japan broke out in 1941, most Japanese Americans living on the west coast of the United States were interned, while many others volunteered for service in the U.S. military, often as translators.

In contrast, most Japanese Americans who were in school in Japan in late 1941 entered the Japanese army. A notable case was Minoru Wada, an American citizen educated in Japan who served as an Imperial Japanese Army junior officer. After the U.S. took him prisoner in the Philippines in 1945, he provided U.S. bomber crews with vital intelligence and led the aircraft in a highly successful attack on the headquarters of the Japanese 100th Division. He later explained that he had been motivated by a desire to minimize the loss of life by helping to effect a swift end to the Pacific War.

== Sources ==
- "Impossible Subjects". Mae Ngai. Part III (p. 173). Princeton University Press. 2004. Princeton, New Jersey.
- Dictionary.com, http://dictionary.reference.com/browse/kibei. Retrieved 11-30-09.
