= Harry Ueno =

Japanese American activist

Harry Yoshio Ueno
- Born: April 14, 1907. Hawaii, U.S.
- Died: December 14, 2004 (aged 97); Mountain View, California, U.S.
- Occupation: Farmer; Activist
- Known for: Starting the Manzanar Riot

Harry Yoshio Ueno (Japanese: 上野 義雄, 1907-2004) was a Japanese-American union leader who was interned in Manzanar Concentration Camp. He rose to prominence when he was arrested and removed from the camp after being accused of attacking the leader of the Japanese American Citizens League on the night of December 5, 1942. His arrest sparked a series of protests among his fellow detainees in the camp which turned into the Manzanar Riot.

== Early life ==
Harry Ueno was born on April 14, 1907, in Pau’ulino, Hawaii and had an older and younger brother. In 1915 Ueno went to live in Japan where he continued his education outside Hiroshima and Tokyo. He returned to the U.S. in 1923, working various jobs in the Midwest and Pacific Coast. In 1930 he married Japanese immigrant Yaso Taguchi Ueno and raised three sons near Los Angeles' Little Tokyo while doing work in the wholesale produce market. This continued until Japanese American incarceration began after the Pearl Harbor attack in 1941 and signing of Executive Order 9066. Harry Ueno was sent to Manzanar War Relocation Center.

== Internment and Manzanar Riot ==
Ueno arrived at Manzanar on May 15, 1942. While there he worked as a cooks assistant at his mess hall in Block 22. He also developed a rock pond outside the mess hall to help uplift the residents while they waited for meals. In October 1942 he formed the Mess Hall Workers Union which included many Kibei kitchen workers. It was at this time that many of the Issei and Kibei inhabitants were starting to become frustrated with the Japanese American Citizens League (JACL) for supporting their detention in the camp.

On December 5, 1942, a leader of the JACL, Fred Tayama was attacked and seriously injured by a group of six unidentified assailants in the middle of the night. Ueno and two other Kibei were arrested shortly after the attack. Two were released shortly after questioning but Ueno was still held as Tayama specifically identified him as one of his attackers. He was jailed in nearby Independence, California. News of his arrest spread throughout the camp and angered many residents who believed him to be innocent.

On December 6 a few members from the Mess Hall Union went to General Ralph Merritt to negotiate for Ueno’s reinstatement. Merritt requested military police outside the camp’s access gate before meeting with the committee. He agreed to move Ueno to Manzanar’s jail if demands were fulfilled within an hour after the crowd had returned to their barracks. From 7:00 to 9:30 pm the administration negotiated with the inmate representatives, but when the crowd hurled missiles, the MP captain ordered his men to tear gas the crowd. For unknown reasons shots were fired by several soldiers at the demonstrators, leaving 2 dead and 9 wounded.

Despite not being charged or given a hearing, Ueno was removed from Manzanar and sent to a jail in the town of Bishop, California. A few days later he was transferred to the jail of Lone Pine with other men who were deemed to be troublemakers. While there he later recalled that the guards would sometimes shoot at the cell doors with their rifles in the middle of the night when they got extremely drunk.

On January 9, 1943, Ueno and his fellow prisoners were transported to a camp in Moab, Utah, where he spent four months there in a temporary isolation center that was just outside of the camp premises which had been established by the WRA for dissidents of all camps. It is here that he renounced his citizenship and planned on returning to Japan. He was later moved to a camp in the town of Leupp, Arizona, although he was jailed for two weeks before he received a spot in the barracks. Despite repeatedly receiving promises from the WRA, Ueno’s demands for a trial or hearing to determine his guilt or innocence in the attack were never fulfilled. When the camp in Leupp was closed in December 1943 Ueno was transferred to Camp Tulelake where he was finally reunited with his wife and children. Ueno then promised the center’s director Ray Best that he would stay away from all camp politics. It was at Tule Lake that Ueno’s citizenship was restored. He decided to stay in America after learning about the condition of post-war Japan. He was finally released from Camp Tulelake in early 1946.

== Later life ==
Following his release from Camp Tulelake Ueno and his family moved to Santa Clara County where they grew cherries and strawberries on leased land for over twenty years. During this period he kept a low profile and didn't talk about his experiences during the war. However, as movements for social justice gained momentum in the 1960’s and 70’s Ueno started to become more comfortable with sharing his story.

In 1985 he gave a tape recorded interview with California State University, Fullerton, oral historian Arthur Hansen which became the basis of the 1986 book Manzanar Martyr. Following the death of his wife in 1987 Ueno started to become more involved in the Japanese American community. He attended several Manzanar pilgrimages and participated in many other public events dedicated to the experiences of himself and other detainees in Manzanar. Ueno also contributed heavily to the Japanese American redress and reparations movement through his affiliation with the National Council for Japanese American Redress (NCJAR) and its class action lawsuit against the U.S. government for wartime damages.

He died on December 14, 2004, from pneumonia in Mountain View at the age of 97.
