= Ralph Lazo =

American teacher and activist

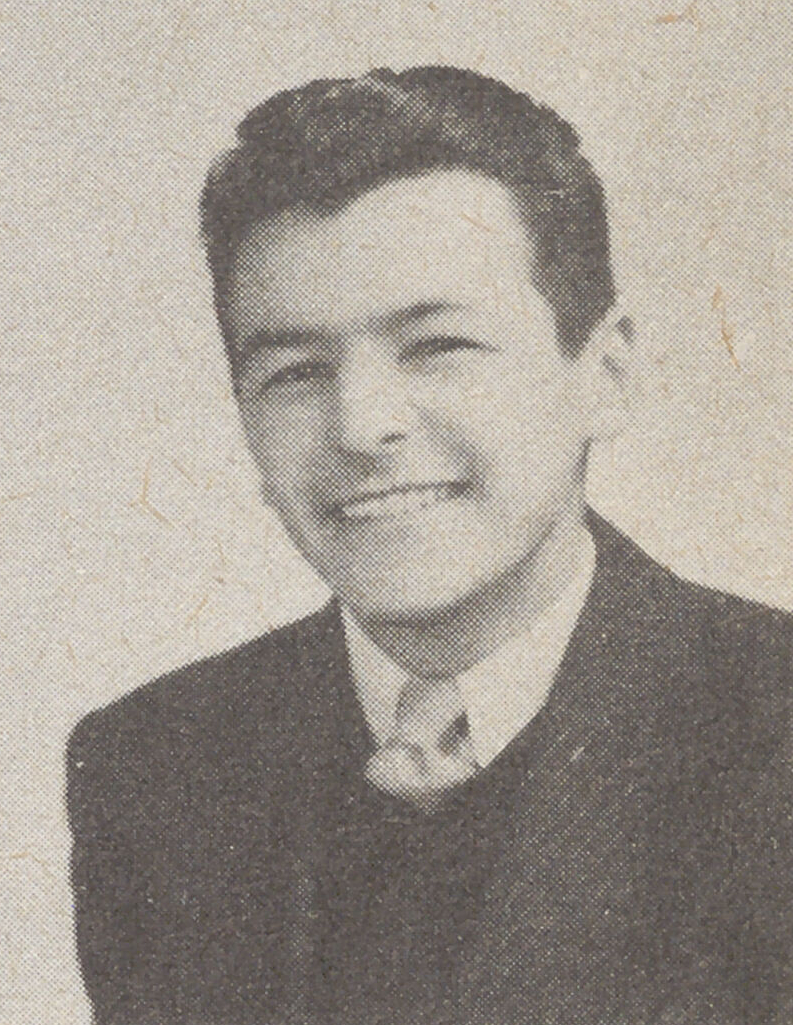
- Lazo in the Manzanar High School yearbook, 1944
- Born: November 3, 1924; Los Angeles, California, U.S.
- Died: January 1, 1992 (aged 67); Los Angeles, California, U.S.
- Education: University of California, Los Angeles; California State University, Northridge
- Occupations: Teacher, soldier
- Military career
- Allegiance: United States
- Branch: United States Army
- Service years: 1944–1946
- Rank: Staff Sergeant
- Conflicts: World War II; Philippines Campaign
- Awards: Bronze Star

Ralph Lazo (November 3, 1924 – January 1, 1992) was the only known non-spouse, non-Japanese American who voluntarily relocated to a Japanese American internment camp during World War II. His experience was the subject of the 2004 narrative short film Stand Up for Justice: The Ralph Lazo Story.

== Biography ==
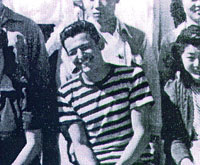
Ralph Lazo in a group photo at Manzanar

Ralph Lazo, born in Los Angeles on November 3, 1924, was of Mexican-American and Irish American descent. His mother died when he and his sister were young, leaving them in the care of their father, who found work painting houses and murals.

As a Belmont High School student at age 17, Lazo learned that his Japanese American friends and neighbors were being forcibly removed as part of the Japanese American Internment and incarcerated at Manzanar. Lazo was so outraged that he joined friends on a train that took hundreds to Manzanar in May 1942. Manzanar officials never asked him about his ancestry.

"Internment was immoral", Lazo told the Los Angeles Times. "It was wrong, and I couldn't accept it." "These people hadn't done anything that I hadn't done except to go to Japanese language school."

Lazo attended school at the camp, and also spent time entertaining orphaned children who had been forcibly relocated to Manzanar. In 1944, Lazo was elected president of his class at Manzanar High School. After his graduation, he remained at the camp until August 1944, when he was inducted into the US Army. He served as a staff sergeant in the South Pacific until 1946, helping liberate the Philippines. Lazo was awarded the Bronze Star for heroism in combat. The film Stand Up for Justice: The Ralph Lazo Story documents his life story, particularly his stand against the incarceration.

After the war, Lazo returned to Los Angeles, where he graduated from UCLA with a degree in sociology and earned a master's degree in education from Cal State Northridge. Lazo spent his career teaching, including at Los Angeles Valley College, mentoring disabled students and encouraging Latinos to attend college and vote. Lazo also helped raise funds for a class-action lawsuit to win reparations for Japanese Americans interned during the war, which resulted in the Civil Liberties Act of 1988. This act offered an apology to interned Japanese Americans on behalf of the U.S. government and stated that the internment was based on "race prejudice, war hysteria, and a failure of political leadership."

Lazo died in 1992 from liver cancer, at the age of 67.
