= Manzanar =

World War II internment camp in California, US

- Manzanar War Relocation Center
- U.S. National Register of Historic Places
- U.S. National Historic Landmark
- U.S. National Historic Site
- California Historical Landmark
- Los Angeles Historic-Cultural Monument
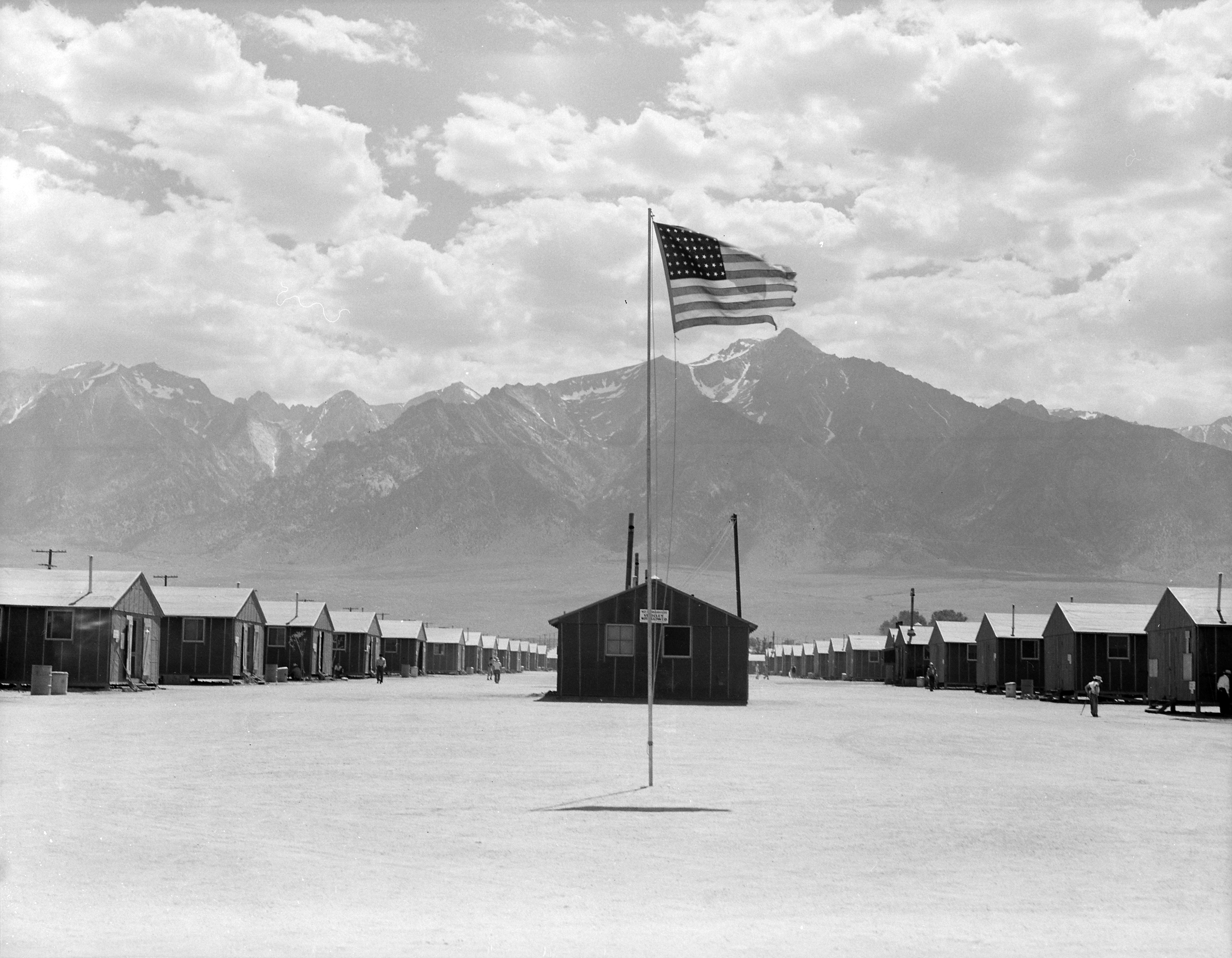
- A hot windstorm brings dust from the surrounding desert, July 3, 1942

- Location within California Location within the United States
- Location: Inyo County, California
- Nearest city: Independence, California
- Coordinates: 36°43′42″N 118°9′16″W
- Area: 814 acres (329 ha)
- Built: 1942
- Visitation: 95,764 (2025)
- Website: Manzanar National Historic Site
- NRHP reference No.: 76000484
- CHISL No.: 850
- LAHCM No.: 160

Significant dates
- Added to NRHP: July 30, 1976
- Designated NHL: February 4, 1985
- Designated NHS: March 3, 1992
- Designated CHISL: 1972
- Designated LAHCM: September 15, 1976

Manzanar is the site of one of ten American concentration camps, where more than 120,000 Japanese Americans were incarcerated during World War II, from March 1942 to November 1945. Although it had over 10,000 inmates at its peak, Manzanar was one of the smaller internment camps. It is located in California's Owens Valley, on the eastern side of the Sierra Nevada mountains, between the towns of Lone Pine to the south and Independence to the north, approximately 230 miles (370 km) north of Los Angeles. Manzanar means "apple orchard" in Spanish. The Manzanar National Historic Site, which preserves and interprets the legacy of Japanese American incarceration in the United States, was identified by the United States National Park Service as the best-preserved of the ten former camp sites.

The first Japanese Americans arrived at Manzanar in March 1942, just one month after President Franklin D. Roosevelt signed Executive Order 9066, to build the camp their families would be staying in. Manzanar was in operation as an internment camp from 1942 until 1945. Since the last of those incarcerated left in 1945, former detainees and others have worked to protect Manzanar and to establish it as a National Historic Site to ensure that the history of the site, along with the stories of those who were incarcerated there, is recorded for current and future generations. The primary focus is the Japanese American incarceration era, as specified in the legislation that created the Manzanar National Historic Site. The site also interprets the former town of Manzanar, the ranch days, the settlement by the Owens Valley Paiute, and the role that water played in shaping the history of the Owens Valley.

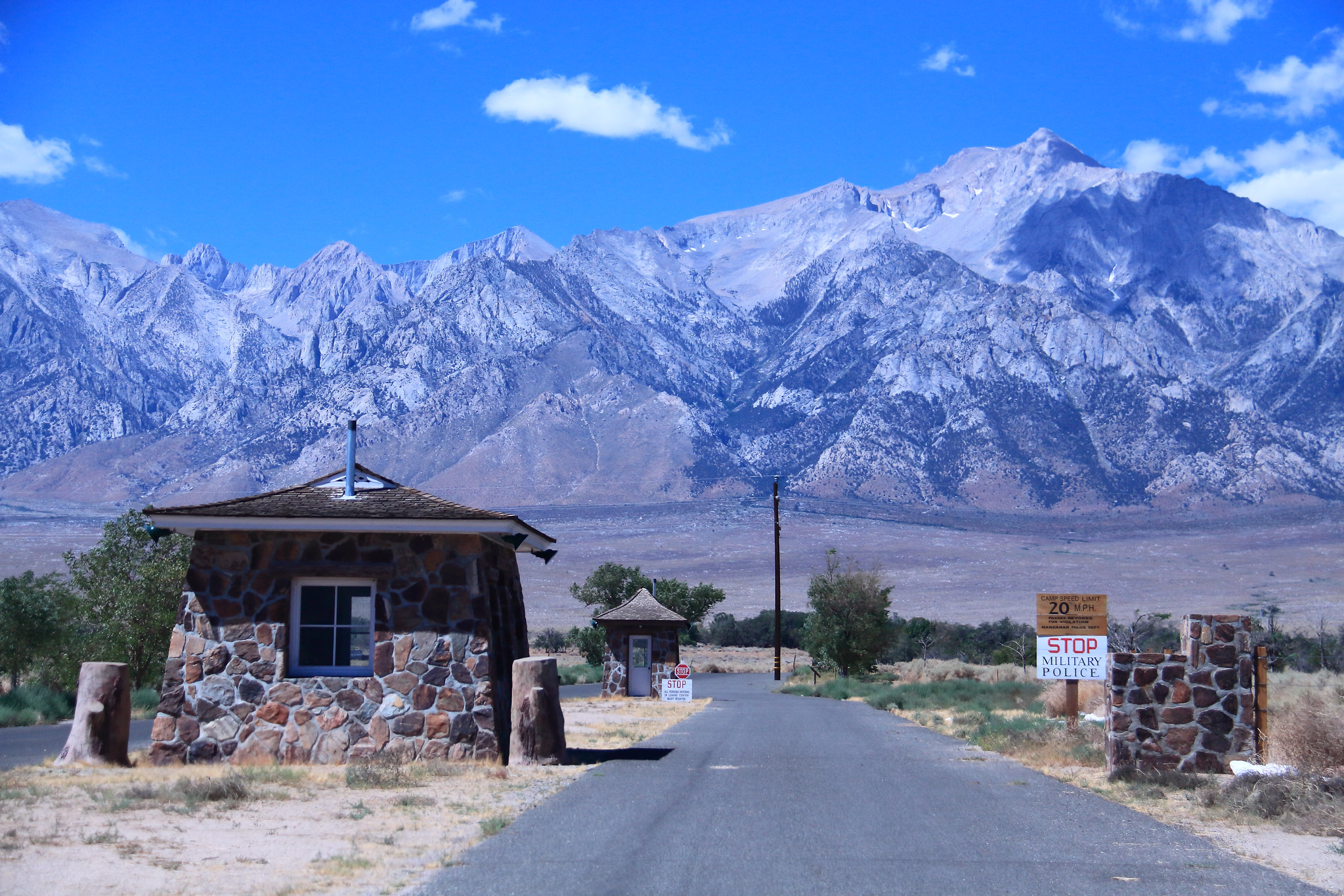
View of original entrance to Manzanar internment camp, November 2024

== Background ==
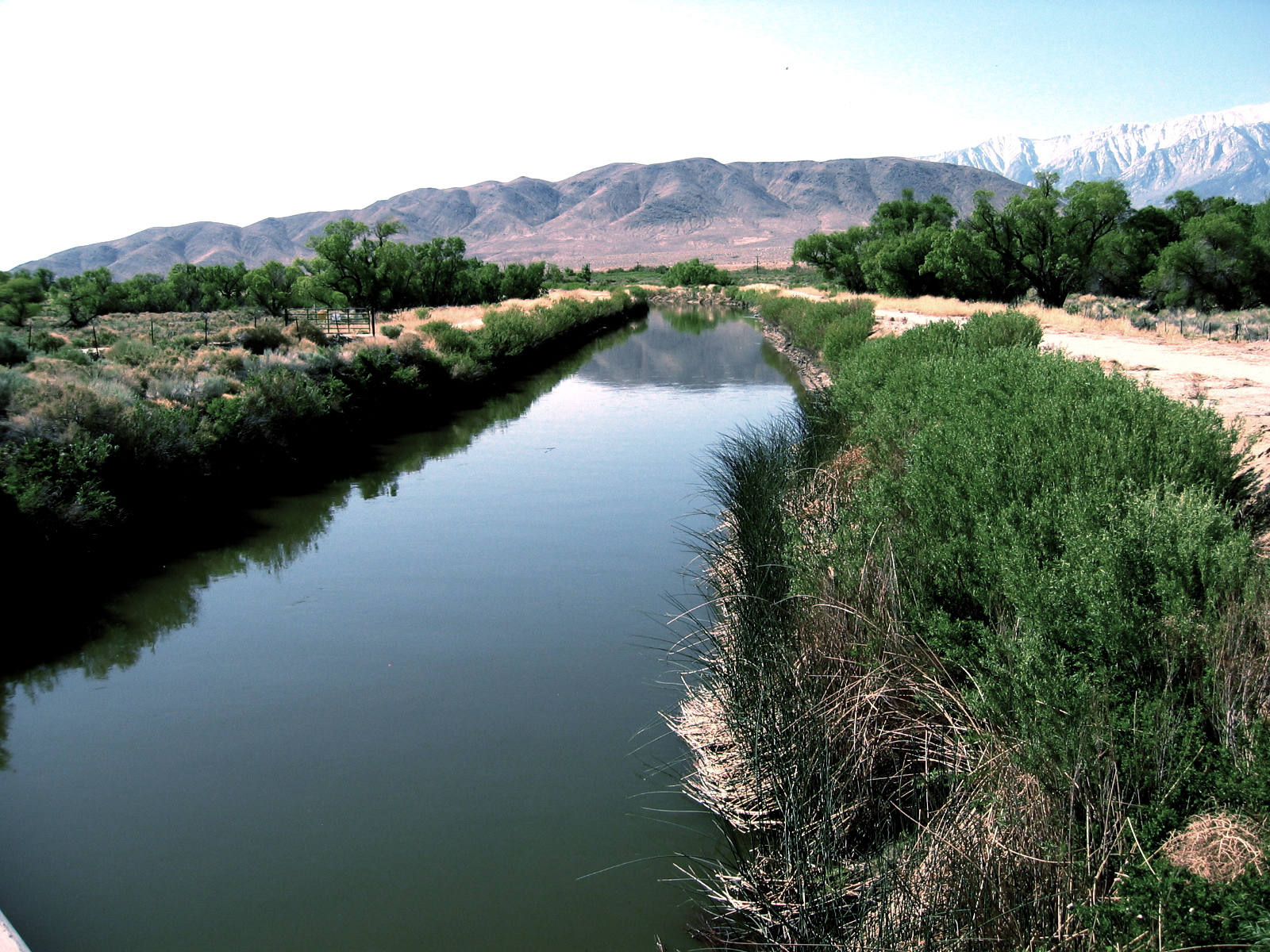
Unlined section of the Los Angeles Aqueduct, just south of Manzanar near U.S. Route 395, 2007

Manzanar was first inhabited by Indigenous Americans nearly 10,000 years ago. Approximately 1,500 years ago, the area was settled by the Owens Valley Paiute, who ranged across the Owens Valley from Long Valley on the north to Owens Lake on the south, and from the crest of the Sierra Nevada on the west to the Inyo Mountains on the east. When European American settlers first arrived in the Owens Valley in the mid-19th century, they found a number of large Paiute villages in the Manzanar area. John Shepherd, one of the first of the new settlers, homesteaded 160 acres (65 ha) of land 3 miles (5 km) north of Georges Creek in 1864. With the help of Owens Valley Paiute field workers and laborers, he expanded his ranch to 2,000 acres (810 ha).

In 1905, George Chaffey, an agricultural developer from Southern California, purchased Shepherd's ranch and subdivided it, along with other adjacent ranches. He founded the town of Manzanar in 1910, along the main line of the Southern Pacific. By August 1911, the town's population was approaching 200. The company built an irrigation system over an area of 1,000 acres (400 ha) and planted about 20,000 fruit trees. By 1920, the town had more than 25 homes, a two-room school, a town hall, and a general store. Also at that time, nearly 5,000 acres (2,000 ha) of apple, pear, and peach trees were under cultivation; along with crops of grapes, prunes, potatoes, corn and alfalfa; and large vegetable and flower gardens.

As early as March 1905, the City of Los Angeles began acquiring water rights in the Owens Valley. In 1913, it completed construction of its 233-mile (375 km) Los Angeles Aqueduct, In dry years, Los Angeles pumped ground water and drained all surface water, diverting all of it into its aqueduct and leaving Owens Valley ranchers without water. Without water for irrigation, the holdout ranchers were forced off their ranches and out of their communities; that included the town of Manzanar, which was abandoned by 1929. Manzanar remained uninhabited until the United States Army leased 6,200 acres (2,500 ha) from the City of Los Angeles for the Manzanar War Relocation Center.

== Establishment ==
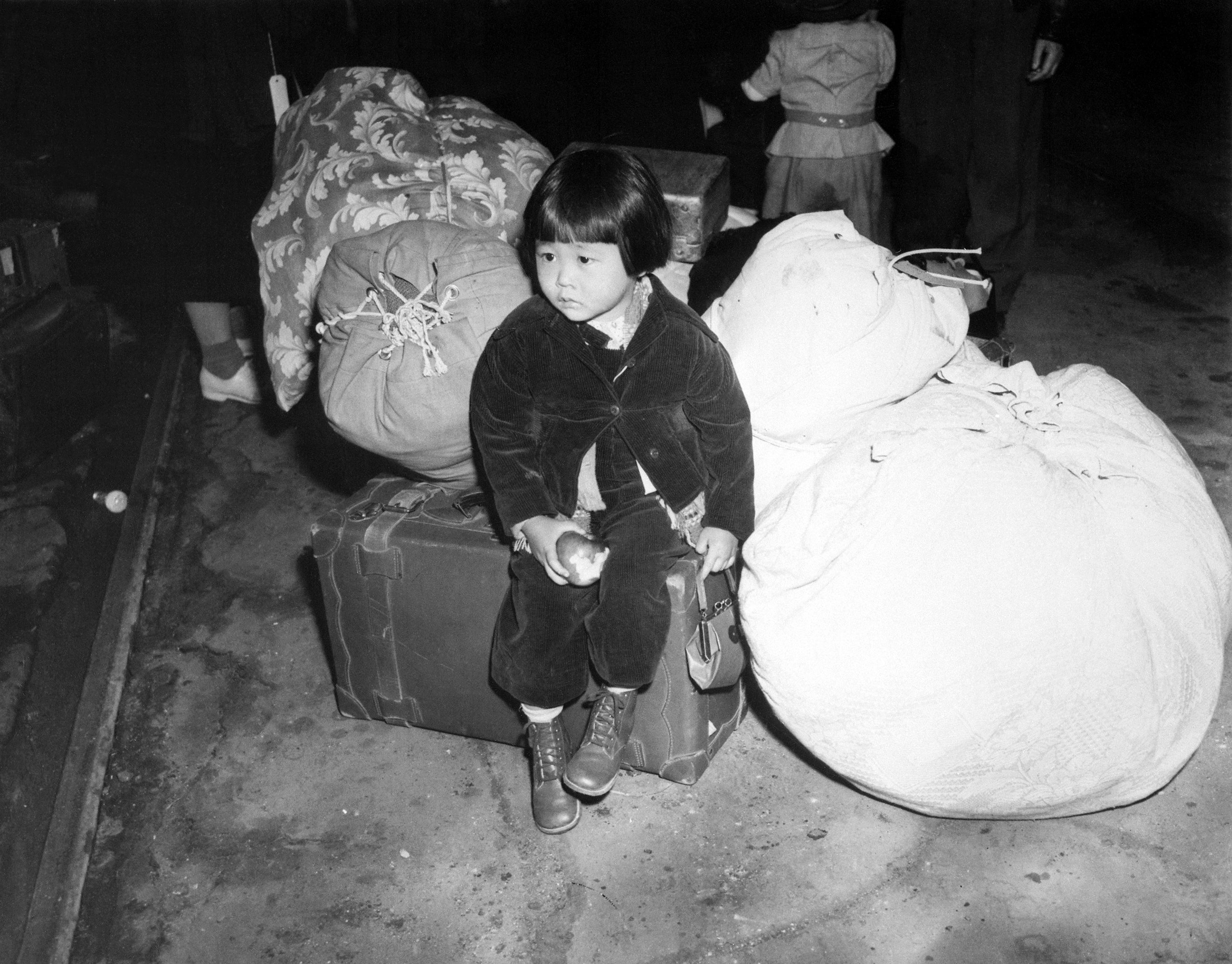
Two-year-old Yuki Okinaga Hayakawa waits at Union Station for the train taking her and her mother to Manzanar (April 1942)

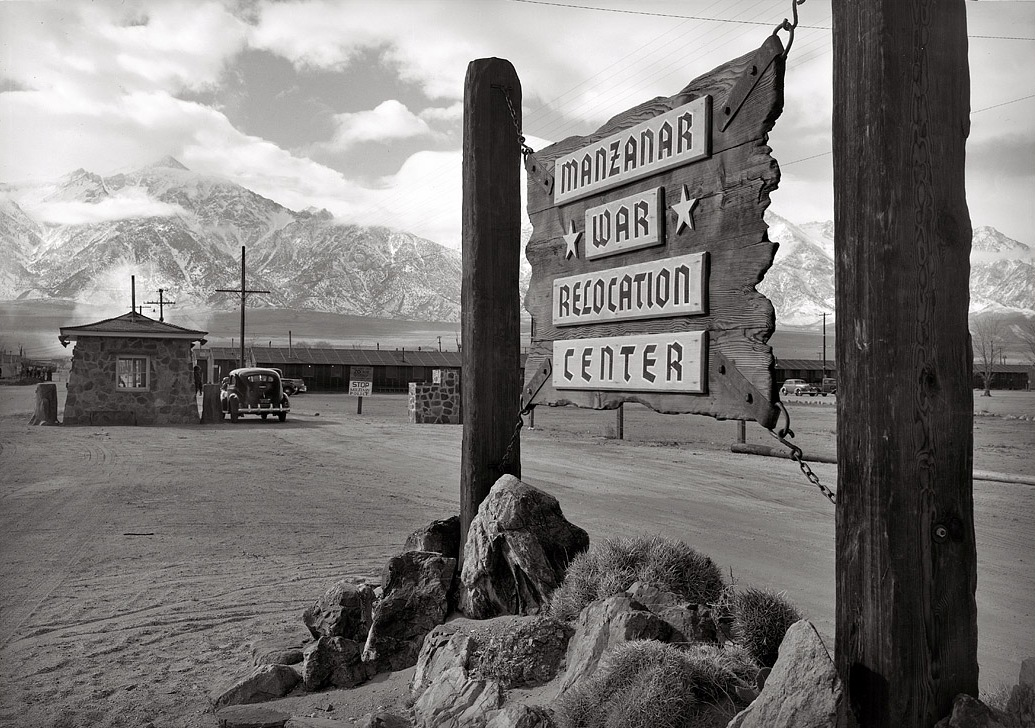
Wooden sign at entrance to the Manzanar War Relocation Center

After the December 7, 1941, attack on Pearl Harbor, the United States Government swiftly moved to begin solving the "Japanese Problem" on the West Coast of the United States. In the evening hours of that same day, the Federal Bureau of Investigation (FBI) arrested selected "enemy aliens", including more than 5,500 Issei men. Many citizens in California were alarmed about potential activities by people of Japanese descent even if the families have been in America for generations.

On February 19, 1942, President Franklin D. Roosevelt signed Executive Order 9066, which authorized the Secretary of War to designate military commanders to prescribe military areas and to exclude "any or all persons" from such areas. The order also authorized the construction of what were later called "relocation centers" by the War Relocation Authority (WRA), to house those who were to be excluded. This order resulted in the forced relocation of more than 120,000 Japanese Americans, two-thirds of whom were native-born American citizens; the rest had been prevented from becoming citizens by federal law. Over 110,000 were incarcerated in ten concentration camps located far inland and away from the coast.

Manzanar was the first of the ten concentration camps to be established, and began accepting detainees in March 1942. Initially, it was a temporary "reception center", known as the Owens Valley Reception Center from March 21, 1942, to May 31, 1942. At that time, it was operated by the US Army's Wartime Civilian Control Administration (WCCA). The first director of the camp was Calvin E. Triggs, a longtime veteran of the Works Progress Administration (WPA), a signature program of the Second New Deal. Many of his fellow employees had worked in that agency. Manzanar, according to one insider, was "manned just about 100% by the WPA." Drawing on experiences derived from New Deal era road building, Triggs, funded primarily through the WPA, supervised the installation of such features as guard towers and spotlights.

The Owens Valley Reception Center was transferred to the WRA on June 1, 1942, and officially became the "Manzanar War Relocation Center". The first Japanese Americans to arrive at Manzanar were volunteers who helped build the camp. By mid–April, up to 1,000 Japanese Americans were arriving daily, and by July, the population of the camp neared 10,000. About 90 percent of the incarcerated were from the Los Angeles area, with the rest coming from Stockton, California; and Bainbridge Island, Washington. Many were farmers and fishermen. Manzanar held 10,046 adults and children at its peak, and a total of 11,070 were incarcerated there.

== Camp conditions and facilities ==
=== Climate and location ===
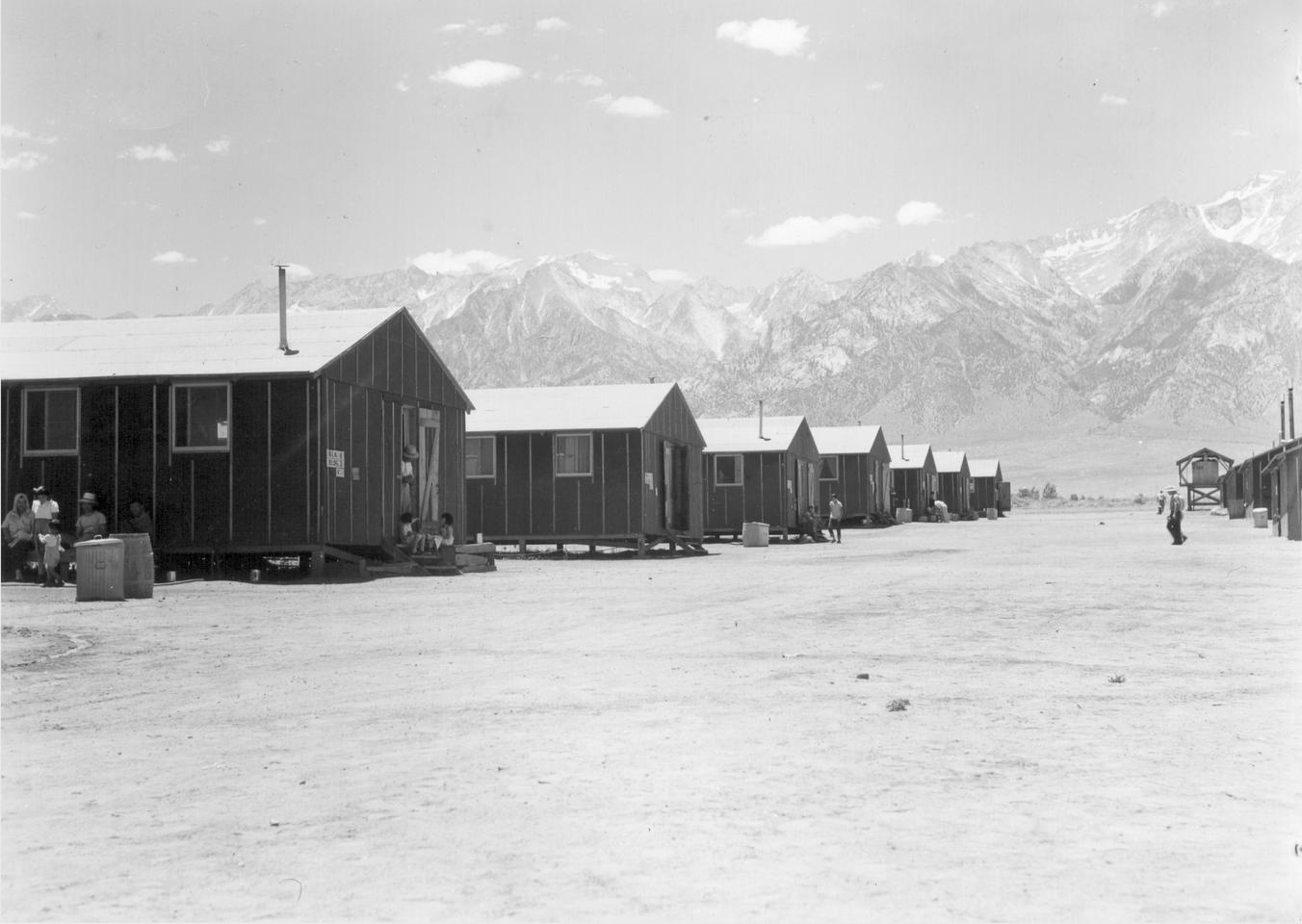
Barrack row looking west to the desert and mountains beyond (July 2, 1942)

The Manzanar facility was located between Lone Pine and Independence. The weather at Manzanar caused suffering for the inmates, few of whom were accustomed to the extremes of the area's climate. While the majority of people were from the Los Angeles area, some were from places with much different climates (such as Bainbridge Island in Washington). The temporary buildings were inadequate to shield people from the weather. The Owens Valley lies at an elevation of about 4,000 feet (1,200 m).

Summers on the desert floor of the Owens Valley are generally hot, with temperatures often exceeding 100 °F (38 °C). Winters bring occasional snowfall and daytime temperatures that often drop into the 40 °F (4 °C) range. At night, temperatures are generally 30 to 40 °F (17 to 22 °C) lower than the daytime highs, and high winds are common day or night.

The area's mean annual precipitation is barely five inches (13 cm). The ever-present dust was a continual problem due to the frequent high winds; so much so that people usually woke up in the morning covered from head to toe with a fine layer of dust, and they constantly had to sweep dirt out of the barracks.

"In the summer, the heat was unbearable," said former Manzanar inmate Ralph Lazo. "In the winter, the sparsely rationed oil didn't adequately heat the tar paper-covered pine barracks with knotholes in the floor. The wind would blow so hard, it would toss rocks around."

=== Camp layout and facilities ===
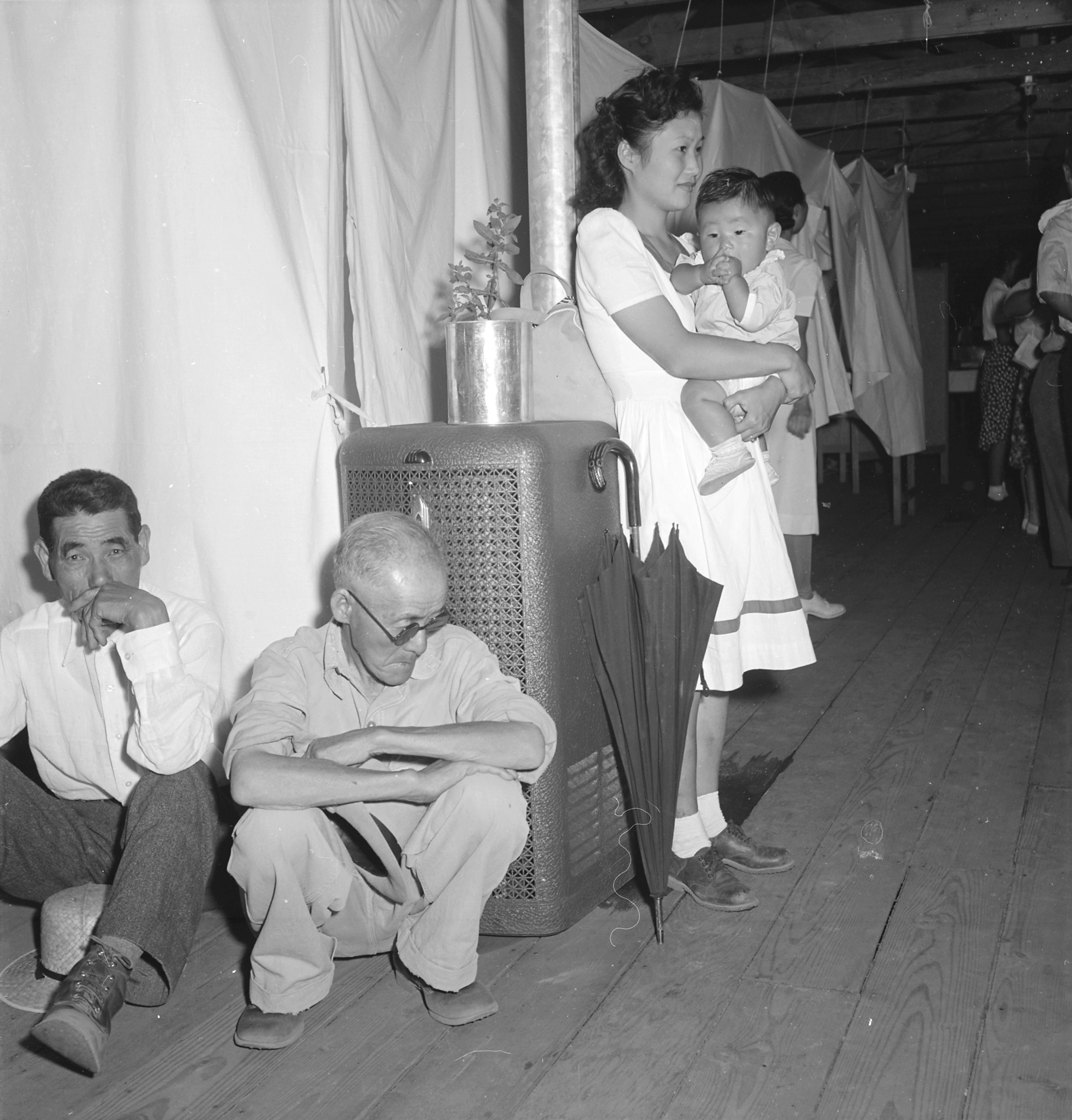
Typical barrack apartments with cloth partitions between units (June 30, 1942)

The camp site was situated on 6,200 acres (2,500 ha) at Manzanar, leased from the City of Los Angeles, with the developed portion covering approximately 540 acres (220 ha). Eight guard towers equipped with machine guns were located at intervals around the perimeter fence, which was topped by barbed wire. The grid layout used in the camp was standard, and a similar layout was used in all of the relocation centers.

The residential area was about one square mile (2.6 km^{2}), and consisted of 36 blocks of hastily constructed, 20-by-100-foot (6.1 by 30.5 m) tarpaper barracks, with each family (up to eight people) living in a single 20-by-25-foot (6.1 by 7.6 m) "apartment" in the barracks.

Jeanne Wakatsuki Houston, a Manzanar internee, described the living conditions in her book: "After dinner we were taken to Block 16, a cluster of fifteen barracks that had just been finished a day or so earlier—although finished was hardly a word for it. The shacks were built of pine planking covered with tarpaper. They sat on concrete footings, with about two feet of open space between the floorboards and the ground. Gaps showed between the planks, and as the weeks passed and the green wood dried out, the gaps widened. Knotholes gaped in the uncovered floor." In the book, she goes on to explain the size and layout of the barracks. They were divided into six units that were sixteen long by twenty feet wide, and a single light bulb hung from the ceiling. They had an oil stove for heat as well as two army blankets each, some mattress covers and steel army cots.

These apartments consisted of partitions with no ceilings, eliminating any chance of privacy. Lack of privacy was a major problem, especially since the camp had communal men's and women's latrines. Former Manzanar inmate Rosie Kakuuchi said that the communal facilities were "[o]ne of the hardest things to endure", adding that neither the latrines nor showers had partitions or stalls.

Each residential block also had a communal mess hall (large enough to serve 300 people at one time), a laundry room, a recreation hall, an ironing room, and a heating oil storage tank, although Block 33 lacked a recreation hall. In addition to the residential blocks, Manzanar had 34 blocks that had staff housing, camp administration offices, two warehouses, a garage, a camp hospital, and 24 firebreaks.

The camp had school facilities, a high-school auditorium (that was also used as a theatre), staff housing, chicken and hog farms, churches, a cemetery, a post office, a hospital, an orphanage, two community latrines, an outdoor theater, and other necessary amenities that one would expect to find in most American cities. Some of the facilities were not built until after the camp had been operating for a while. The camp perimeter had eight watchtowers manned by armed military police, and it was enclosed by five-strand barbed wire. There were sentry posts at the main entrance. Many of the camp administration staff lived inside the fence at the camp, though the military police lived outside the fence.

=== Commercial facilities ===
Typical businesses such as a cooperative store and other shops and a camp newspaper were operated by the internees. A camouflage net factory, to provide the nets to various military units, was operated on the site. An experimental plantation for producing natural rubber from the Guayule plant was built and operated.

Before a hospital was built, doctors in the camp faced many difficulties, including treating internees for diseases such as measles, chickenpox, whooping cough, and diarrhea. Treatment facilities were often the barracks, which did not include running water or heating. Once the Manzanar Hospital was built, it included a kitchen, operating rooms, treatment wards, laboratories, and other facilities. All medical treatment in Manzanar was provided at no charge.

Manzanar Children's Village, an orphanage housing 101 Japanese-American orphans from June 1942 to September 1945, operated within the camp. Children incarcerated there were from multiple orphanages in the Los Angeles area as well as locations in Washington, Oregon, and Alaska. Infants born to unmarried mothers in other WRA camps were also sent to Children's Village over the next three years.

The 61 remaining children in Maryknoll, Shonien and the Salvation Army Home were slated for removal. On June 23, 1942, they were bused, under armed guard, with several adult caretakers, from Los Angeles to Manzanar. Over the next few months, approximately thirty more children from Washington, Oregon and Alaska, mostly orphans who had been living with non-Japanese foster families, would arrive in Manzanar.

== Life in camp ==
After being uprooted from their homes and communities, the incarcerated people had to endure primitive, sub-standard conditions and lack of privacy. They had to wait in line for meals, at latrines, and at the laundry room. Each camp was intended to be self-sufficient, and Manzanar was no exception. Cooperatives operated various services, such as the camp newspaper, beauty salons and barber shops, shoe repair, libraries, and more. In addition, there were some who raised chickens, hogs, and vegetables, and cultivated the existing orchards for fruit. During the time Manzanar was in operation, 188 weddings were held, 541 children were born in the camp, and between 135 and 146 individuals died.

Some of those interned at the camp supported the policies implemented by the War Relocation Authority, causing them to be targeted by others in the camp. On December 6, 1942, a riot broke out and two internees were killed. Togo Tanaka was one of those targeted, but he escaped by disguising himself and mingling into the crowd that was searching for him. Others were outraged that their patriotism was being questioned simply because of their ethnic heritage. Despite the hardships endured, the internees gradually "turned [the] concentration camp into a community" by "[spending] their days creating beautiful things".

=== Food ===
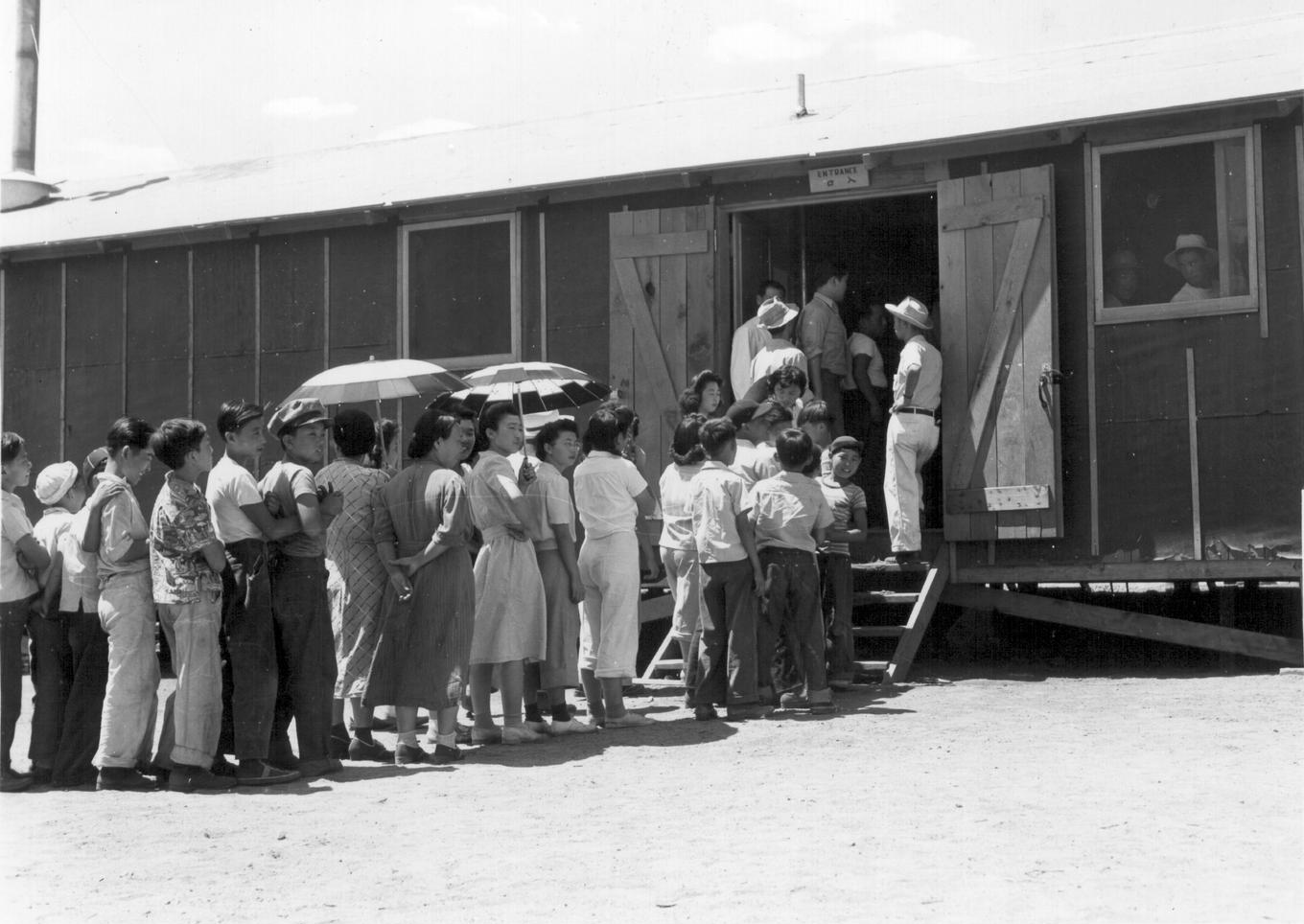
Waiting for lunch outside a mess hall at noon on July 7, 1942

The barracks at Manzanar had no cooking areas, and all meals were served at block mess halls. The mess hall lines were long and stretched outside regardless of weather. The cafeteria-style eating was named by the 1980s Congressional Committee on the Wartime Relocation and Internment of Civilians (CWRIC) as a cause of the deterioration of the family due to children wanting to eat with their friends instead of their families, and families not always being able to eat together. There was a strict meal schedule, with one young detainee noting "We eat from 7:00 AM to 8:00 AM o'clock in the morning 12:00 PM-1:00 PM in afternoon and 5:00 PM-6:00 in night and on Sunday we eat 8:00 AM-9:00." Food at Manzanar was based on military requirements. Meals usually consisted of hot rice and vegetables, since meat was scarce due to rationing.

In 1944, a chicken ranch and a hog farm began operation, providing the camp with meat. As many of the internees were farmers, they used their knowledge of fertilizers, irrigation, land reclamation, and cultivation to successfully grow productive gardens. They made their own soy sauce and tofu. Many families had small gardens outside their barracks.

The food varied in quality, but was mostly substandard compared to the food the internees ate prior to incarceration. Togo Tanaka described how people "got sick from eating ill-prepared food." Aiko Herzig-Yoshinaga described trying to take care of her newborn daughter, saying that the child was so sick that, while "[m]ost infants double their weight, birth weight, at six months", her daughter "had not doubled her weight in a year".

The food in Manzanar was heavily starchy and low quality, including Vienna sausages, canned string beans, hot dogs, and apple sauce. Outside of the sausages and hot dogs, meat was rare, usually consisting of chicken or mutton that was heavily breaded and fried. Frank Kikuchi, an internee at Manzanar, stated that some of the newspapers lied to the American public by telling them that the "Japs [in the camps] are getting steaks, chops, eggs, or eating high off the hog." Camp, school, and individual gardens eventually helped supplement the menu in the mess halls. Internees also snuck out of the camp to go fishing, often bringing back their catches to the camp.

Harry Ueno accused camp administrators and leaders in the Japanese American Citizens League (JACL) of stealing food meant for the internees and then selling it on the black market. During the December 1942 camp riot, Ueno was arrested for allegedly beating another internee who was a member of the JACL.

=== Employment ===
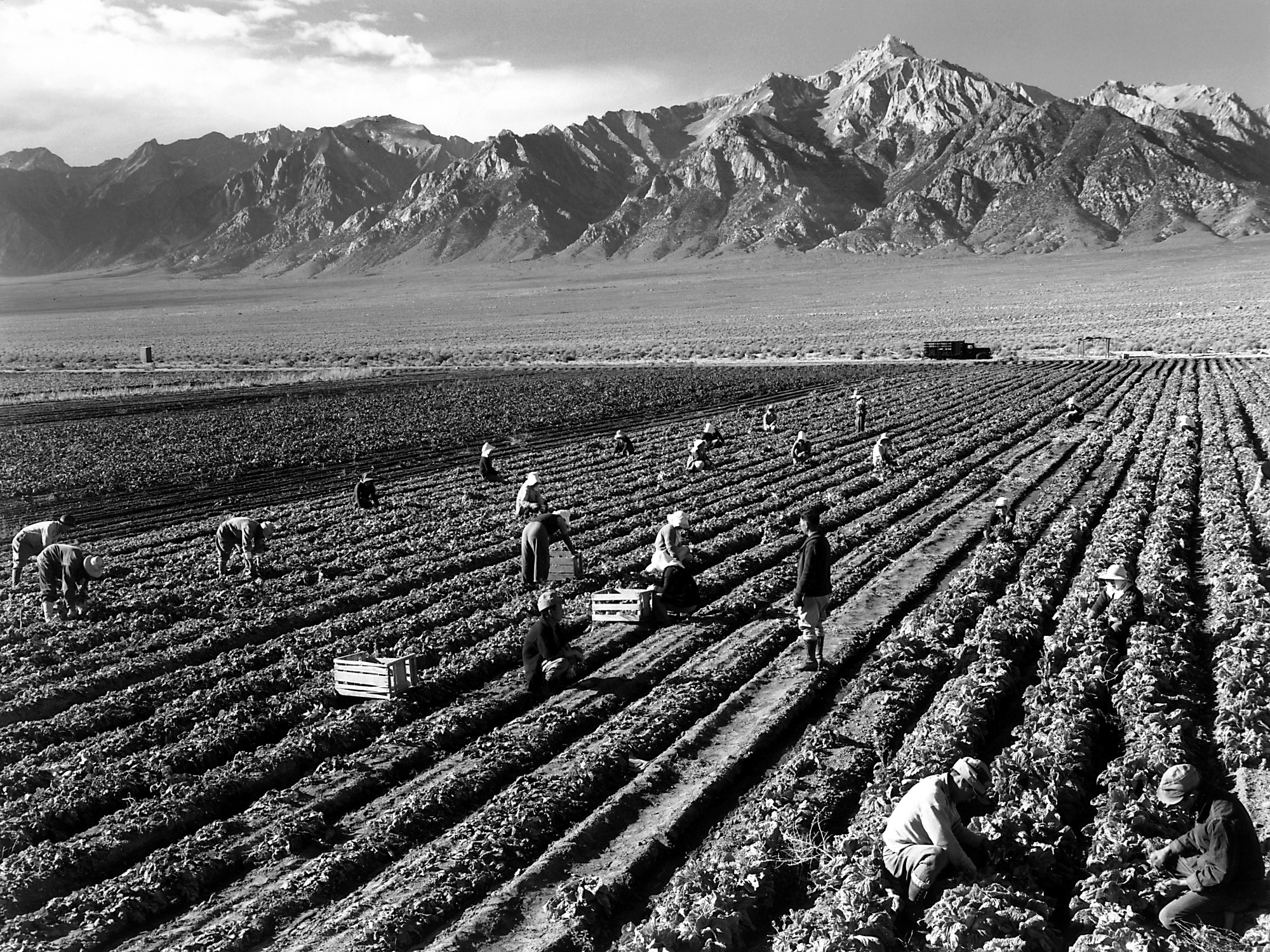
Farm workers at Manzanar, 1943 by Ansel Adams

Most of the adults were employed at Manzanar to keep the camp running. In order for the camps to be self-sufficient, the adults were employed in a variety of jobs to supply the camp and the military. Jobs included clothing and furniture manufacturing, farming and tending orchards, military manufacturing such as camouflage netting and experimental rubber, teaching, civil service jobs such as police, fire fighters, and nursing, and general service jobs operating stores, beauty parlors, and a bank.

A farm and orchards provided vegetables and fruits for use by the camp, and people of all ages worked to maintain them. By the summer of 1943, camp gardens and farms were producing potatoes, onions, cucumbers, Chinese cabbage, watermelon, eggplant, tomatoes, aster, red radishes, and peppers. Eventually, there were more than 400 acres of farms producing more than 80 percent of the produce used by the camp. In early 1944, a chicken ranch began operation, and in late April of the same year, the camp opened a hog farm. Both operations provided welcome meat supplements to the diet.

Shortly after being interned, Togo Tanaka and Joe Masaoka were hired by anthropologist Robert Redfield as documentary historians for the camp. In addition to his work at the Manzanar Free Press, he filed hundreds of reports to the WRA that often criticized those in charge at the camp and the living conditions in the camp.

Unskilled workers earned US$8 per month ($157.6 per month as of 2025), semi-skilled workers earned $12 per month ($236 per month as of 2025), skilled workers made $16 per month ($315 per month as of 2025), and professionals earned $19 per month ($374 per month as of 2025). In addition, everybody received $3.60 per month ($71 per month as of 2025) as a clothing allowance.

=== Manzanar Free Press ===
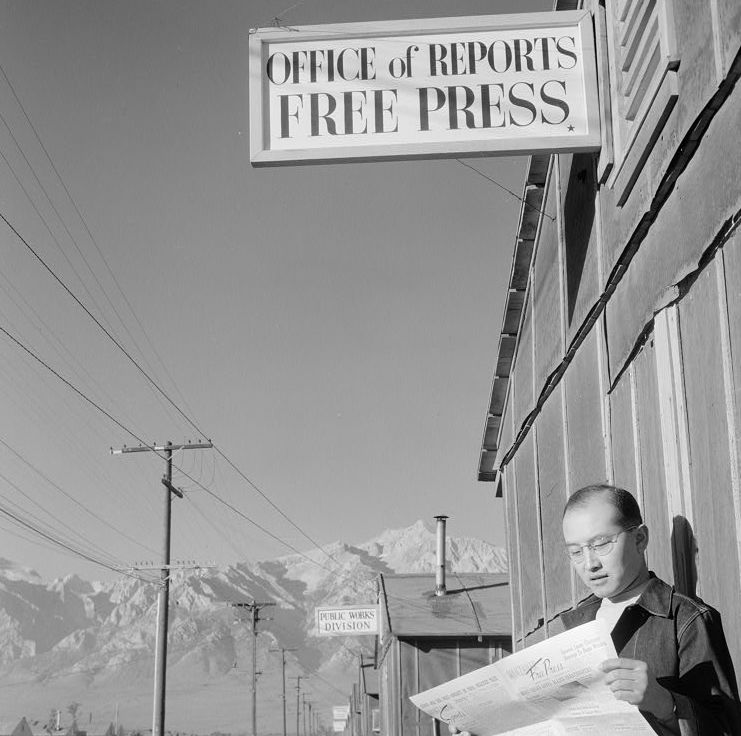
Roy Takeno reading a copy of the Manzanar Free Press in front of the newspaper's office in the camp

The Manzanar Free Press was first published April 11, 1942, and was published through the October 19, 1945, issue. It was published with both Japanese and English sections, with the Japanese section added on July 14, 1942. Between the first issue and the May 31, 1942, issue, it was published at the Manzanar Assembly Center, which was operated by the Wartime Civil Control Administration. After that, it was published at the Manzanar Relocation Center until it ceased publication.

The paper was originally published as four pages biweekly which were hand-typed and mimeographed. The circulation increased as the number of people in the camp grew, the release increased to three issues weekly, and a printing press was acquired, allowing the paper to be typeset beginning on July 22, 1942. The page count also increased to six.

Journalists who reported for the newspaper include Togo Tanaka, who was the English section editor of the Rafu Shimpo before being incarcerated. Tanaka also delivered the Free Press before becoming a journalist for them. While working as a reporter for the Free Press, Tanaka wrote hundreds of articles documenting the everyday life in the camp. Beginning on July 22, 1942, Chiye Mori, poet and journalist, was listed as an editor.

Despite the name of the newspaper, the War Relocation Authority (WRA) controlled the content of the paper and used it to publish announcements from the camp administration, news from other camps, orders, rules and guidelines from the WRA, and upcoming camp events, in addition to the regular content. Some content was not allowed to be published. The standard content included articles about life in the camps, sports scores and coverage, coverage of the war, and so on.

=== Recreation ===
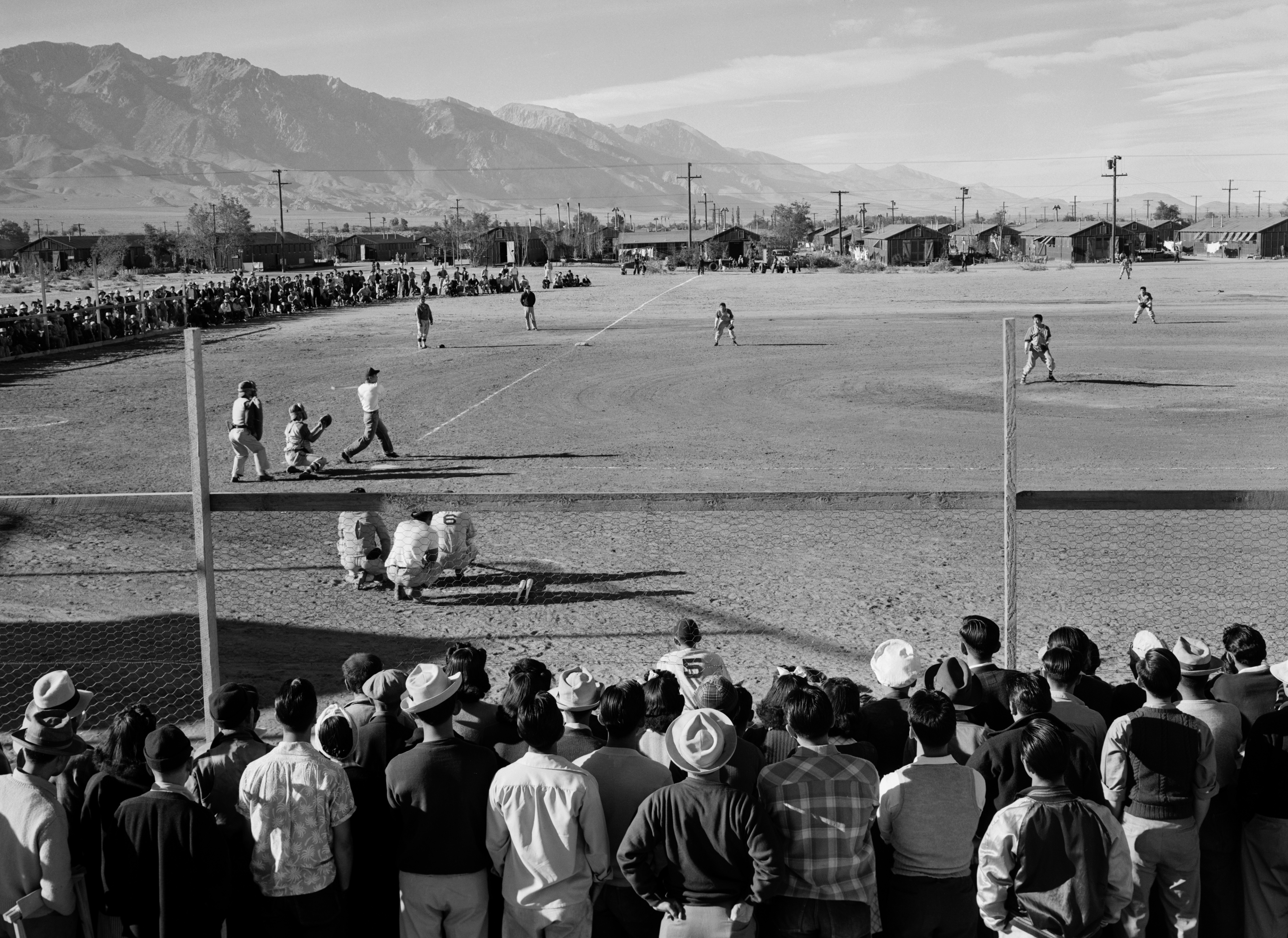
A baseball game at Manzanar, 1943

People made life at Manzanar more tolerable through recreation. They participated in sports, including baseball, football, basketball, soccer, volleyball, softball, and martial arts. A nine-hole golf course was built at the camp. Lou Frizzell served as the musical director, and under his mentorship Mary Nomura became known as the "songbird of Manzanar" for her performances at dances and other camp events. Theatre performances—for internees, camp administration and WRA staff, and even for some members of the surrounding communities—included original productions by internees as well as traditional Japanese works of kabuki and noh.

Internees, many of whom were relocated from their landscaping businesses in the Los Angeles area, personalized and beautified their barren surroundings by building elaborate gardens and parks, which often included pools, waterfalls, and rock ornaments. Competitions were often held between landscapers as they created gardens in the public spaces of the camp (such as between barracks). The camp administration even allowed some gardens to be created outside the camp. These helped create a sense of community and gave the internees a place to heal. Remnants of some of the gardens, pools, and rock ornaments are still present at Manzanar, and there are plans to restore at least some of them.

By far the most popular sports for those incarcerated at Manzanar were baseball and softball. The men there formed almost 100 teams, and the women formed 14. Teams were divided into leagues, regular seasons were established, and championship games held, drawing huge crowds of spectators. Teams included both amateur and semi-professional players. Some players viewed playing baseball as a way to express their American identity, equating it to wearing the American flag. Photographer Ansel Adams took his photo (right) to show how those incarcerated at Manzanar "overcome [their] sense of defeat and despair." Guided by archival photographs and camp newspaper articles, a volunteer-led effort took place from November 2023 to October 2024 to restore the main baseball field.

Many Japanese cultural celebrations were continued, though the official photos allowed out by the WRA rarely showed them. The New Year tradition of mochitsuki—pounding glutinous rice into mochi—was regularly covered by the camp newspaper. Craftsman in the camp carved geta for many of the residents, though the official photography only pointed out that they were useful for keeping above the dusty ground.

=== Manzanar Riot ===
Although most quietly accepted their fate during World War II, there was some resistance in the camps. Poston, Heart Mountain, Topaz, and Tule Lake each had civil disturbances about wage differences, black marketing of sugar, food shortages, intergenerational friction, rumors of "informers" reporting to the camp administration or the FBI, and other issues. The most serious incident occurred at Manzanar on December 5–6, 1942 (with some of the actions on both sides carrying over into the following days), and became known as the "Manzanar Revolt" or "Manzanar Riot".

Some of the tension that precipitated the riot was related to work availability and the pay of those jobs, with Nisei and members of the Japanese American Citizens League (JACL) getting preferential treatment. After several months of tension between those who supported the JACL and a group of Kibei (Japanese Americans educated in Japan), rumors spread that sugar and meat shortages were the result of black marketing by camp administrators. To make matters worse, JACL leader Fred Tayama was beaten by six masked men on the evening of December 5. Harry Ueno, the leader of the Kitchen Workers Union, and two others suspected of involvement, were arrested. The other two suspects were questioned and released, but Ueno was removed from Manzanar.

About 200 internees met on the morning of December 6 in the gardens at the Block 22 mess hall to discuss what they should do, and another meeting was scheduled for a few hours later. Between two and four thousand people gathered at the meeting where they listened to speeches and chose five people to present their grievances to the camp director. The crowd decided to follow the five representatives, which caused the camp director to tell the military police to muster in order to be available to control the crowd. The five representatives demanded that Ueno be released, but the camp director did not immediately agree.

After the crowd began getting more unruly, the director finally agreed to release Ueno if the crowd agreed he should still stand trial, no one attempted to break him out of the camp jail, the five representatives would discuss any further wants with the director, the protesting crowds would disperse and not reassemble, and the five would work to dispel and quiet the protesters. Ueno was then returned to the camp jail in the early evening.

When the five representatives went to verify that Ueno was in the jail, the crowd again returned to protest. Instead of dispersing as asked, they broke into groups to try to find Tayama and kill him. When they were unable to find him in the hospital, they began searching all through the camp for Tayama as well as Tokie Slocum and Togo Tanaka, two other suspected collaborators. When they were unable to find any of them, the searchers began returning toward the jail.

While the smaller search parties were searching the camp, the camp director had been trying to negotiate with the five representatives. This appeared to work initially, but the crowd gradually became more angry and started throwing bottles and rocks at the soldiers. The military police responded with tear gas to disperse them. As people ran to avoid the tear gas, some in the crowd pushed a driverless truck toward the jail. At that moment, the military police fired into the crowd, killing a 17-year-old boy instantly. A 21-year-old man who was shot in the abdomen died a few days later. At least nine to ten other prisoners were wounded, and a military police corporal was wounded by a ricocheting bullet.

That night, some inmates continued attacking suspected collaborators and meeting in small groups while avoiding military police patrols. Over the next several days, internees marked as suspected collaborators were quietly removed from the camp with their families in order to protect them from being beaten or killed by the protesters. These inmates and some of their family members, 66 people in total, were moved to a former CCC camp at Cow Creek in what is now Death Valley National Park (formerly Death Valley National Monument).

=== 100th Infantry Battalion and the 442nd Regimental Combat Team ===
The vanguard of Japanese American (JA) combat units was the 100th Infantry Battalion (Separate) made up of soldiers in the Hawaii National Guard that was formed in June 1942. The training record of the 100th Battalion at Camp McCoy WI from June to December 1942 convinced the War Department to authorize the formation of the 442nd Regimental Combat Team (RCT) on February 1, 1943. More than 12,000 Nisei (second-generation Japanese American) volunteered. Ultimately 2,686 from Hawaii and 1,500 from mainland U.S. internment camps assembled at Camp Shelby, Mississippi in April 1943 for a year of infantry training. In September 1943, the 100th Battalion was deployed to Italy, via Oran, North Africa, with the 442nd RCT joining them in May 1944.

== Closure ==
The WRA closed Manzanar when the final internee left at 11:00 a.m. on November 21, 1945. It was the sixth camp to be closed. Although the Japanese Americans had been brought to the Owens Valley by the United States Government, they had to leave the camp and travel to their next destinations on their own. The WRA gave each person $25 ($447 today), one-way train or bus fare, and meals to those who had less than $600 ($10,730 today).

While many left the camp voluntarily, a significant number refused to leave because they had no place to go after having lost everything when they were forcibly uprooted and removed from their homes. As such, they had to be forcibly removed once again, this time from Manzanar. Indeed, those who refused to leave were generally removed from their barracks, sometimes by force, even if they had no place to go.

Between 135 and 146 Japanese Americans died at Manzanar. Fifteen were buried there, but only five graves remain, as most were reburied elsewhere by their families. The Manzanar cemetery site is marked by a monument that was built by stonemason Ryozo Kado in 1943. An inscription in Kyūjitai semi-cursive script on the front (east side) of the monument reads 慰靈塔 (lit. 'Soul Consoling Tower'; Shinjitai: 慰霊塔; Hiragana: いれいとう, transliteration: ireitō). The inscription on the back (west side) reads "Erected by the Manzanar Japanese" on the left-hand column, and "August 1943" on the right-hand column.

After the camp was closed, the site eventually returned to its original state. Within a couple of years, all the structures had been removed, with the exception of the two sentry posts at the entrance, the cemetery monument, and the former Manzanar High School auditorium, which was purchased by the County of Inyo. The County leased the auditorium to the Independence Veterans of Foreign Wars, who used it as a meeting facility and community theater until 1951. After that, the building was used as a maintenance facility by the Inyo County Road Department.

The site also retained numerous building foundations, portions of the water and sewer systems, the outline of the road grid, some landscaping, and much more. Despite four years of use, the site also retains evidence of the ranches and of the town of Manzanar, as well as artifacts from the days of the Owens Valley Paiute settlement.

== Preservation and remembrance ==
During the war, the War Relocation Authority hired photographers Ansel Adams and Dorothea Lange to document through pictures the Japanese-Americans impacted by the forced relocation, including Manzanar. Togo Tanaka and Joe Masaoka were hired by anthropologist Robert Redfield as documentary historians for the camp on behalf of the WRA.

=== Manzanar Pilgrimage ===
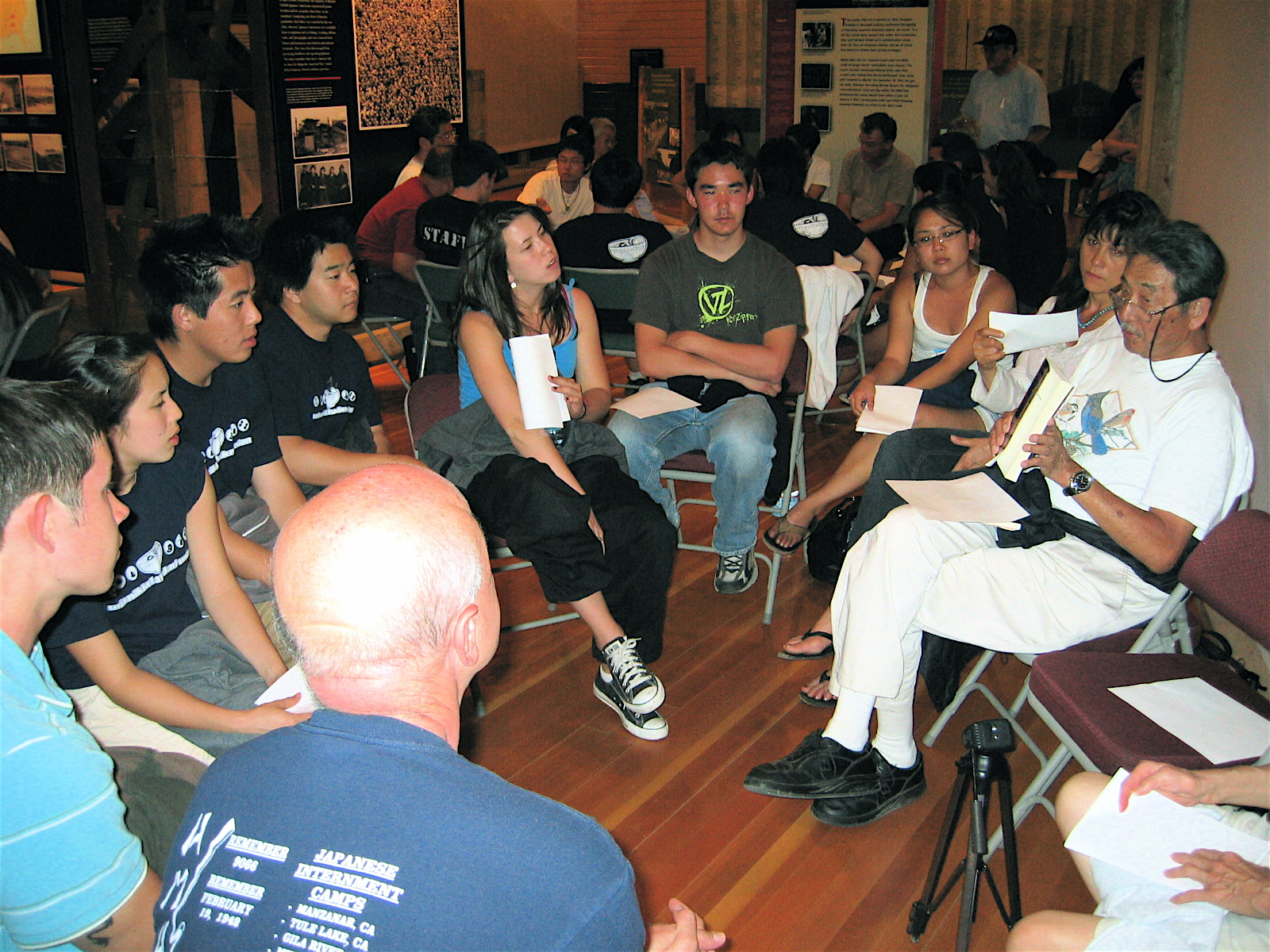
As part of the Manzanar At Dusk program, Wilbur Sato (at far right) relates his experiences in Manzanar during a small group session

On December 21, 1969, about 150 people departed Los Angeles by car and bus, headed for Manzanar. It was the first official annual Manzanar Pilgrimage, though two ministers—the Reverend Sentoku Mayeda and the Reverend Shoichi Wakahiro—had been making annual pilgrimages to Manzanar since the camp closed in 1945.

The non-profit Manzanar Committee, formerly led by Sue Kunitomi Embrey, has sponsored the Pilgrimage since 1969. The event is held annually on the last Saturday of April with hundreds of visitors of all ages and backgrounds, including former inmates, gathering at the Manzanar cemetery to remember the incarceration. The hope is that participants can learn about it and help ensure that what is generally accepted to be a tragic chapter in American history is neither forgotten nor repeated. The program traditionally consists of speakers, cultural performances, an interfaith service to memorialize those who died at Manzanar, and Ondo dancing.

In 1997, the Manzanar At Dusk program became a part of the Pilgrimage. The program attracts local area residents, as well as descendants of Manzanar's ranch days and the town of Manzanar. Through small-group discussions, the event gives participants the opportunity to hear directly from those who had been there and to talk about the relevance of what had happened at Manzanar to their own lives.

Since the September 11 attacks, American Muslims have participated in the Pilgrimage to promote and increase awareness of civil rights protections in the wake of widespread suspicions harbored against them post-9/11. A group of 150 Muslims visited in 2017, in part to compare treatment of Japanese-Americans during World War II with how Muslims are treated following the 9/11 attacks. Over 2,000 people visited the site on April 27, 2019, for the 50th anniversary of the first pilgrimage, including a number of Muslim speakers, and a group of Muslims held afternoon prayers at the monument.

=== Designations ===
The Manzanar Committee's efforts resulted in the State of California naming Manzanar as California Historical Landmark #850 in 1972, with an historical marker being placed at the sentry post on April 14, 1973. Manzanar, which had been historically owned by the City of Los Angeles, was registered as a Los Angeles Historic-Cultural Monument in 1976.

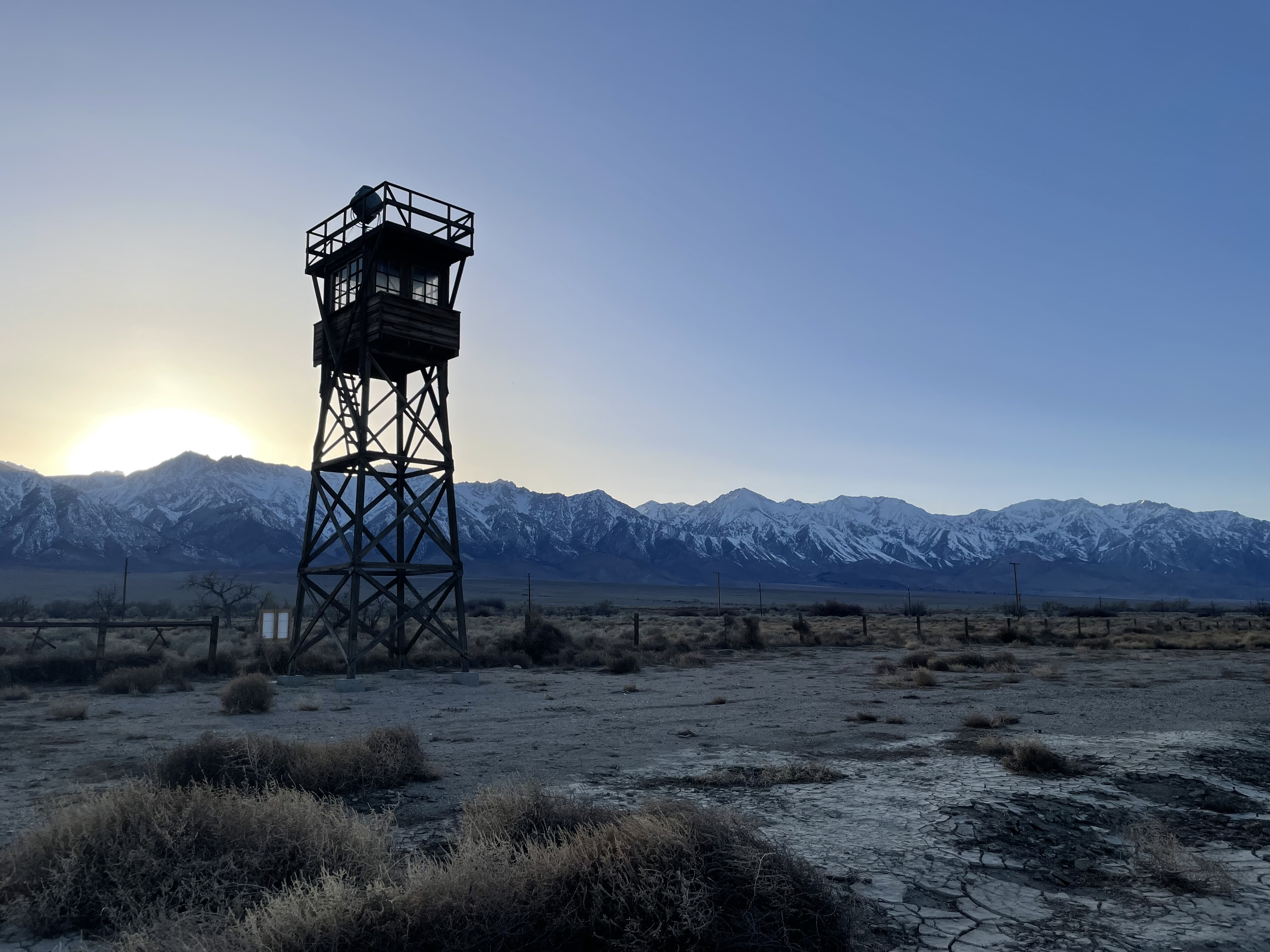
Replica watch tower at the Manzanar National Historic Site, 2024

The Manzanar Committee also spearheaded efforts for Manzanar to be listed in the National Register of Historic Places, and in February 1985, Manzanar was designated a National Historic Landmark. Embrey and the committee, along with California representative Mel Levine, led the effort to have Manzanar designated a National Historic Site, and on March 3, 1992, President George H. W. Bush signed House Resolution 543 into law. This act of Congress established the Manzanar National Historic Site "to provide for the protection and interpretation of the historical, cultural, and natural resources associated with the relocation of Japanese Americans during World War II." Five years later, the National Park Service acquired 814 acres (329 ha) of land at Manzanar from the City of Los Angeles. It was the first of the camps to be designated as a National Historical Site.

After Congress named Manzanar a National Historic Site and gave the National Park Service the job of restoring the site in 1992, protests against its creation emerged. Letters were sent to the National Park Service included statements that Manzanar should be portrayed as a guest housing center, with others stating that calling the site a concentration camp is "treason", threatening dismissal campaigns against National Park Service employees and other related individuals, threatening to destroy buildings, and objecting to the use of the phrase "concentration camp" on signage at the site. The California State historical marker was hacked and stained, with the first "C" of "concentration camp" ground off. A man describing himself as a World War II veteran stated that he had driven 200 miles to urinate on the marker.

== Monument facilities and setting ==
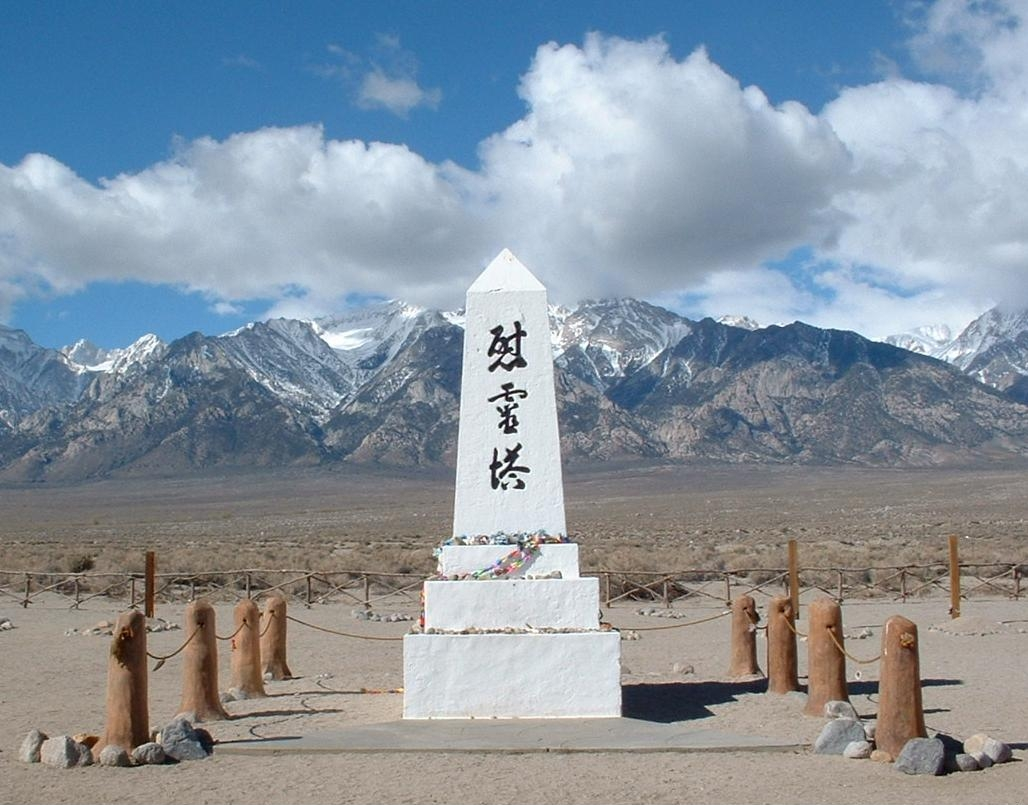
Monument at Manzanar cemetery, 2002

The site features a visitor center with a gift shop, housed in the historically restored Manzanar High School Auditorium with a reconstructed stage proscenium. The auditorium and the two sentry posts at the entrance are the only original structures from the time the camp was operating during World War II. Permanent exhibits tell the stories of the internee transportation to Manzanar, the Owens Valley Paiute, the ranchers, the town of Manzanar, the role that water played in shaping the history of the Owens Valley, and one that plays a video of Ronald Reagan signing the Civil Liberties Act.

An "interpretive center" helps visitors gain an understanding of some of the internees' experiences. The exhibits in the center are constructed with materials that would have been used—or are similar to those used—when the camp was in operation. Details of camp experiences are from all ten of the relocation centers. A driving tour with 27 points of interest takes visitors around the site.

A mess hall, salvaged from a closing military facility, was added to the site in 2002. The replica guard tower was built in 2005. The Manzanar cemetery, where some of the internees who died at the camp were buried, also contains the memorial obelisk, which was built by masons in the camp in August 1943. All of the remains have been removed to other locations.

The site features original sentry posts at the camp entrance, a replica of a camp guard tower built in 2005, a self-guided tour road, and wayside exhibits. Staff offer guided tours and other educational programs, including a Junior Ranger educational program for children between four and fifteen years of age.

=== Reconstruction ===
Under most circumstances, the National Park Service discourages the reconstruction of structures and artifacts that are no longer extant, but allows for exceptions when "there is no alternative that would accomplish the park's interpretive mission, there is sufficient data to enable an accurate reconstruction," and "the reconstruction occurs on the original location." On the basis that these criteria were met, and after extensive discussion with the Japanese-American community, the NPS decided to proceed with a reconstruction of some elements of the original site alongside preservation of those remnants that survive.

The National Park Service is reconstructing one of the 36 residential blocks as a demonstration block (Block 14, adjacent to and west of the Visitor Center). One barrack appears as it would have when Japanese Americans first arrived at Manzanar in 1942, while another has been reconstructed to represent barracks life in 1945. Exhibits in these barracks opened on April 16, 2015. A restored World War II mess hall, moved to the site from Bishop Airport in 2002, was opened to visitors in late 2010. The Manzanar National Historic Site also unveiled its virtual museum on May 17, 2010.

National Park Service staff have continued to uncover artifacts from throughout Manzanar's history, the result of archaeological digs that have also excavated several of the gardens designed and built there, including the noted Merritt Park (also known as Pleasure Park). Recently completed is a classroom exhibit that is housed in the Block 9 barracks and an historic replica of the Block 9 women's latrine (opened in October 2016).

== Reception of and discussion regarding Manzanar ==
The Manzanar site had 1,275,195 people visit from 2000 through December 2016. The National Park Service's interpretation of events and experiences has been described as both "[willing] to memorialize a shameful, unconstitutional policy" and "providing a shortcut around the unjust suffering and often insurmountable adversity imposed by the internment". Congressman Mel Levine said the site should "serve as a reminder of the grievous errors and inhumane policies we pursued domestically during World War II and a reminder that we must never again allow such actions to occur in this country."

Academics have criticized those who initiated and implemented the WRA relocation policy and members of the JACL for supporting the WRA policies. They have also pointed out that the majority of accounts of the relocation published within the first few decades following the closure of the camps have been from the perspective of the WRA and the JACL.

Following President Trump's Executive Order 14253, and by order of Secretary of the Interior, Manzanar was one of the National Park Service sites to post a notice directing visitors to report "signs or other information that are negative about either past or living Americans or that fail to emphasize the beauty, grandeur, and abundance of landscapes and other natural features." In an interview for NBC News Dr. Nicholas Baham, professor of ethnic studies, was pessimistic about the feasibility of the Manzanar site avoiding such information.

=== Terminology ===
Since the end of World War II, there has been debate over the terminology used to refer to Manzanar and the other camps in which Americans of Japanese ancestry and their immigrant parents were incarcerated by the United States Government during the war. Manzanar has been referred to as a "War Relocation Authority center", "War Relocation Center", "relocation camp", "relocation center", "internment camp", "incarceration camp", "prison camp", and "concentration camp".

Prior to the opening of an exhibit about the American camps at Ellis Island, the American Jewish Committee (AJC) and the National Park Service, which manages Ellis Island, expressed concern regarding the use of the term "concentration camp" in the exhibit. At a meeting held at the offices of the AJC in New York City, leaders representing Japanese Americans and Jewish Americans reached an understanding about the use of the term, and the Japanese American National Museum and the AJC issued a joint statement:

A concentration camp is a place where people are imprisoned not because of any crimes they have committed, but simply because of who they are. Although many groups have been singled out for such persecution throughout history, the term 'concentration camp' was first used at the turn of the [20th] century in the Spanish American and Boer Wars. During World War II, America's concentration camps were clearly distinguishable from Nazi Germany's. Nazi camps were places of torture, barbarous medical experiments and summary executions; some were extermination centers with gas chambers.

== In popular culture ==
=== Films and television ===
A made-for-television movie, Farewell to Manzanar, aired on NBC in 1976. It was based on the 1973 memoir of the same name, written by Jeanne Wakatsuki Houston, who was incarcerated at Manzanar as a child, and her husband James D. Houston. In 2011, the Japanese American National Museum (JANM) announced that they had negotiated the rights to the movie, and that they would make it available for purchase on DVD.

The 1990 feature film Come See the Paradise detailed the forced removal and incarceration at Manzanar of a Japanese American family from Los Angeles.

In the 1984 film The Karate Kid, Mr. Miyagi opens up to his student Daniel about the dual loss of his wife and son in childbirth at the Manzanar internment camp; the actor who played Mr. Miyagi, Pat Morita, was interned for two years at Manzanar with his parents.

In Die Hard, Hans Gruber says that Joseph Takagi was interned in Manzanar from 1942 to 1943.

In the Cold Case episode "Family 8108," (s5e11) the team reopens the 1945 murder of Ray Takahashi, a Japanese-American father killed in Philadelphia shortly after his family was released from the Manzanar internment camp. A lot of scenes are set in Manzanar.

The short film, A Song for Manzanar, depicts the true story of a detainee and her struggle to remain hopeful for her son and stay in contact with her family in Hiroshima.

In "Baku", the 2018 season three episode of The Man in the High Castle TV series, Frank Frink is executed for his resistance against the Japanese occupation by Kenpeitai inspector Kido on the site of the former camp.

=== Music ===
Folk/country musician Tom Russell wrote "Manzanar", a song about the Japanese American incarceration, that was released on his album Box of Visions (1993). Laurie Lewis covered the song on her album Seeing Things (1998), adding the koto to her performance. The Asian American jazz fusion band Hiroshima has a song entitled "Manzanar", inspired by the incarceration, on its album The Bridge (2003). Hiroshima's song "Living in America", on its album titled East (1990), contains the phrase "I still remember Manzanar". Fort Minor's song "Kenji", from the album The Rising Tied (2005), tells the true story of Mike Shinoda's family including their experiences during their internment at Manzanar. The band Channel 3 recorded a song titled "Manzanar" about the incarceration. The band Cock Robin included a song titled "Manzanar" on their album First Love / Last Rites (1990).

American composer Steve Heitzeg's work "Green Hope After Black Rain (Symphony for the Survivors of Hiroshima, Nagasaki and the Manzanar Concentration Camp)" is a memorial to the victims of the 1945 atomic bombings of the two Japanese cities as well as the Manzanar camp. It includes percussion elements made from Hiroshima and Nagasaki trees as well as stones from Manzanar. It was premiered in 2022 by the Saint Paul Civic Symphony in Minnesota.

=== Literature ===
The 1994 novel Snow Falling on Cedars by David Guterson contains scenes and details relating to Japanese Americans from the state of Washington and their incarceration experiences at Manzanar. A 1999 film of the same name was based on the book. Paper Wishes, a book published in 2016 by Lois Sepahban is a book about a girl named Manami who goes to Manzanar with her family and loses her dog Yujiin, on the way.

== See also ==
- Bibliography of the Japanese American Internment during World War II
- Outline of Japanese American Internment during World War II
- California during World War II
