= New Mexico during World War II =

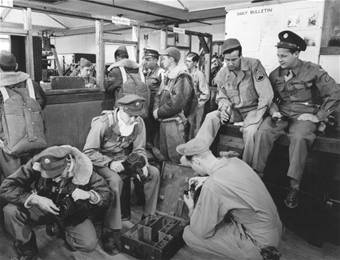
- Enlisted men drawing cameras to go up in a Beechcraft AT-11 on bomb-spotting missions at Roswell Army Flying School.
- Population: 531,818 (1940)
- Date: 1941–1945
- Casualties: ~2,349
- Events: Lordsburg Killings – July 27, 1942; Escape from Fort Stanton – November 1–3, 1942; Bat Bomb Incident – May 15, 1943; Santa Fe Riot – March 12, 1945; Trinity explosion – July 16, 1945

The history of New Mexico during World War II is characterized by dramatic and lasting changes to its economy, society, and politics. The state played a central role in the American war effort, contributing a disproportionately high number of servicemen and natural resources; most famously, it hosted the sites where the world's first nuclear weapon was designed, developed, and tested.

When the United States entered World War II in December 1941, New Mexico had been a state for only three decades and was largely marginal in national affairs. Its sparse population, remoteness, and geography proved ideally suited for top secret military bases and scientific laboratories—most notably at Los Alamos, which undertook the advanced nuclear research that led to the atomic bomb. New Mexico also hosted a variety of military installations, from training facilities to army hospitals, as well as several camps for prisoners of war and Japanese American internees.

New Mexicans were among the first Americans to see combat in the war, with over 1,800 fighting Japan's invasion of the Philippines just hours after its attack on Pearl Harbor. Patriotism ran high throughout the state's diverse and disparate populace, including among its long-marginalized Hispanic and indigenous communities; among them were several of the famed Navajo code talkers, who were critical to protecting U.S. wartime communications. New Mexico would provide more military volunteers, and suffer more casualties, than any other state.

World War II had an immediate and enduring transformative effect on New Mexico. Government investment precipitated an unprecedented economic and demographic boom, with the state's pre-war population of 530,000 nearly doubling to 950,000 by 1960. New Mexico's largely agrarian prewar economy became more industrialized, and its mostly rural population became increasingly urban. Many of the military and scientific installations built during the war remain active and strategically valuable to this day; the wartime development of modern military technology fostered a unique and continuing relationship between New Mexico, the federal government, and the scientific community.

== Military personnel ==
The United States participated in the Second World War from December 1941 to August 1945. During that time, 49,579 New Mexicans volunteered or were drafted into military service, accounting for roughly 9 percent of the total population—the highest rate of service among all forty-eight states at the time. New Mexico also endured the highest proportion of fatalities among U.S. states, losing over 2,200 citizens by the war's end.

=== Bataan Death March ===
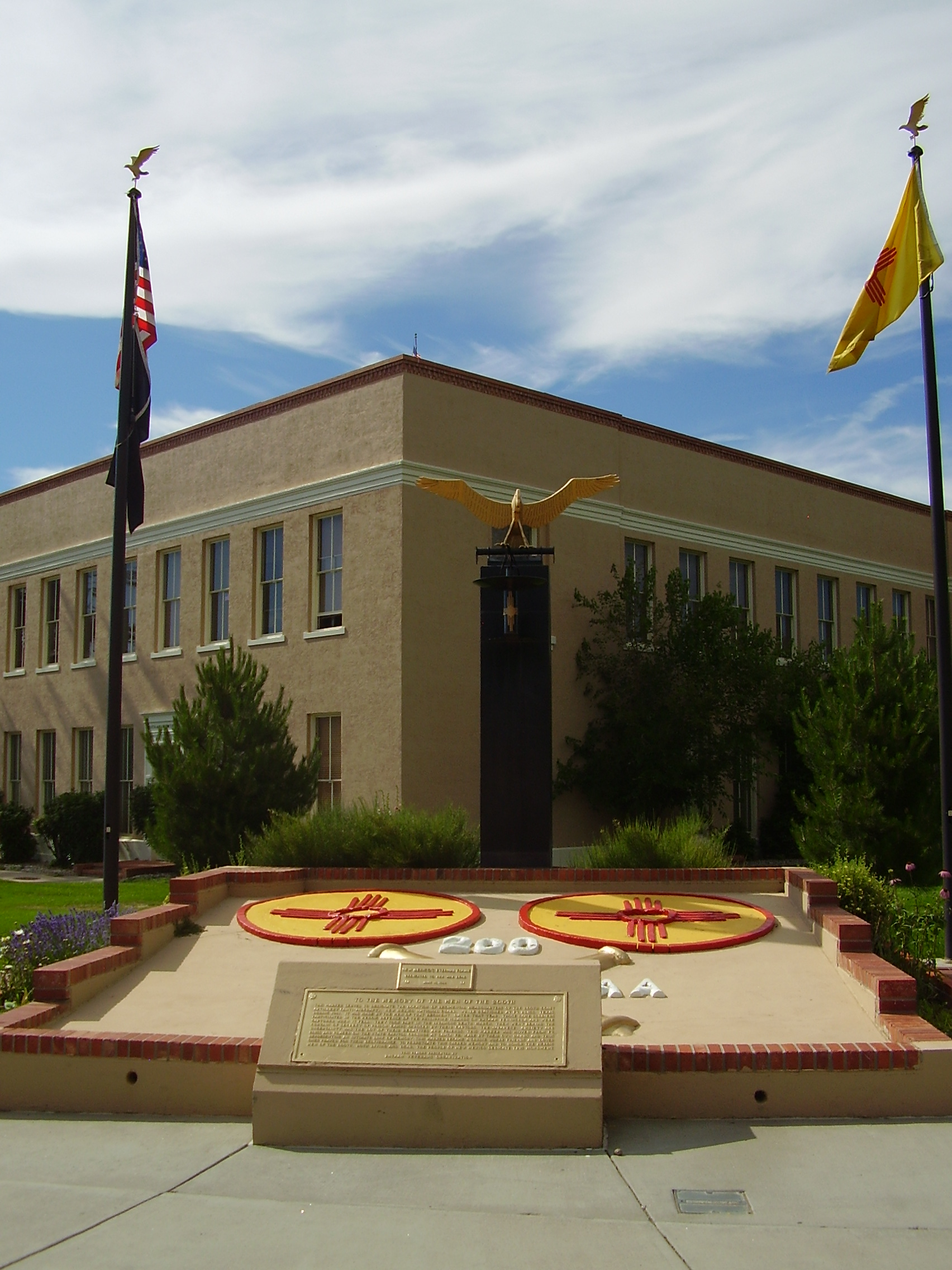
Memorial to the 200th Coast Artillery of the New Mexico National Guard in Santa Fe, New Mexico.

Soldiers from New Mexico were among the first Americans to fight in the war. On January 3, 1941, the 200th Coast Artillery of the New Mexico National Guard had been mobilized for one year's service with the United States Army, arriving in the Philippines in September, where they manned anti-aircraft guns at Clark Field and Fort Stotsenburg. The regiment had a storied history, tracing its origins to the famous New Mexican Cavalry that was deployed to Cuba to fight with Teddy Roosevelt’s "Rough Riders" in the Spanish-American War. When New Mexico became a state less than fourteen years later, in 1912, the cavalry force was federalized and the 200th became one of the most ethnically diverse National Guard battalions in the United States.

The regiment saw action just ten hours after the December 8th attack on Pearl Harbor, Hawaii, when Japanese aircraft led the coming invasion of the Philippines. Although their shells could not hit high-flying Japanese bombers, the New Mexicans managed to strike lower altitude fighters, downing eighty-six aircraft, including six in a single day. After the Japanese launched their main offensive to conquer the Philippines on January 7, 1942, the 200th Coast Artillery, along with the newly formed 515th Coast Artillery of New Mexico, covered the withdrawal of Filipino and American forces during the Battle of Bataan.

Despite the overwhelming odds working against them, the "New Mexico Brigade" and other defenders continued putting up dogged resistance, surprising Japanese forces, who had expected to capture the Philippines sooner. However, amid mounting casualties, dwindling ammunition and supplies, and worsening health conditions, American and Filipino surrendered on April 9, 1942; nineteen New Mexicans were killed after nearly four months of fighting. The survivors joined other captured troops in the infamous Bataan Death March that followed, in which thousands of Allied prisoners of war died during an arduous march from the battlefield to camps at Balanga; thousands died during the nearly two-week trek, due to thirst, hunger, exhaustion, disease, and mistreatment by Japanese troops, including torture and executions. The majority of New Mexicans and their fellow POWs remained in Japanese captivity until the end of the war, with many perishing in camps throughout the Philippines as well as in hell ships that transported them in inhumane conditions across the Japanese Empire to serve as forced labor.

On December 8, 1941, when the Japanese unexpectedly attacked the Philippine Islands, the first point bombed was Ft. Stotsenberg. The 200th Coast Artillery, assigned to defend the Fort, was the first unit, under The General of the Army Douglas MacArthur, to go into action defending our flag in the Pacific. First to fire, and last to lay down their arms! A fitting epitaph for a valiant Brigade which fought standing firmly in its appointed place and facing forward to the enemy. — U.S. Army General Jonathan Mayhew Wainwright IV

Of the 1,825 New Mexican troops serving in the Philippines, fewer than half, approximately 800 to 900, returned home; of these survivors, an estimated one-third died within a year, most likely due to health complications from their harsh captivity. The infamy of the Bataan Death March, and its accounting for half New Mexico's war dead, has led to it being heavily memorialized in the state. Monuments and statues dedicated to Bataan are found in most major cities and towns, including Taos, Las Cruces, Roswell, and Deming, where a disproportionate number of residents served with the 200th Coast Artillery; the largest commemorative site is Bataan Memorial Park in Albuquerque, which bears inscriptions of the names of all those who served in the Philippines. Several streets, plazas, and government buildings are named after the event, including the Bataan Memorial Building in Santa Fe, which was once the state capitol and today hosts several state agencies.

=== Navajo code talkers ===
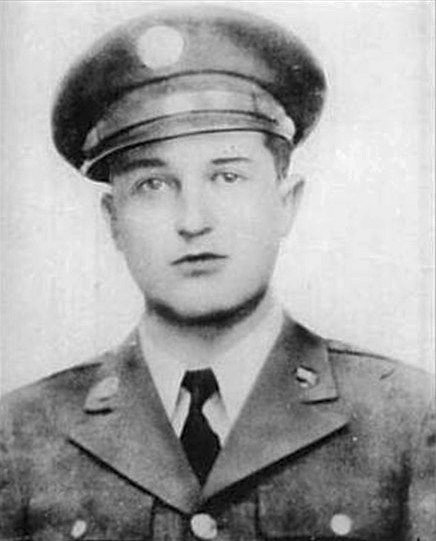
U.S. Army Private Joe P. Martinez of Taos, New Mexico, was posthumously awarded the Medal of Honor for heroic actions during the Aleutian Islands Campaign.

Many of the famed Navajo code talkers of the Second World War came from New Mexico. Seeking a way to protect communications from Japanese intelligence, the Marine Corps raised several outfits of Navajo radiomen who could use their native language as a code on the battlefield. The first group, which consisted of twenty-nine men, was recruited by Philip Johnston, a World War I veteran who was fluent in the Navajo language. Johnston and the "original twenty-nine," as they were known, are credited with developing the code, though it was modified and improved by others as the war progressed. At least 540 Navajos served in the Marine Corps during World War II, about 400 of whom were trained as code talkers. Because many of them lacked birth certificates, it was impossible to verify the age of some recruits; after the war, it was revealed that boys as young as fifteen had enlisted. Navajo code talkers fought in every major campaign of the Pacific Theater between 1942 and 1945, from Guadalcanal to Okinawa. They are credited with saving countless lives and hastening the war's end with their simple transmissions; their code was never broken and continued to be used by American forces during the Korean War and at the beginning of the Vietnam War.

=== Medal of Honor recipients ===
Eight New Mexicans—five native-born and three who had moved to the state—were awarded the U.S. Armed Forces' highest military decoration, the Medal of Honor, for distinguished acts of valor during World War II. Of these recipients, five were posthumously recognized; they include Joe P. Martínez of Taos, the first Hispanic American recipient, for actions in the Aleutian Islands Campaign; Harold Herman Moon, Jr. of Albuquerque, for actions during the Battle of Leyte in the Philippines; and Jose F. Valdez of Gobernador, for actions in German-occupied France.

== Military installations ==
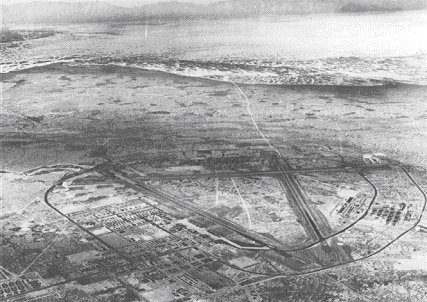
Alamogordo Army Airfield in 1944.

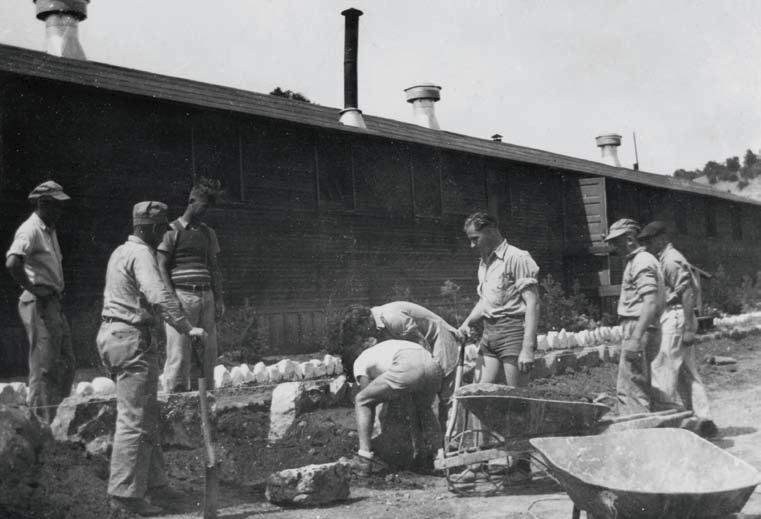
German internees working in their garden at Fort Stanton.

Several military installations were built in New Mexico just after the war began, including airbases, training facilities, prisoner of war camps and internment camps. Among the most prominent of the new bases was Kirtland Field, in Albuquerque. Kirtland was originally an advanced flight school for Air Corps pilots, but it was converted into a major base shortly after the attack on Pearl Harbor. By the end of the war, 1,750 B-24 crewmen had trained there, as well as B-29 pilots, AT-11 pilots, glider pilots, aviation mechanics, navigators, and others. In May 1942, the army built the Albuquerque Air Depot Training Station just east of Kirtland to specialize in training in aircraft service, repair, and maintenance; however, shortly thereafter, it was transformed into an airbase and used as a convalescence station for wounded soldiers returning from battle. In 1945, the facility was renamed Sandia Army Airfield and eventually merged with Kirtland. Other major bases were located at Clovis, Alamogordo, and Roswell, along with temporary war-time airfields at Hobbs, Deming, Fort Sumner, and the White Sands Proving Ground.

The prisoner of war and internment camps in New Mexico were among the largest in the United States during World War II. Most prisoners were Germans who had been captured during the North Africa Campaign, although there were some Italian soldiers. Among the most notable sites were Camp Roswell, located next to Walker Army Airfield, which housed 4,800 Germans and Italians; Camp Lordsburg, near the town of Lordsburg, which had Germans, Italians, and some 600 Japanese internees; and Camp Santa Fe, near the state's capital city of Santa Fe, which held 1,900 Japanese internees.

Life at the camps was mostly peaceful and unexciting, however, there was an incident in 1942 involving the shooting deaths of two Japanese internees at Camp Lordsburg, and a "small riot" at Camp Santa Fe in 1945. There was also at least one notable escape attempt. Four sailors, who had been captured aboard the SS Columbus in 1939, slipped out of the German internment camp at Fort Stanton on the night of November 1, 1942. Heading south towards the border with Mexico, the Germans made only fourteen miles before being recaptured by a posse of locals after a brief firefight inside the Lincoln National Forest.

Military installations	Total
Major Airbases	8
Dispersal Bases	5
Bombing & Gunnery Ranges	13
Army Hospitals	4
Camps	2
National Cemeteries	3
POW Camps	3
Branch POW Camps	19
National Guard Armories	11
Colleges & Universities	7
Specialized Military Locations	7

== Scientific research ==
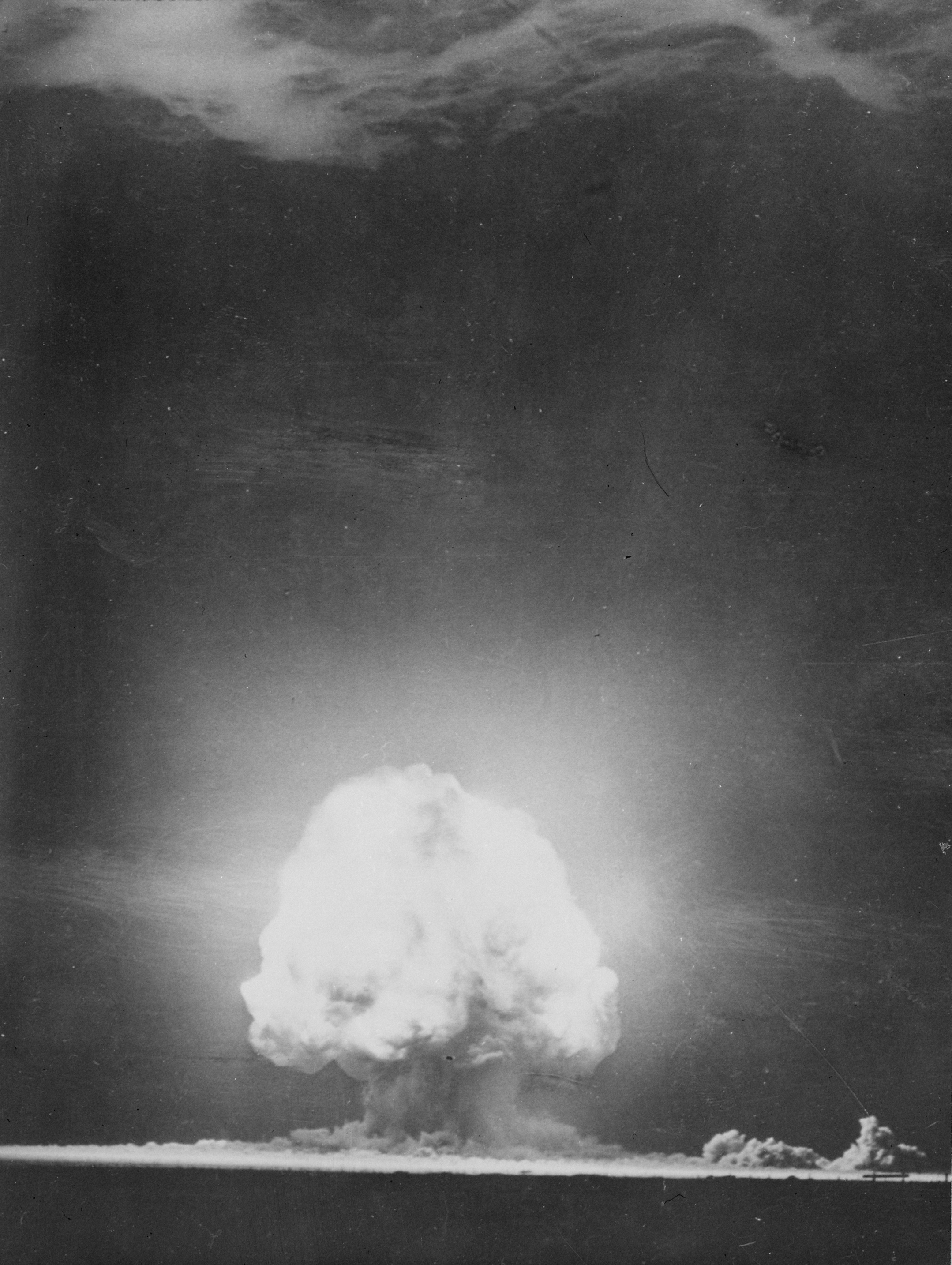
The Trinity explosion, which occurred in New Mexico on July 16, 1945, at what is now White Sands Proving Ground, marked the beginning of the Atomic Age.

New Mexico became a center for advanced, top secret military technology during the war. Several important technological breakthroughs occurred within the state, of which the most famous and decisive was the atomic bombing. Another a major innovation was the proximity fuse, a type of fuse attached to artillery shells that could trigger an explode within the proximity of a target, rather than on impact. Testing of proximity fused anti-aircraft shells was carried out from Kirtland Field as early as 1943; on a desert mesa nearby, the army suspended aircraft with "the tallest wooden towers in the world" to fire the shells at them. The fuses proved pivotal in the Pacific Theater, where they were used with devastating effect against Japanese aircraft, and in the Ardennes campaign against Germany during the 1944 Siege of Bastogne.

=== Manhattan Project ===
The most important of all the secret weapons programs in New Mexico was the Manhattan Project, the codename for the nuclear weapons experiments taking place across the United States, Canada, and Britain. It began in 1942 after physicist J. Robert Oppenheimer assembled "the greatest concentration of scientific resources and brainpower in history" to build the world's first atomic bomb. Based on Oppenheimer's proposal for a dedicated bomb laboratory, in 1943 the U.S. government ordered the army to construct the giant Los Alamos National Laboratory in a remote location twenty miles northwest of Santa Fe, then sealed off the entire area to keep it secret. Then known as Project Y, the site was selected for its combination of isolation, relative accessibility, and natural beauty.

By the end of the war in 1945, some 5,000 people lived at Los Alamos, which led to the founding of the present-day town. The eponymous lab remains a federal facility, serving as one of the largest scientific institutions in the world.

== Economy ==
Despite its reputation as an arid desert, New Mexico's pre-war economy was largely agrarian, centered mainly on cattle ranching and subsistence-level farming. Despite having been heavily weakened by the Great Depression, the state managed to revitalize its farming industry and grow a wide variety of crops for the war effort; among the main agricultural products were carrots, pinto beans, cotton (which was critical for uniforms), beef, and lamb. Like other western states, New Mexico was a major recipient of Mexican laborers imported into the U.S. through the Bracero Program with Mexico.

New Mexico had long been known for its abundant natural resources, ranging from petroleum to various metals. At the time the U.S. entered World War II, the state had already experienced increased production of copper, lead, zinc, molybdenum, and manganese. The highly mechanized U.S. military was heavily reliant on all types of metals as well as fossil fuels; like many states, New Mexico saw unprecedented investment in its mining and extraction industries, ultimately becoming one of the leading contributors of strategic resources. During the war, the state ranked first in the production of potash (a key ingredient in explosives), tantalum (a major component in electronics and alloys), and pumice (for use in construction); second in zinc and tin; third in copper, molybdenum, and vanadium; fourth in beryl, lithium, and fluorspar; and seventh in oil and gas. In terms of the overall value of minerals produced, New Mexico ranked fourteenth among U.S. states.

== Casualties ==
Roughly four percent of New Mexicans who served in the war were killed or missing—the highest rate of casualties of any state. Approximately half of all deaths were attributed to the Bataan Death March and the captivity that followed, in which POWs were subject to inhumane treatment, malnourishment, torture, and summary execution.

=== Army and Air Forces ===
County	Killed in Action (KIA)	Died of Wounds (DOW)	Died of Injuries (DOI)	Died, Non-Battle (DNB)	Finding of Death (FOD)	Missing in Action (MIA)	Total
Bernalillo	160	12	1	163	17	1	354
Catron	6	2		4		2	14
Chaves	58	4		23	7	1	93
Colfax	27	4		25	5		61
Curry	29	5		43	5	2	84
De Baca	7	3		7	1		18
Doña Ana	53	3	1	28	12	1	98
Eddy	54	6		53	3		116
Grant	55	5		43	3	2	108
Guadalupe	15	4		10			29
Harding	8	2		3			13
Hidalgo	9	1		4			14
Lea	27	5		29	4		65
Lincoln	21			12	1		34
Luna	26	4	1	21	5	1	58
McKinley	51	6		41	5		103
Mora	29	3		9			41
Otero	19	1		15	2		37
Quay	12	4		7	1		24
Rio Arriba	32	1		20	7		60
Roosevelt	22	3		17	3		45
Sandoval	21	4		15		1	41
San Juan	22	6		14	3		45
San Miguel	42	5		22	2		71
Santa Fe	59	6		47	5		117
Sierra	14	1		7	3		25
Socorro	23	4		9			36
Taos	36	6		26	1		69
Torrance	17	4		10	2		33
Union	16	1		10	4		31
Valencia	46	5		31			82
State at Large	7			3	2	1	13
Total	1,023	120	3	771	105	10	2032

=== Navy, Marine Corps, and Coast Guard ===
Over half the New Mexicans who served in the maritime forces—the U.S. Navy, Marine Corps, and Coast Guard—were killed in action. Among these fatalities were twenty-four of the eighty-four sailors who died with the sinking of the submarine USS Bullhead, which most likely occurred the same day an atomic bomb was dropped on Hiroshima; it was the last U.S. naval vessel lost to enemy action during World War II. The event is commemorated through Bullhead Memorial Park in Albuquerque, a 44-acre park that includes a memorial featuring three inert World War II-era torpedoes and two plaques bearing the names of the men who died aboard.

Type	Total
Killed in Action (KIA)	219
Killed in Prison Camps	5
Missing in Action (MIA)	7
Wounded in Action (WIA)	330
Released from Prison Camps	19
Total	580

== Gallery ==
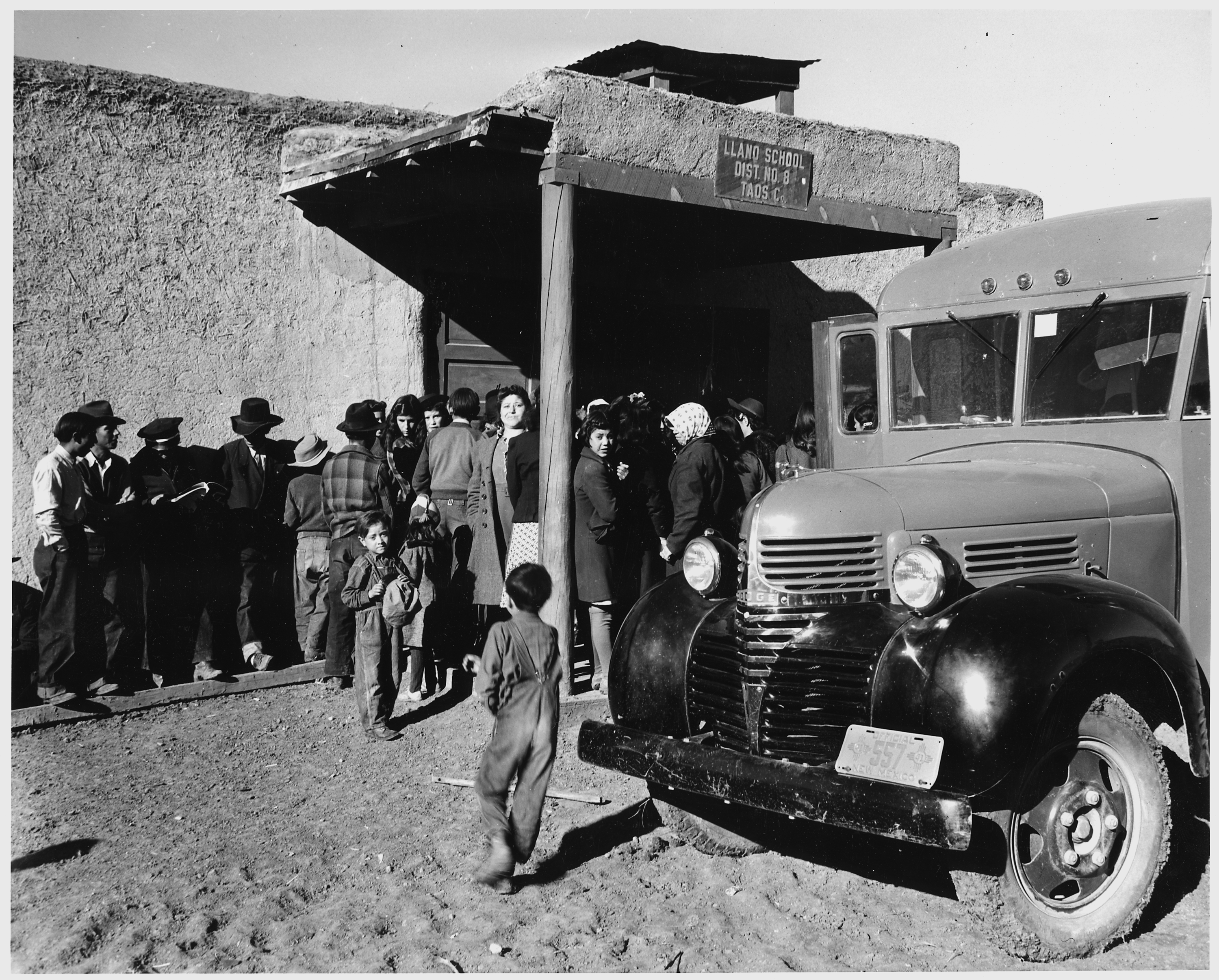
Project Bookmobile visiting the school at Llano San Juan to circulate books, show educational films, and sell defense stamps, in December 1941.

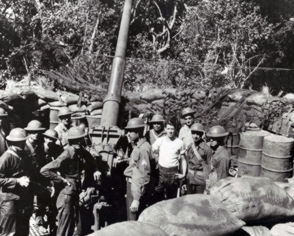
Members of the 200th Coast Artillery during the Philippines Campaign in 1942.

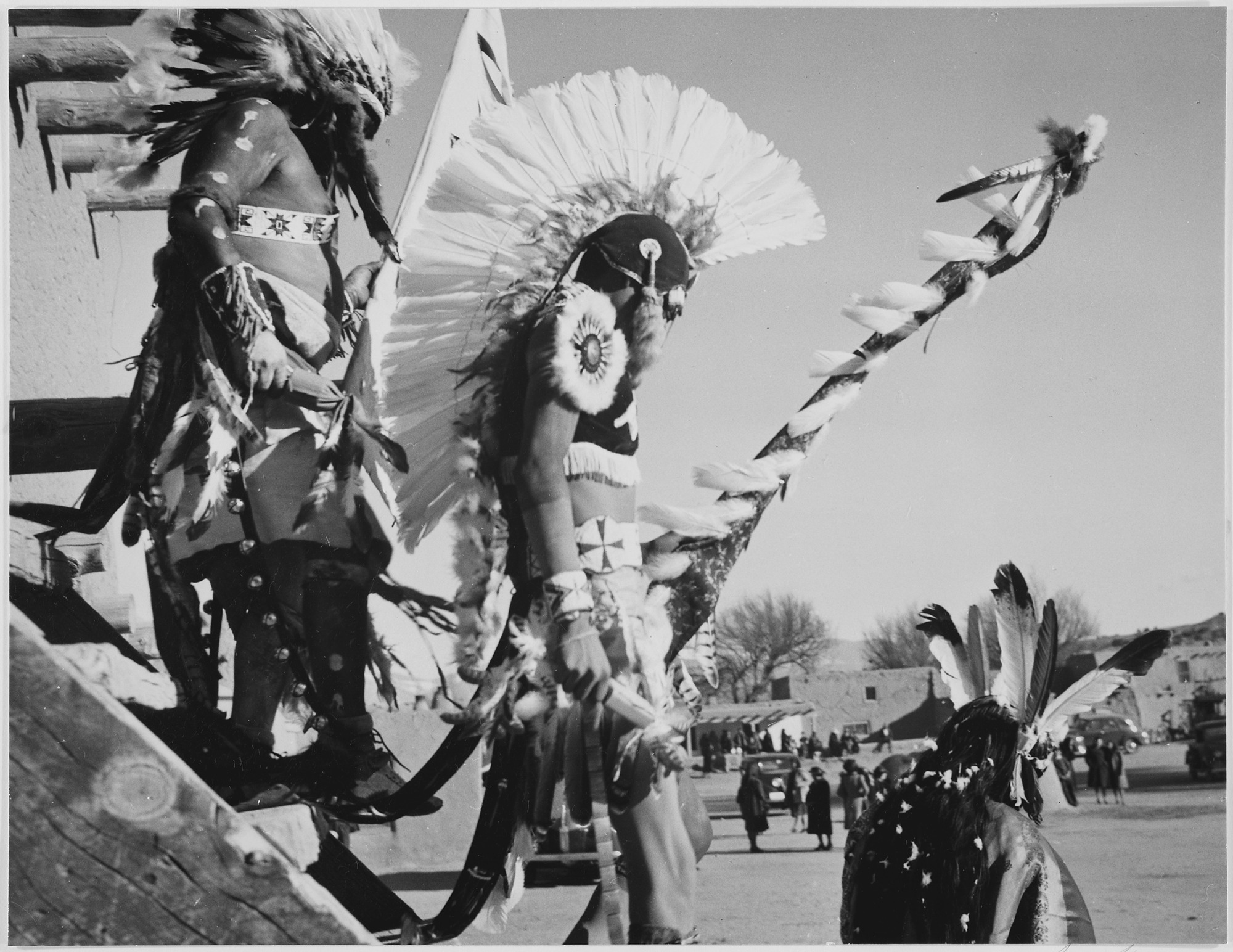
Three Pueblo Indians watching tourists at San Ildefonso Pueblo, New Mexico. Photograph taken by Ansel Adams in 1942.

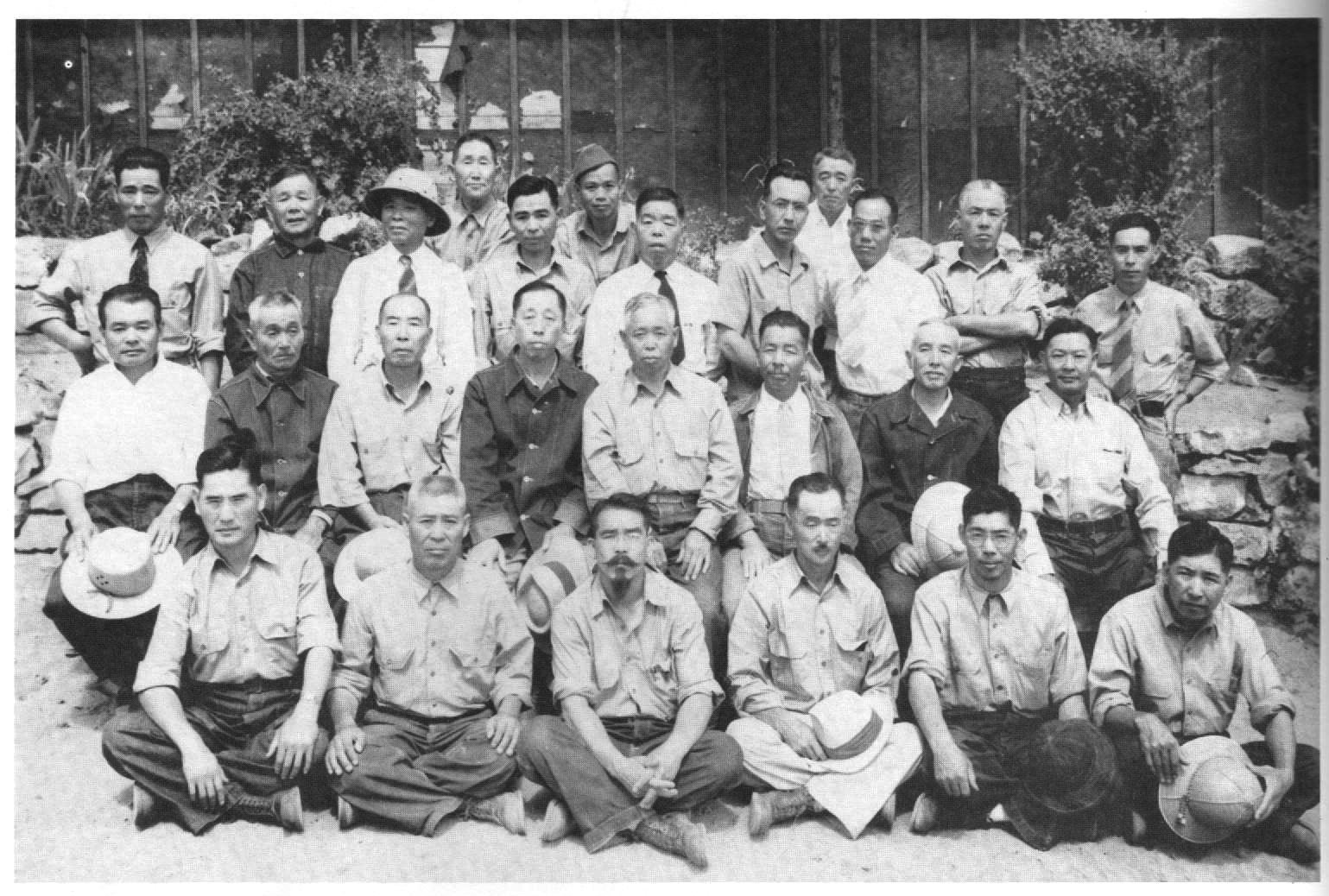
Japanese internees at Camp Lordsburg sometime between 1942 and 1943.

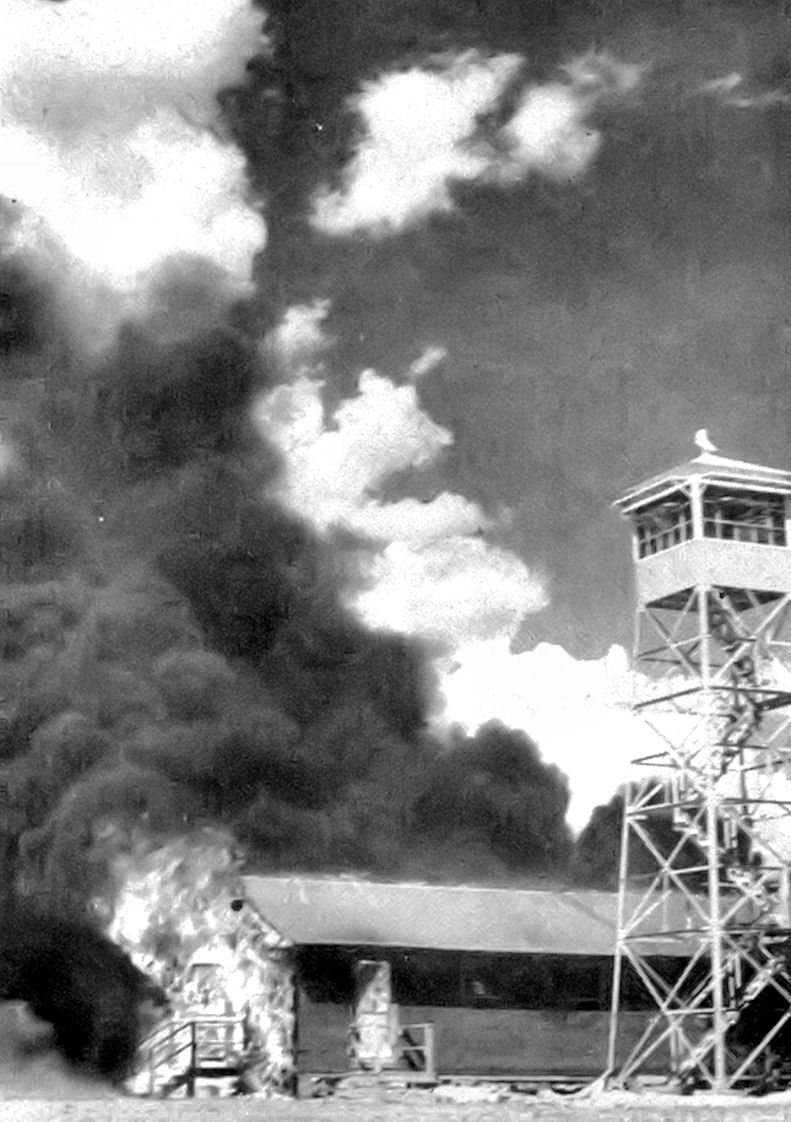
A fire at the Carlsbad Army Airfield during the Bat Bomb Incident in 1943.

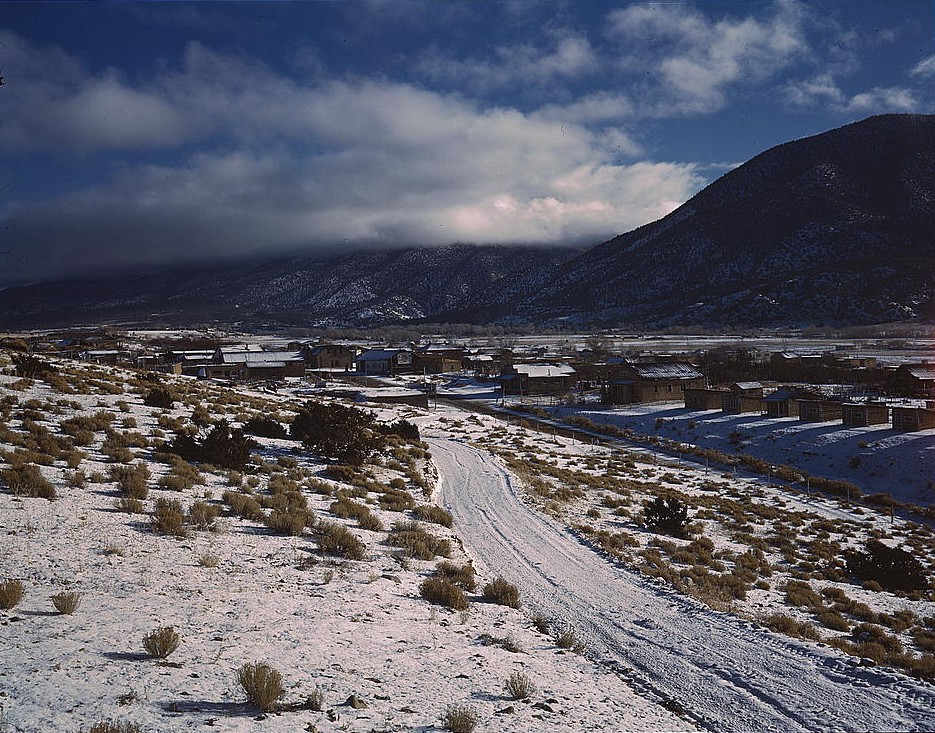
Questa, New Mexico in 1943.

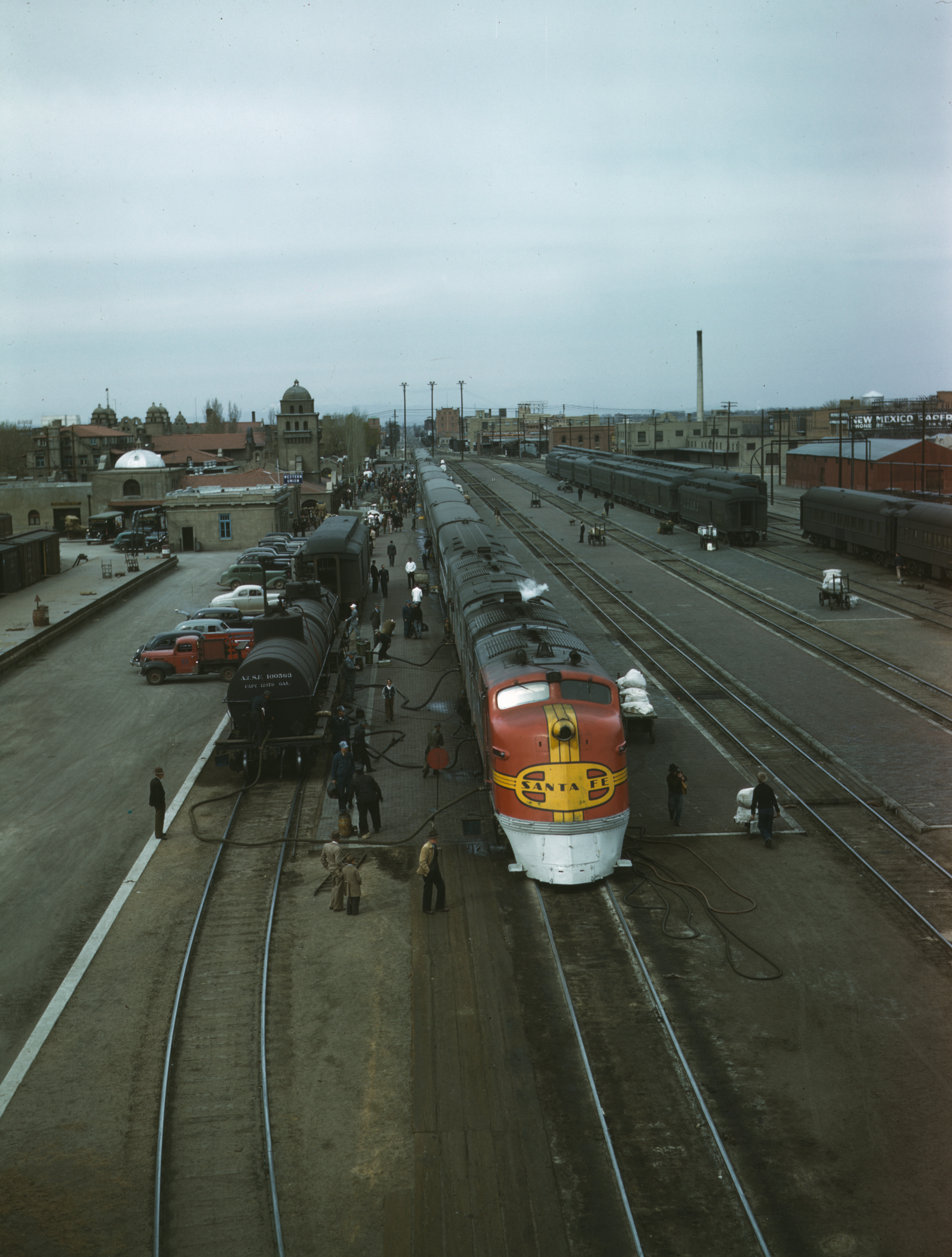
A Santa Fe Railroad streamliner, the "Super Chief," being serviced at the depot in Albuquerque in March 1943.

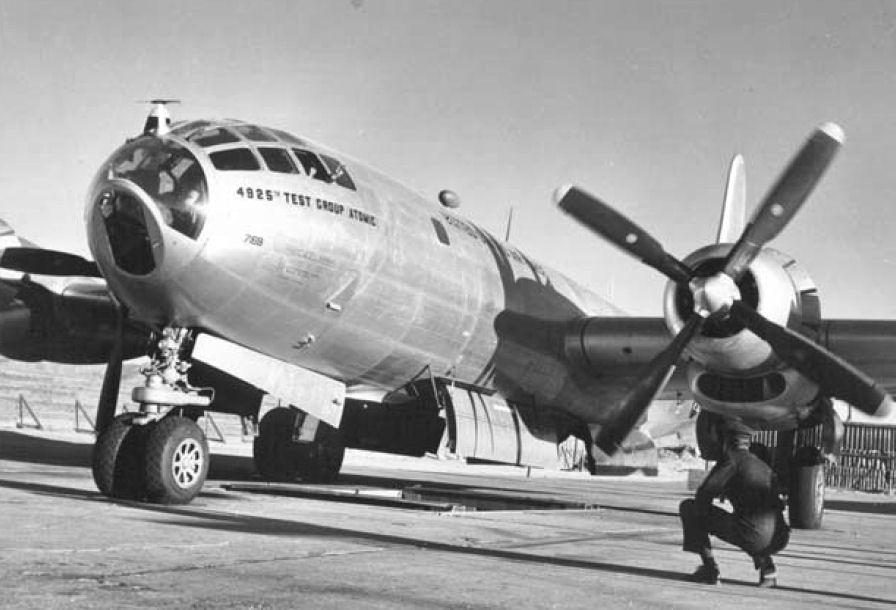
A Boeing B-29 Superfortress at Kirtland Field in 1945.

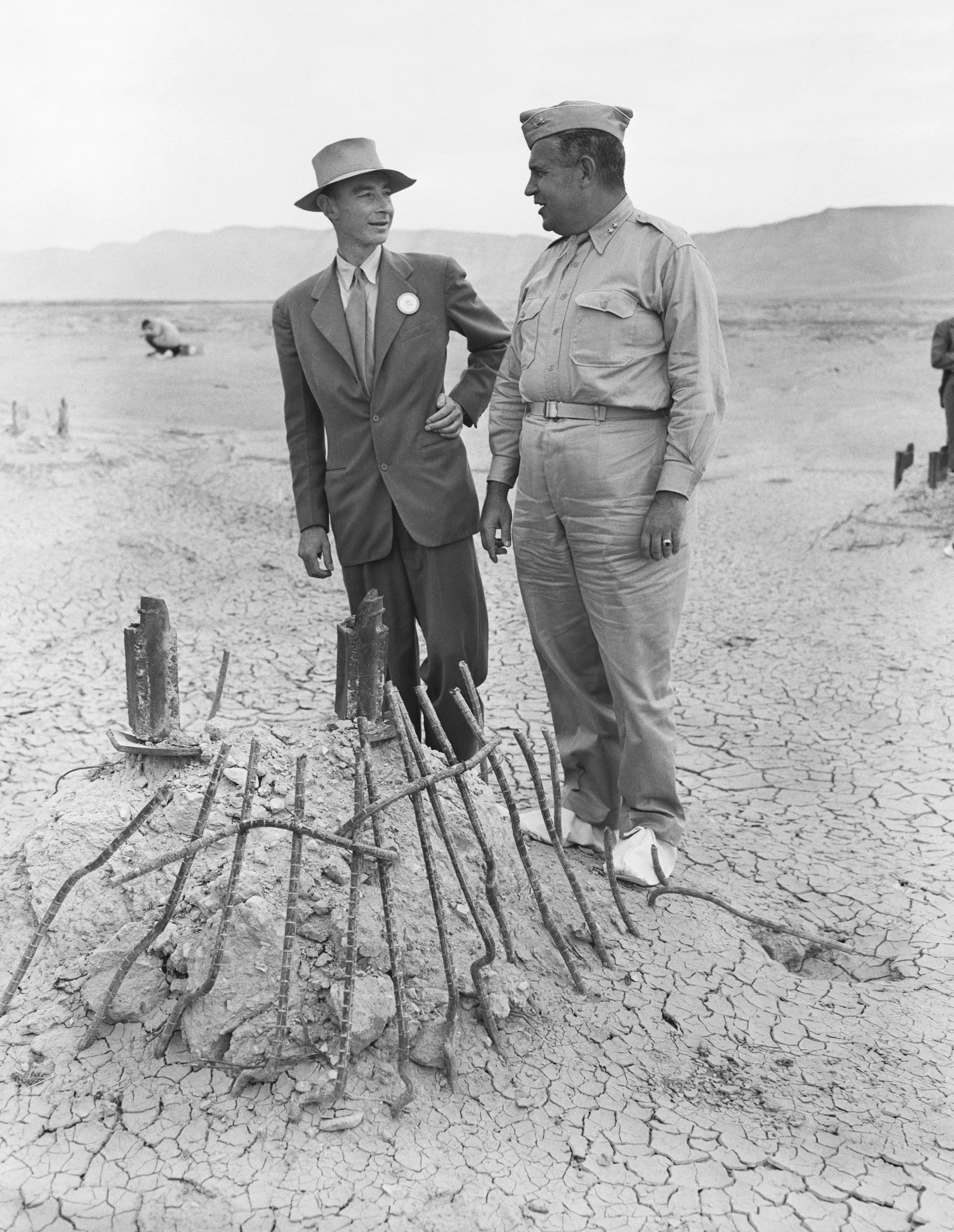
General Leslie Groves and J. Robert Oppenheimer at the site of the Trinity explosion in September 1945.

== See also ==
- American Theater (1939–1945)
- Arizona during World War II
- Battle of Columbus (1916)
- Military history of the United States during World War II
- Nevada during World War II
- United States home front during World War II
