= Fort Lincoln Internment Camp =

Former military post in North Dakota, US

Coordinates: 46°46′20″N 100°45′52″W

Fort Lincoln Internment Camp was a military post and internment camp located south of Bismarck, North Dakota, USA, on the east side of the Missouri River.

It was first established as a military post in 1895 to replace Fort Yates, following the closure of the original Fort Abraham Lincoln on the west side of the Missouri River in 1891. During the interwar period, it was a training site for units of the Seventh Corps Area.

In April 1941, it was converted into an internment camp for enemy aliens (German and Italian seamen who were captured in U.S. waters, despite the U.S. technically remaining neutral at that time). 800 Italian seamen arrived when the camp opened in April but were soon after transferred to Fort Missoula, Montana. 280 German seamen arrived in May to replace them.

After the outbreak of World War II, it was turned over to the Department of Justice and expanded to make room for U.S. civilians of Japanese and German descent (mostly non-citizen residents who were arrested on suspicion of fifth column activity, despite a lack of supporting evidence or access to due process). The Japanese American internees were relocated to other camps shortly after their arrival in 1942, leaving Fort Lincoln with a population of German prisoners of war and German American internees until February 1945. On February 14, 650 Japanese Americans were transferred to Fort Lincoln from the DOJ camp at Santa Fe, New Mexico and the War Relocation Authority camp at Tule Lake, which had become a segregation center for "disloyal" inmates in 1943. These new arrivals were either Nisei who, fed up with the government's incarceration policy and, in some cases, coerced by camp authorities or groups of pro-Japan inmates, had renounced their U.S. citizenship, or non-citizen Issei who had, again under significant duress, requested repatriation to Japan. Another 100 "renunciants" arrived in July. Over half of these men were deported to Japan later in 1945. Some 3,600 prisoners passed through Fort Lincoln during the war, with a peak population of 1,518 in February 1942.

After the war, Fort Lincoln was closed. The land is now the site of United Tribes Technical College. The "Snow Country Prison" memorial, dedicated on September 5, 2025, honors Japanese American internees.

== See also ==
- Japanese American internment
- Lordsburg Killings
