= United Tribes Technical College =

Tribal land-grant college in Bismarck, North Dakota, U.S.

Coordinates: 46.768616°N 100.763039°W

- Type: Private tribal land-grant community college
- Established: 1969; 57 years ago
- President: Leander McDonald
- Students: 885 students, 635 full-time undergraduates, and 250 part-time undergraduates
- Location: Bismarck, North Dakota, United States
- Campus: urban/suburban
- Nickname: T-Birds
- Website: www.uttc.edu

United Tribes Technical College (UTTC) is a private tribal land-grant community college in Bismarck, North Dakota. In 2012, UTTC had an enrollment 885 students, 635 full-time undergraduates, and 250 part-time undergraduates.

== History ==
The UTTC was founded in 1969 by an association of North Dakota's native tribes. The United Tribes of North Dakota Development Corporation chartered UTTC in Bismarck, North Dakota in 1969. The UTTC applied for, and was granted candidacy for accreditation status by the North Central Association in 1978. The UTTC received full membership in NCA as a vocational technical school in spring 1982. In 1987, the UTTC received authority from NCA to offer its first associate degree program. In 1994, the college was designated a land-grant college alongside 31 other tribal colleges.

In 2003, the UTTC became the first Tribal College to receive accreditation for online programs offering associate of applied sciences degree programs.

The land where UTTC stands was once Fort Lincoln Internment Camp, a World War II-era relocation site. The "Snow Country Prison" memorial recognizing the internment of Japanese Americans was dedicated on September 5, 2025. German American civilians were also imprisoned at the camp.

== Governance ==
The UTTC is owned and operated by and serves the five Tribal Nations located entirely or in-part of North Dakota:

- Sisseton-Wahpeton Oyate,
- Spirit Lake Nation,
- Standing Rock Sioux Tribe,
- Three Affiliated Tribes (Mandan, Hidatsa, and Arikara Nation) of the Fort Berthold Reservation, and
- Turtle Mountain Band of Chippewa.

== Academics ==
The UTTC offers certificate programs, two-year degrees and four-year degrees in over 20 programs of study.

== Demographic Data ==
Undergraduate demographics as of Fall 2023
Race and ethnicity	Total
American Indian/Alaska Native	96%
White	2%
Black	1%
Two or more races	1%
Economic diversity
Low-income (Note: The percentage of students who received an income-based federal Pell grant intended for low-income students.)	75%
Affluent (Note: The percentage of students who are a part of the American middle class at the bare minimum.)	25%

== Partnerships ==
UTTC is a member of the American Indian Higher Education Consortium (AIHEC), which is a community of tribally and federally chartered institutions working to strengthen tribal nations and make a lasting difference in the lives of American Indians and Alaska Natives. UTTC was created in response to the higher education needs of American Indians. UTTC generally serves geographically isolated populations that have no other means accessing education beyond the high school level.
