= Escape from Fort Stanton =

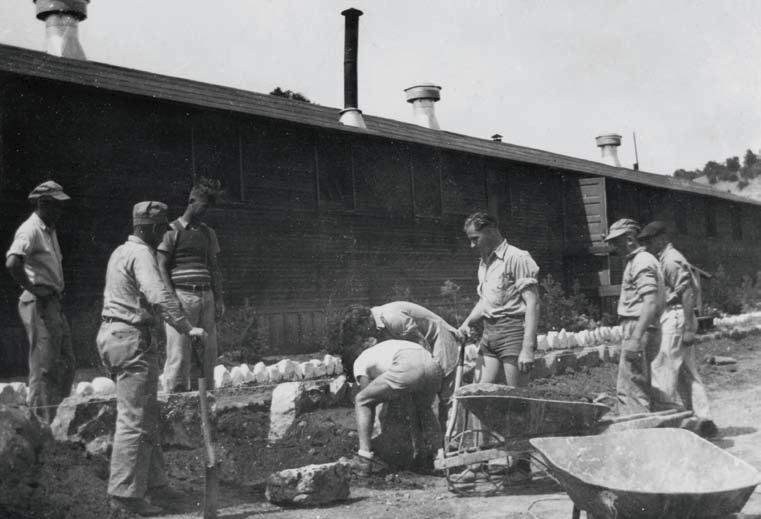
- German internees working in their garden at Fort Stanton.
- Date: November 1–3, 1942
- Location: Fort Stanton, New Mexico, United States
- Outcome: 1 wounded

The Escape from Fort Stanton occurred on November 1, 1942, when four German sailors escaped from an internment camp at Fort Stanton, New Mexico. There were other minor escape attempts from the fort, but the incident in November 1942 was the most successful and the only one to end with a shootout. One German was wounded as a result and the three remaining prisoners were sent back to Fort Stanton.

== Background ==
Fort Stanton, located about seven miles northeast of Capitan, was an old United States Army post from the Wild West days, but when World War II began, a camp was built at the site for German and Japanese internees. Most of the German prisoners, including the four involved in the escape, were crew members of the SS Columbus, a luxury liner that was sunk by her own crew 400 miles off the coast of Virginia, United States, on December 19, 1939. The camp at Fort Stanton was originally built specifically for the crew of Columbus, which amounted to over 400 men. It was also the first American internment camp for civilians opened during the war. The guards were United States Border Patrol members rather than the army. Fort Stanton was chosen because there were abandoned buildings from the Civilian Conservation Corps adjacent to the fort, which could be utilized, and there was also a hospital nearby. Furthermore, "the location ensured that any pro-Nazi activities would be isolated in this rather lonely part of New Mexico."

The first internees to arrive at Fort Stanton came in January 1941. At that time, the post was still under construction, so the Germans were tasked with building accommodations for the newcomers. The Germans built four barracks, a kitchen, a mess hall, a laundry room, lavatories and washrooms, shops, an officer's quarters, and a medical dispensary. There were also gardens for fresh produce, a recreation hall, and a swimming pool in which "mini-Olympic" competitions were held with the local population.

At first, the camp resembled more of a small town than a prison. The Germans were allowed much freedom because the United States and Germany were not yet at war. Still, after Adolf Hitler's declaration on December 9, 1941, permission to go to Capitan or hike in the nearby mountains was no longer obtainable. For two years the German sailors had waited to go home, and now that the war had begun, they were no longer being held as "distressed seamen" but instead as enemy aliens who could only be released when the war was over. At this time, the guard towers and barbed wire fences were built.

== The Escape ==
There were a few escape attempts before and after the incident in November 1942; the Germans "climbed fences, walked off work details, or dug tunnels," but all of the escapees were caught and returned to the camp. After a while, the Germans likely felt that escaping was futile because of the area's remoteness. Apart from Mexico, which is over 100 miles south of Fort Stanton, there was nowhere to escape to. Even still, four men attempted to make the journey.

On the night of November 1, 1942, Bruno Dathe, Willy Michel, Hermann Runne, and Johannes Grantz managed to sneak out of the camp, using the darkness as cover, and make their way south towards the border. Their absence from the camp was soon discovered, so a large manhunt conducted by the police in New Mexico, Texas, and Mexico began. The Germans did not get very far: On November 3, a rancher and member of a posse named Bob Boyce spotted the escapees while guarding Gabaldon Canyon. Boyce immediately sent word to the main body of the posse, which was under the command of Deputy Joe Nelson and consisted of about twenty-five men. After a little trailing, the posse found the Germans about fourteen miles south of the camp, on a hill inside the Lincoln National Forest. According to contemporary newspapers, the Germans were either bathing in a stream or sleeping on the grassy hill when the possemen rode up to them on horseback. It was thought that one of the escapees was armed with an automatic pistol, but one of the escapees confirmed later in life that none of them were armed, as they had no access to any guns and had just run away. There was a brief shootout, resulting in the wounding of one of the Germans, but all were detained and quickly taken back to Fort Stanton.

== Newspaper accounts ==
The following was reported in the November 3, 1942 edition of the Tucson Daily Citizen:

German seamen prisoners in a federal detention camp at Fort Stanton were trapped by armed possemen in the mountains west of here today [fol]lowing their escape Sunday night[.] The quartet was spotted by Bob Boyce, a rancher, as they were [tak]ing a bath in a canyon stream[.] One of the Germans Boyce reported back was armed with a pistol[.] Boyce took up guard and sent word back to the posse, which had been searching the mountains all night for the prisoners. Armed men at once departed for the scene only a few miles from Fort [Stan]ton Given The [F]ederal Bureau of [Investiga]tion gave the names... Bruno Dathe Willy Michel Hermanne Runne and Johannes Grantz[.] They are among some 400 [men] interned by the government at Fort Stanton after they scuttled their ship, the German liner [Col]lumbus in the Atlantic at the out-break of the war in Europe They were brought to the central New Mexico mountains here from San Francisco[.] (sic)

The following appeared in the November 4, 1942, edition of the Montreal Gazette:

A mounted, gun-toting posse of ranchers and cattlemen rounded up and corralled four escaped German prisoners from the federal internment camp at Fort Stanton today. On[e] prisoner was wounded slightly in a brief exchange of gunfire as the posse surprised the sleeping Germans on a hillside in the Lincoln National Forest about 14 miles from Fort Stanton. The Germans, seamen from the scuttled liner Columbus, were interned after the outbreak of the European war in 1939. They escaped Sunday night. They were spotted earlier in the day in Gabaldon Canyon west of Ruidoso by Bob Boyce, a rancher. Standing guard at the Canyon. Boyce sent back word to the main body of the p[o]sse. He was joined by about 25 armed men led by Deputy Sheriff Joe Nelson. The group rode up on the Germans with guns out. It hart previously been reported that at least one of the prisoners carried an automatic pistol. (sic)

== See also ==
- Arizona during World War II
- List of prisoner-of-war escapes
- Military history of the United States during World War II
