= Lordsburg killings =

1942 double-homicide

Lordsburg Killings
- Part of the internment of Japanese Americans
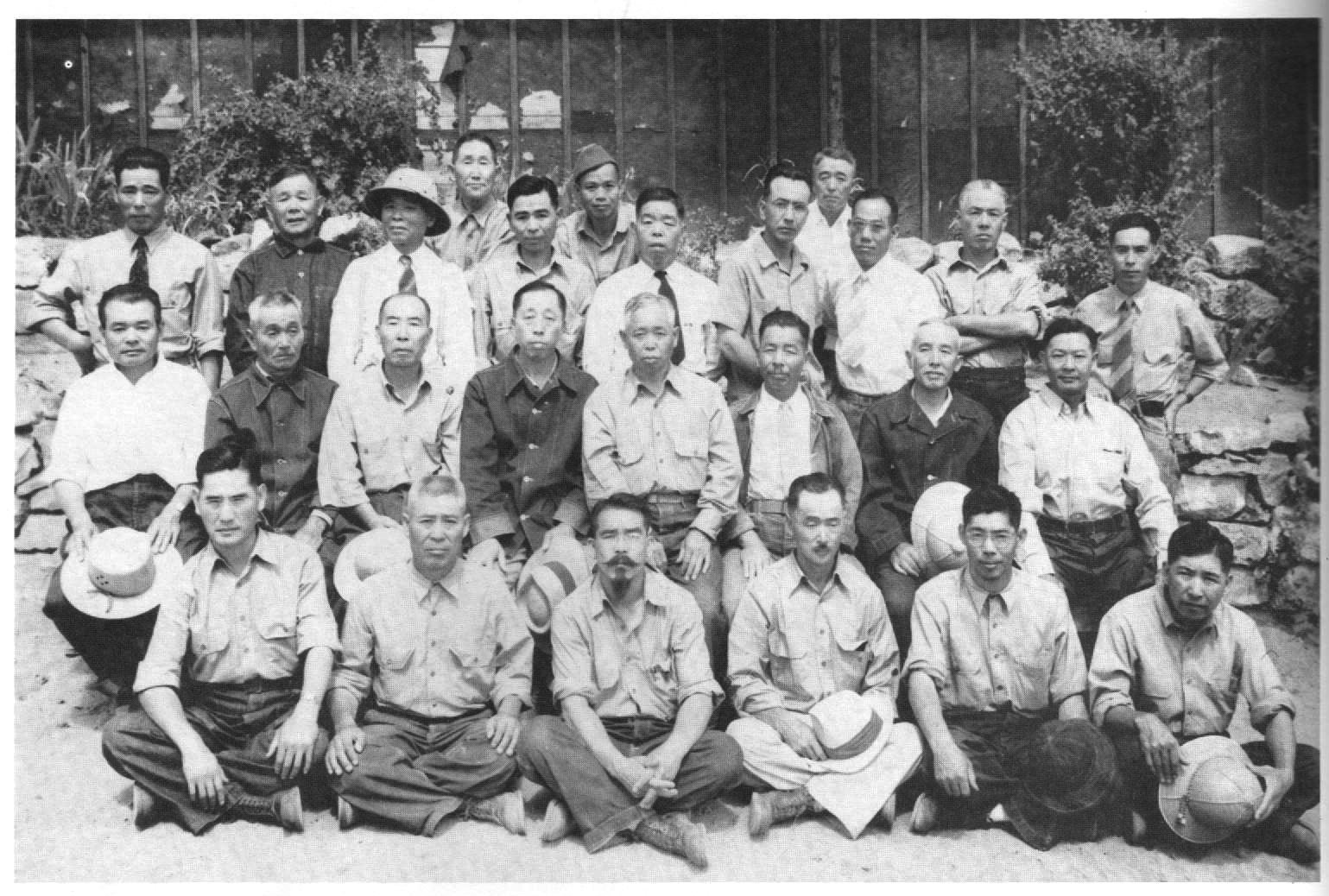
- Japanese internees, who came from the Monterey, Salinas, and Watsonville areas of California, at Camp Lordsburg
- Date: July 27, 1942
- Location: Near Lordsburg, Hidalgo County, New Mexico, United States
- Type: Double-homicide by shooting
- Motive: Disputed
- Deaths: 2
- Accused: Clarence Burleson
- Charges: Manslaughter
- Verdict: Not guilty

The Lordsburg killings refers to the shooting of two elderly Japanese American men named Toshio Kobata and Hirota Isomura at an internment camp outside Lordsburg, New Mexico, on July 27, 1942. The shooter, Private First Class Clarence Burleson, was charged with murder, but this was later reduced to manslaughter and he was acquitted after testifying that he was following military protocol.

== Background ==
Camp Lordsburg was originally an internment camp managed by the Department of Justice. Construction began shortly after the Japanese attack on Pearl Harbor on December 7, 1941, and the site chosen for the facility was just outside the small desert town of Lordsburg, in New Mexico's southwestern corner. The camp consisted of three compounds, each with a barracks, latrines, and so forth. The first group of internees, all men from California, arrived in the first week of June 1942. They were considered to be "potentially dangerous" by the FBI, claiming that their "incarceration [was] essential for national security."

The incident on July 27 was not the first shooting to occur at Camp Lordsburg. Although the Department of Justice managed the camp, the United States Army was responsible for delivering the internees via the Southern Pacific Railroad. In order to keep from frightening the local civilian population, the army would offload the internees at a railroad station, known as Ulmoris Siding, about two miles from the camp, and march the internees through the desert very late at night or early in the morning. A 1978 dispatch from New Mexico's Office of the State Historian describes one of these night marches: "One elderly internee broke into a run across the fields, and although his friends were cautioning him in Japanese and the guards were calling "Halt!," he kept running in apparent panic until he was shot and killed."

== Killings ==
On the night of July 27, 1942, a group of 147 Japanese men were being transported to Camp Lordsburg from another camp at Fort Lincoln, North Dakota. After getting off the train at Ulmoris Siding, Toshio Kobata and Hirota Isomura were walking down the road together and behind all the others. Both were in their late fifties and could not keep up with the pace. Kobata had suffered from tuberculosis for 16 years according to his friend Hiroshi Aisawa. Fukujiro Hoshiya, a good friend of Isomura, reported that "he hurt his spine... years ago, falling off a boat... At the Bismarck Camp [North Dakota], he walked with a very much stoop." It was also said that Hoshiya's "whole body would tremble" when he stood, and that he could not run.

The shooting occurred sometime during the two-mile trek through the Chihuahuan Desert. Clarence Burleson saw the two internees wander off of the road. According to the official report, Burleson shouted "Halt!" twice before shooting both of the men with a shotgun at about 30 yards (27 m) away. The coroner later found nine pellets each in the middle left portion of their backs, and since the shot pattern was not very wide, it was an indication that the shooting occurred at close range. It was also revealed that the two men had asked the guards to use a restroom, but the guards denied them permission to do so. This suggested that the victims may have walked off the road to relieve themselves.

A portion of the official government response follows:

After Hirota Isomura and Toshiro Kobata entered the reservation but before they were within the camp enclosure, they suddenly made a break and started running toward the boundary of the reservation. The guard shouted to them twice to halt and when his order was not obeyed he fired in accordance with his standing instructions. Hirota Isomura died instantly and Toshiro Kobata a few hours later. An inquiry into the circumstances was conducted at once. The court-martial of the guard was vigorously prosecuted and all the facts were developed. An acquittal of the guard resulted.

== Aftermath ==
At first, Burleson was treated as a hero for stopping an "escape attempt." An officer at the facility even collected the shotgun shells used in the killing as souvenirs and said that Burleson "deserved a medal." Army headquarters, on the other hand, did not take the incident so lightly and immediately launched an investigation of the affair. As a result, Burleson was eventually arrested, charged with "willfully and lawfully" committing murder, and then sent to the Eighth Army's headquarters at Fort Bliss, Texas, for a court martial. The court could not prosecute Burleson for "willfully and lawfully" committing murder, since, according to him, the prisoners were trying to run away and he was merely following standing orders. Consequently, the murder charges were reduced to manslaughter and he was acquitted.

The result of the court martial was not accepted by everyone. A memo from the Department of State says: "Examination of the Army's reports on the shootings gives the impression that the Army's shooting rule comes close to making death, rather than up to 30 days arrest as provided in Article 54 of the Geneva Convention, the penalty for attempted escape." The Government of Japan under Prime Minister Hideki Tōjō also protested the killing, after hearing about it from internees who had been expatriated, and lodged a formal complaint. The Japanese said that "it is inconceivable that aged invalids hardly able to walk should while under military escort have attempted to escape."

A Japanese internee, Sematsu Ishizaki, claimed that the camp's commandant, Colonel Clyde Lundy, ordered the deaths of Kobata and Isomura. Apparently, the two men had been involved in a protest against the working conditions at the camp and Lundy wanted to make an example out of them for challenging his authority. Ishizaki said: "I don't think they were trying to run away because they were striking [protesting] here and [Lundy] had the internees shut up in the barracks for more than ten days, and it [the shooting] was done just for an example." It was also noted that on the day after the shooting, Lundy released the internees from house arrest and the "forced labor" resumed. The prisoners knew the labor they had to do was illegal under the Geneva Convention and they pressed for fair treatment under that standard. Their suit eventually led Eighth Army headquarters at Fort Bliss to retire Lundy, close the camp at Lordsburg, and move everyone to Camp Santa Fe.

Presently, barracks, concrete, and foundations of some of the buildings at the camp can still be visited, in addition to a historical marker that is located near the site.

The marker reads as follows:

Camp Lordsburg - Near this site the U.S. Army operated a camp during World War II. It opened as an internment camp for Japanese and Japanese-American civilians from 1942-43. It later reopened as the Lordsburg Prisoner of War Camp for Germans and Italians from 1943-45. This camp is one of the few sites in the U.S. to house Japanese, Germans and Italians during its operations.
