= SS Columbus (1922) =

German ship

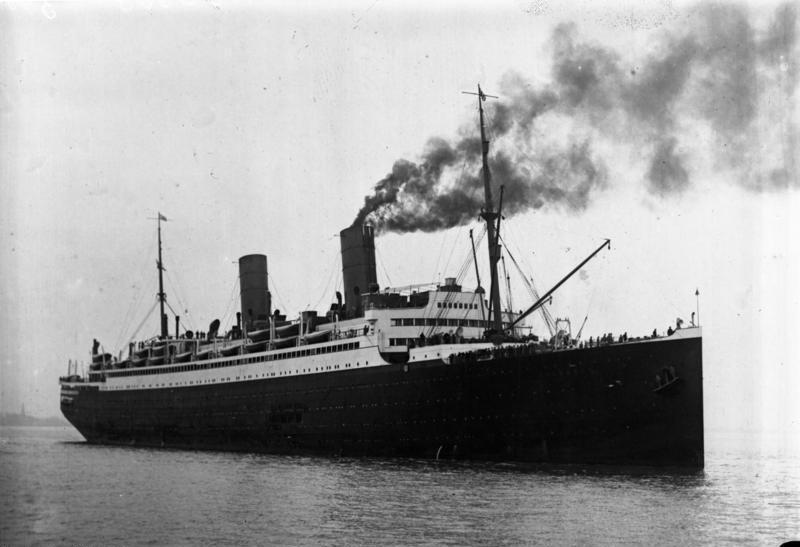
- SS Columbus

History

Germany
- Name: Columbus
- Namesake: Christopher Columbus
- Owner: Norddeutscher Lloyd
- Operator: Germany
- Port of registry: Bremen, Germany
- Route: Bremerhaven–New York
- Ordered: 1914
- Builder: Schichau, Danzig, Germany
- Yard number: 929
- Launched: 12 August 1922
- Completed: June 1924
- Maiden voyage: Mid-1924
- In service: 1924
- Out of service: 1939
- Renamed: 1914; Hindenburg to Columbus; 1920
- Refit: 1929
- Home port: Bremen
- Motto: "Columbus' ship"
- Nickname(s): "Germany's Merchant Ship"
- Fate: Scuttled by crew to avoid capture by Royal Navy, 19 December 1939.
- Notes: Located at latitude 38 degrees, 2 minutes N, longitude 65 degrees, 33 minutes W

General characteristics
- Class & type: Columbus-class ocean liner
- Tonnage: 32,354 GRT (1924–1929); 32,565 GRT (1929–1939)
- Length: 750 ft (230 m)
- Beam: 83 ft (25 m)
- Height: 49 ft (15 m)
- Decks: 8
- Propulsion: Triple-expansion reciprocating engines (1924–1929); Steam turbine engines (1929−1939); Twin propeller
- Speed: Before refit: 18 knots (33 km/h; 21 mph); After refit: 20 knots (37 km/h; 23 mph)
- Boats & landing craft carried: 24
- Capacity: 1,750 passengers

SS Columbus was a German ocean liner laid down and launched as Hindenburg before the start of World War I.

The vessel was originally to be named Hindenburg. However, her then-sister, originally named Columbus, was handed over to British government and then sold to the White Star Line after the war as part of reparations in 1920 and renamed Homeric by her new owners.

The Allies allowed the Norddeutscher Lloyd (NDL), her owners, to keep the remaining ship. NDL decided to give her the name of her departed sister, now the British Homeric. Construction, which had been held up by the war, resumed at Schichau Shipyards in Danzig, Germany.

== Construction and maiden voyage ==
Hull of the Columbus under construction at F. Schichau.

Material shortages caused by the war delayed her completion until 1922. She made her maiden voyage in April 1924. At the time, she was the German merchant marine's largest, fastest ocean liner. She measured 32,581 gross register tons (GRT), was 750 feet (230 m) long with 1,750 cabins for luxury, first, second and tourist class passengers. The maximum speed was 18 knots (33 km/h; 21 mph), propulsion was supplied by triple-expansion steam engines.

Columbus was quite popular and convinced NDL that larger passenger liners were feasible. She was also one of the first liners to have an outside swimming pool installed on her top deck, as well as a platform for night-time dancing. "She had been chartered for a number of years by Cooks Travel Agency in New York and cruised into West Indian waters about every two weeks with occasional trips around South America and Africa."

== Later career ==
With the building of the liners Bremen and Europa, Columbus was supplanted as the flagship of the NDL fleet. In 1929, the liner was given a refit to modernise the vessel and was remodelled in the style of her younger, larger and faster running mates. This included the addition of two larger, much shorter smokestacks and replacement of the reciprocating engines with geared steam turbines.

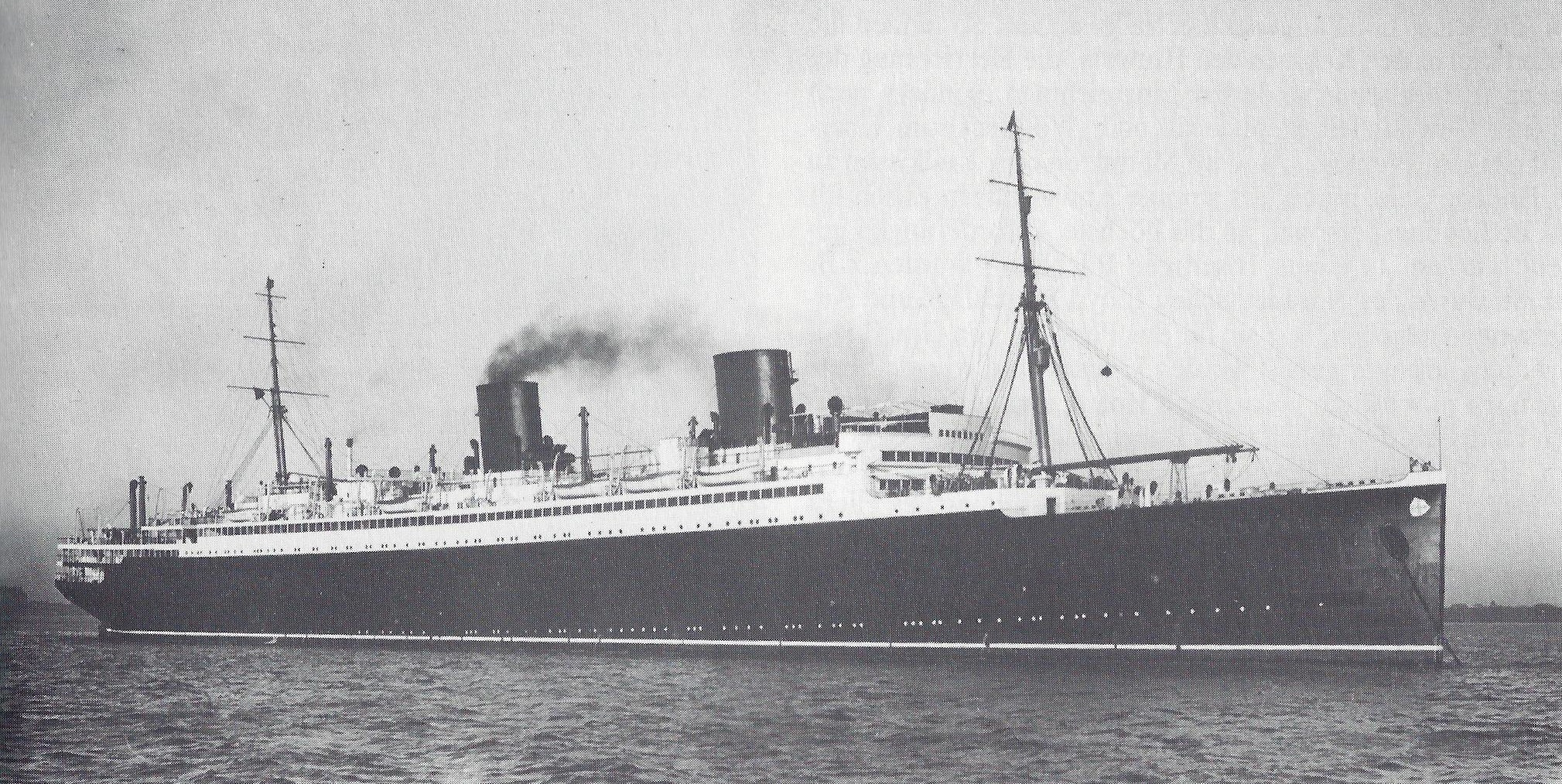
Columbus after her 1929 refit, with squat funnels in the style of Bremen and Europa

At the outbreak of World War II in September 1939, Columbus was ordered to immediately return to Germany. The Royal Navy was on the lookout for enemy ships. Putting her passengers ashore at Havana, Cuba, the ship travelled to Veracruz, evading the British. In early November, they received orders to attempt a blockade run to Germany. On 14 December, Columbus departed Veracruz, escorted by seven American destroyers through the American coastal neutrality zone. On 19 December, the British destroyer HMS Hyperion sighted Columbus about 400 miles (640 km) off the coast of Virginia. The still neutral American heavy cruiser USS Tuscaloosa was also in the area and discretely observed the two ships.

Rather than surrender the ship, the crew scuttled. Her passengers and crew, 576 crewmembers, including boys, stevedores and nurses, were taken aboard Tuscaloosa as rescued seamen, not as prisoners of war as they would have been had the British picked them up. Tuscaloosa took all personnel to New York City. On 18 January 1940, 512 crewmen were moved to Angel Island. In October, eight officers were able to escape on the Asama Maru. In 1941, 411 German nationals from the Columbus were sent to Fort Stanton, New Mexico. At the end of war many returned to Germany.

On 11 December 1941, in a speech before the German Reichstag announcing his decision to declare war on the United States, Adolf Hitler described the presence of Tuscaloosa at the scuttling of the Columbus as a hostile act against the German nation, insisting that the American cruiser had forced the liner "into the hands of British warships". As such, Hitler listed the loss of the Columbus among the casus belli for his declaration of war.

== See also ==
- Escape from Fort Stanton
