= Arizona during World War II =

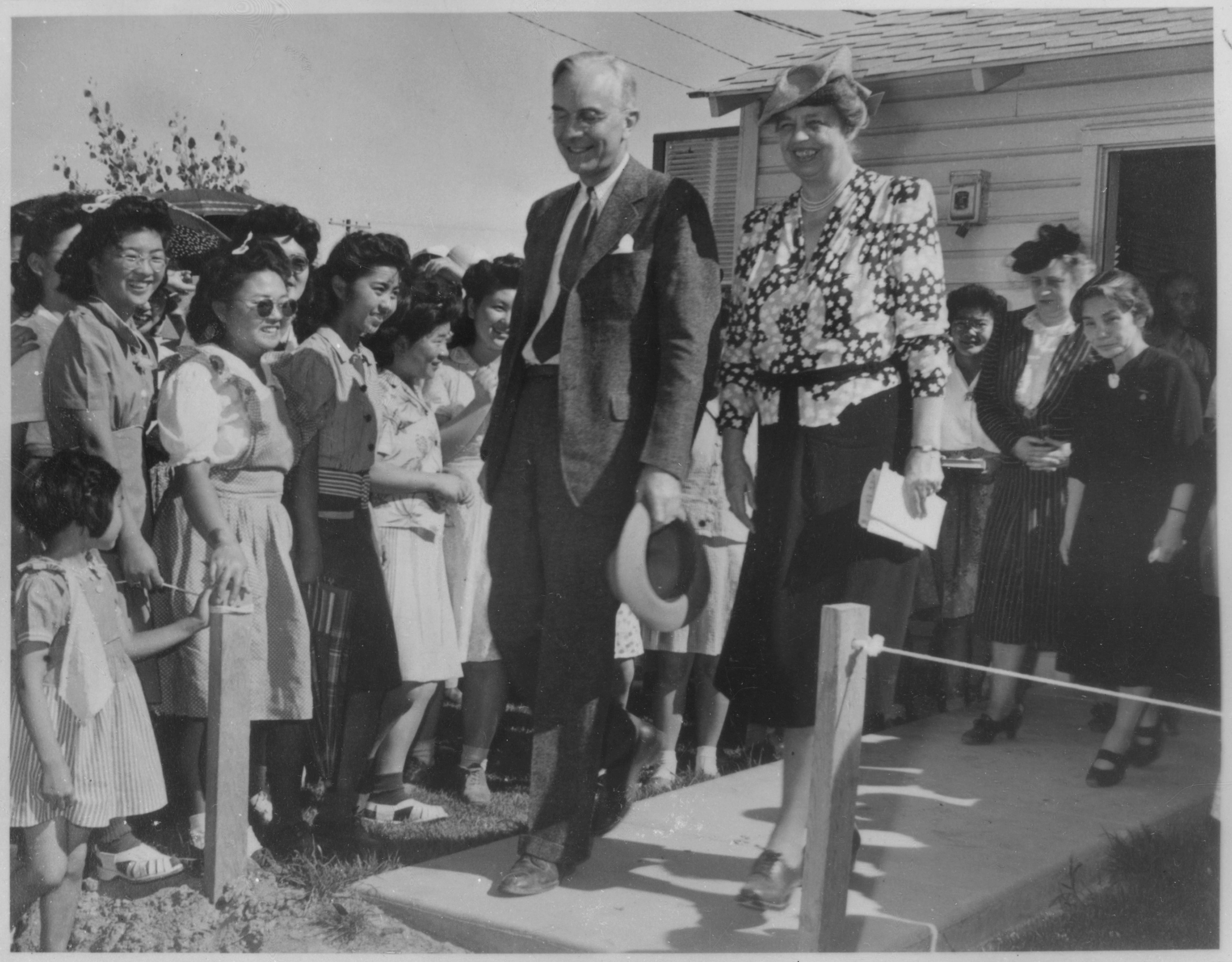
- First Lady Eleanor Roosevelt and Dillon S. Myer visit the Gila River War Relocation Center (April 23, 1943)
- Date: 1940–1945
- Location: Arizona, United States
- Casualties: ~2,349
- Machita Incident: October 16, 1940
- Thanksgiving Day / Phoenix Massacre: November 27, 1942
- Great Papago Escape: December 23, 1944

The history of Arizona during World War II begins in 1940, when the United States government began constructing military bases within the state in preparation for war. Arizona's contribution to the Allied war effort was significant both in terms of manpower and facilities supported in the state. Prisoner of war camps were operated at Camp Florence and Papago Park. Also, two incarceration camps – the Gila River War Relocation Center and the Poston War Relocation Center – housed Japanese-American citizens and Japanese immigrants who had been forcibly removed from the West Coast.

The war years provided great economic stimulus, both because of the numbers of troops at camps in the state, and increase in demand, and the expansion of wartime demand for such materials as copper and other metals. Industries expanded, adding to the state's recovery from the Great Depression.

== Latinos ==
During the war, Mexican-American community organizations promoted efforts to support American troops abroad. They worked both to support the war effort materially and to provide moral support for young American men fighting the war, especially their young Mexican-American men from local communities. Some community projects were cooperative between Anglo and Hispanic communities, but most were localized within the Mexican-American community. Mexican-American women also organized to assist their servicemen and the war effort; an underlying goal of Tucson's Spanish-American Mothers and Wives Association was the reinforcement of the woman's role in Spanish-Mexican culture. Members raised thousands of dollars, wrote letters, and joined in numerous celebrations of their culture and their support for Mexican-American servicemen. Membership reached more than 300 during the war. The organization stopped operating in 1976.

== Casualties ==
Army and Air Forces
County	Killed in Action (KIA)	Died of Wounds (DOW)	Died of Injuries (DOI)	Died, Non-Battle (DNB)	Finding of Death (FOD)	Missing in Action (MIA)	Total
Apache	27	3		20	1		51
Cochise	68	8		24	10	1	111
Coconino	31			14	4		49
Gila	47	12		21	7		87
Graham	31	4		12	1	1	49
Greenlee	18	4		6	2	1	31
Maricopa	277	35		161	40	1	514
Mohave	9	2		9	2		22
Navajo	36	5		17	6		64
Pima	145	13	1	67	12	1	239
Pinal	66	15		32	2		115
Santa Cruz	28	1		13	1		43
Yavapai	47	4		22	7		80
Yuma	55	6	1	13	5		80
State at Large	31	3		33	8	3	78
Total	916	115	2	464	108	8	1613

Navy, Marine Corps, and Coast Guard
Type	Total
Killed in Action (KIA)	27
Killed in Prison Camps	11
Missing in Action (MIA)	17
Wounded in Action (WIA)	41
Released from Prison Camps	17
Total	113

== Incarceration camps ==
During World War II, the United States government wrongfully removed and incarcerated approximately 120,000 Japanese Americans and Japanese immigrants, sending them first to temporary assembly centers, and then to inland concentration camps. Arizona was home to an assembly center in Mayer, Arizona and one in Poston (called the Parker Dam Reception Center), and two incarceration camps – the Gila River War Relocation Center and Poston War Relocation Center, which together held approximately 24,000 men, women, and children. The state was also home to the Leupp Isolation Center, which held “troublemakers” from other incarceration camps, and the Catalina Federal Honor Camp (renamed as the Gordon Hirabayashi Campground in 1999) which held draft resisters and conscientious objectors.

== Prisoner of war camps ==
Arizona's Camp Florence, on the Florence Military Reservation, was the first permanent alien enemy camp constructed during World War II. Construction began during 1942 to house 3000 internees, with room to expand to 6000. The initial construction budget was $4.8 million. The United States did not detain numerous enemy aliens here, so the Army used Camp Florence as a POW camp.

== Gallery ==
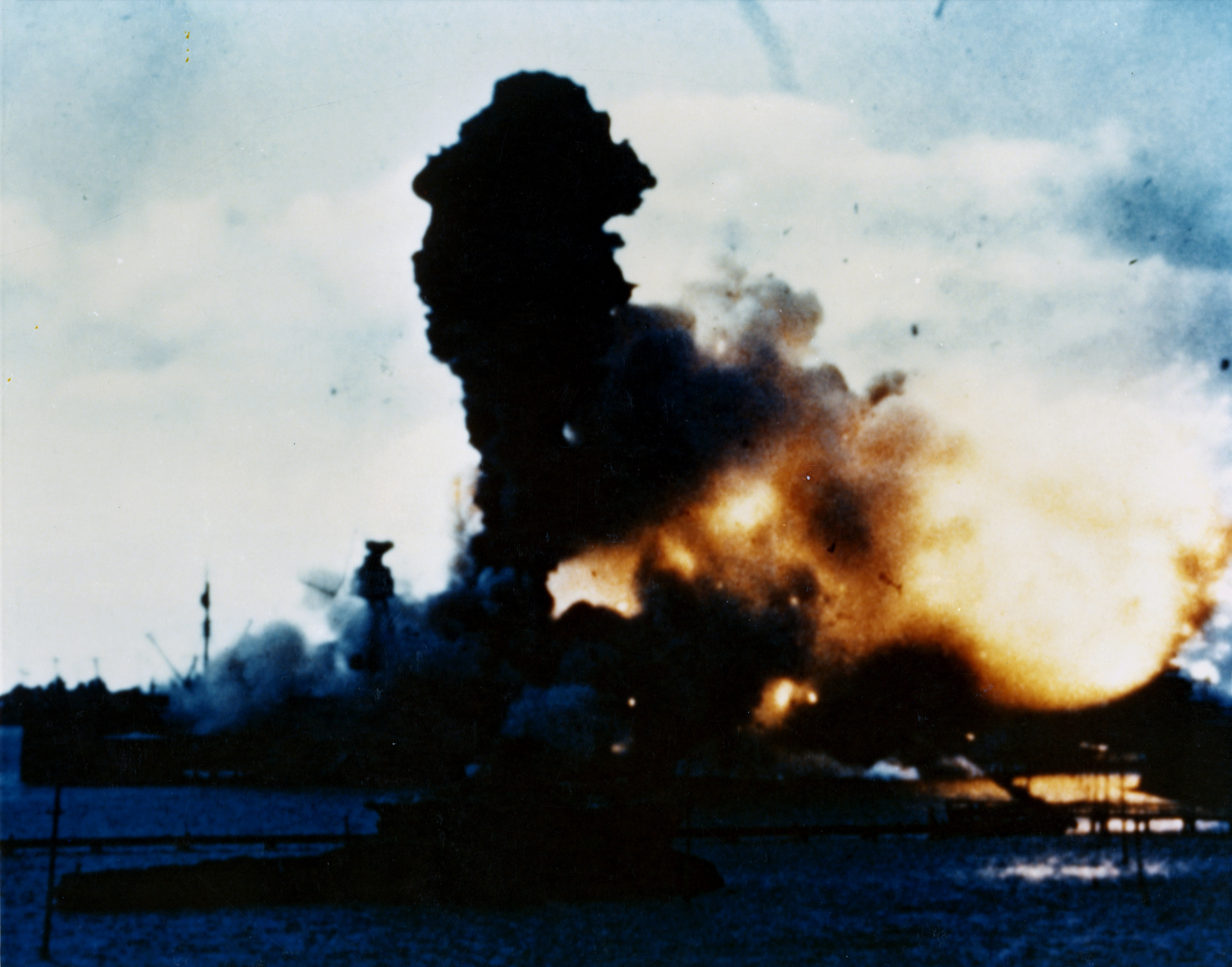
Eight Arizonans were killed aboard USS Arizona during the attack on Pearl Harbor.

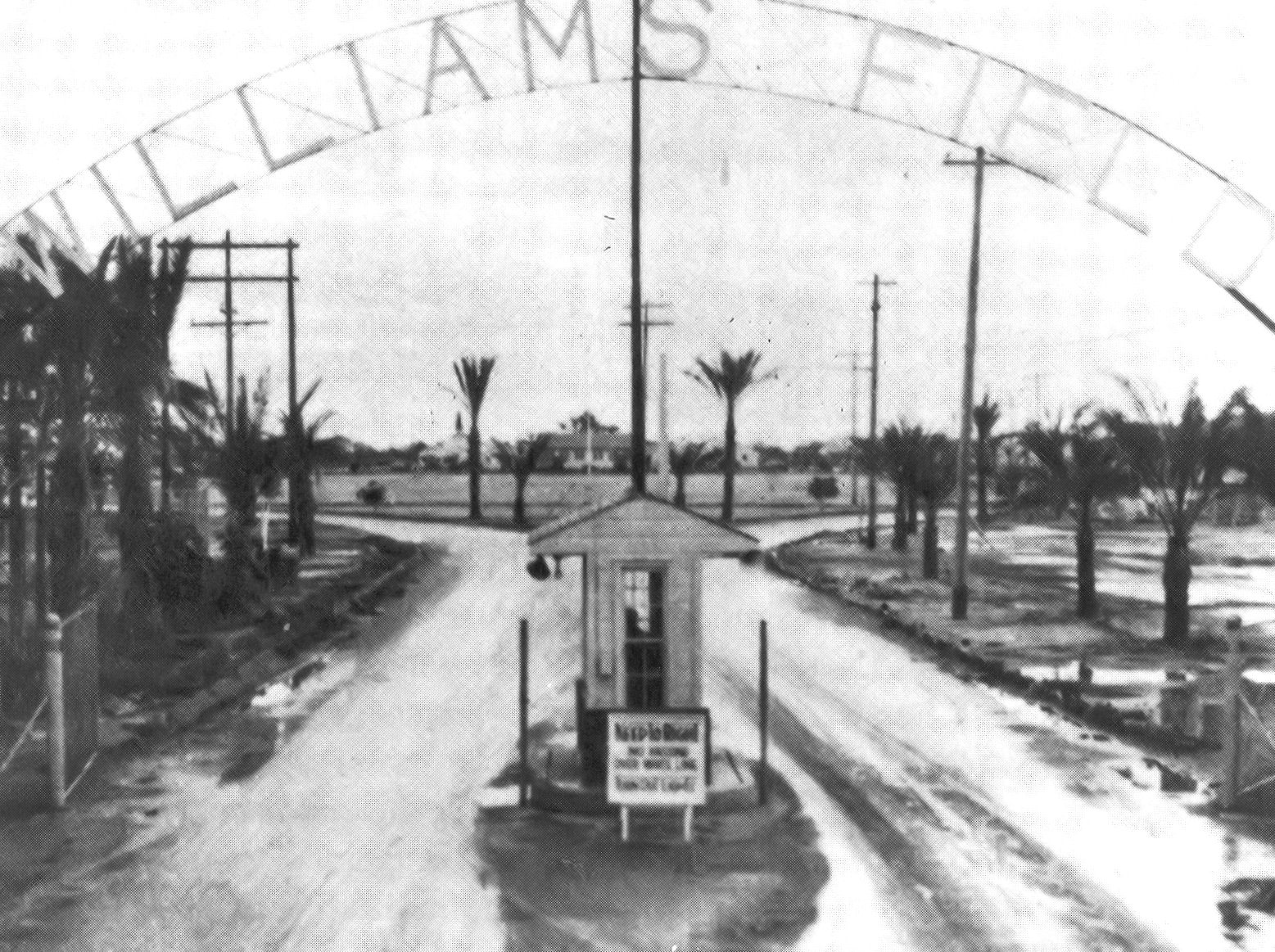
The entrance to Williams Field in 1942.

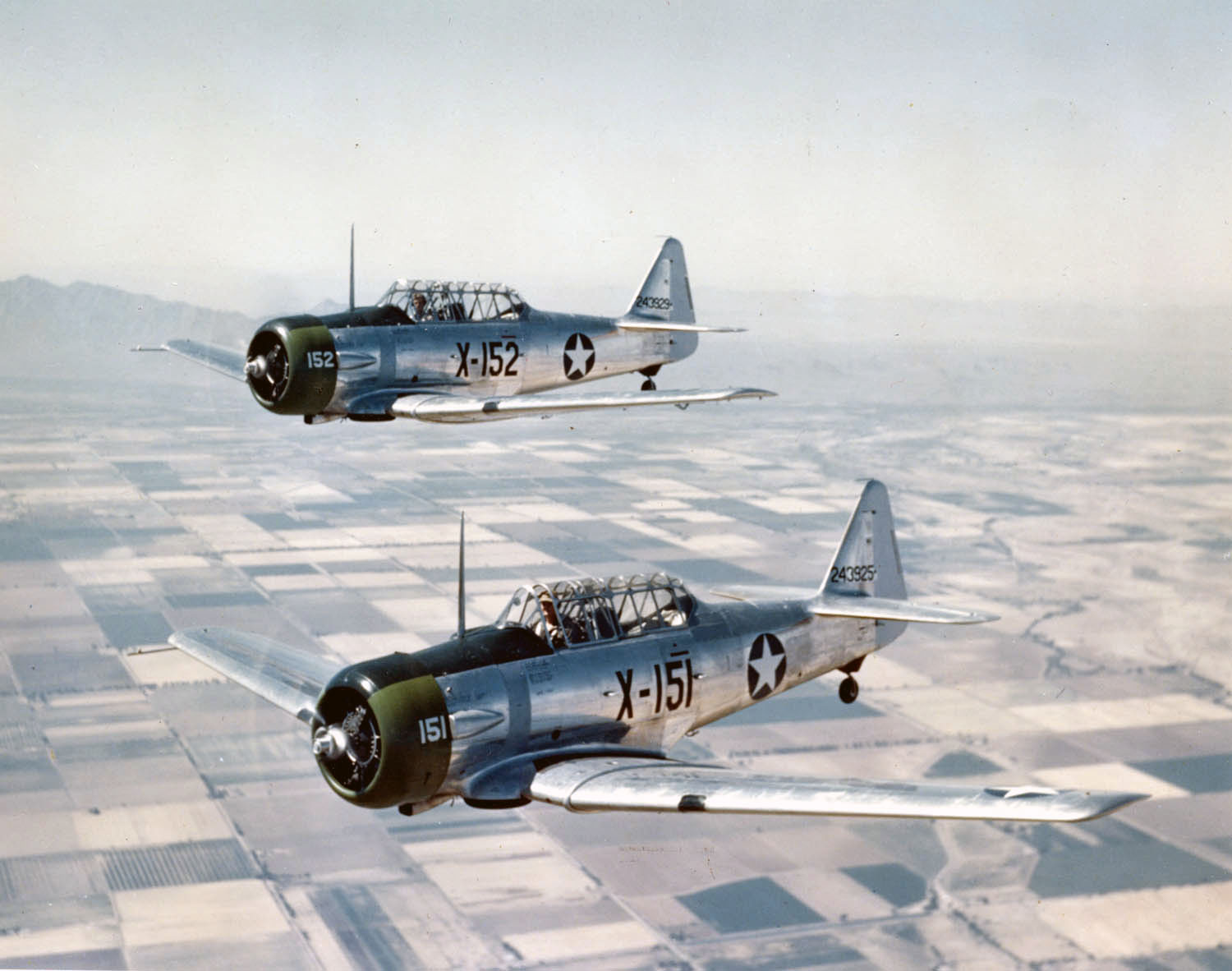
Two AT-6 Texans in flight near Luke Field in 1943.

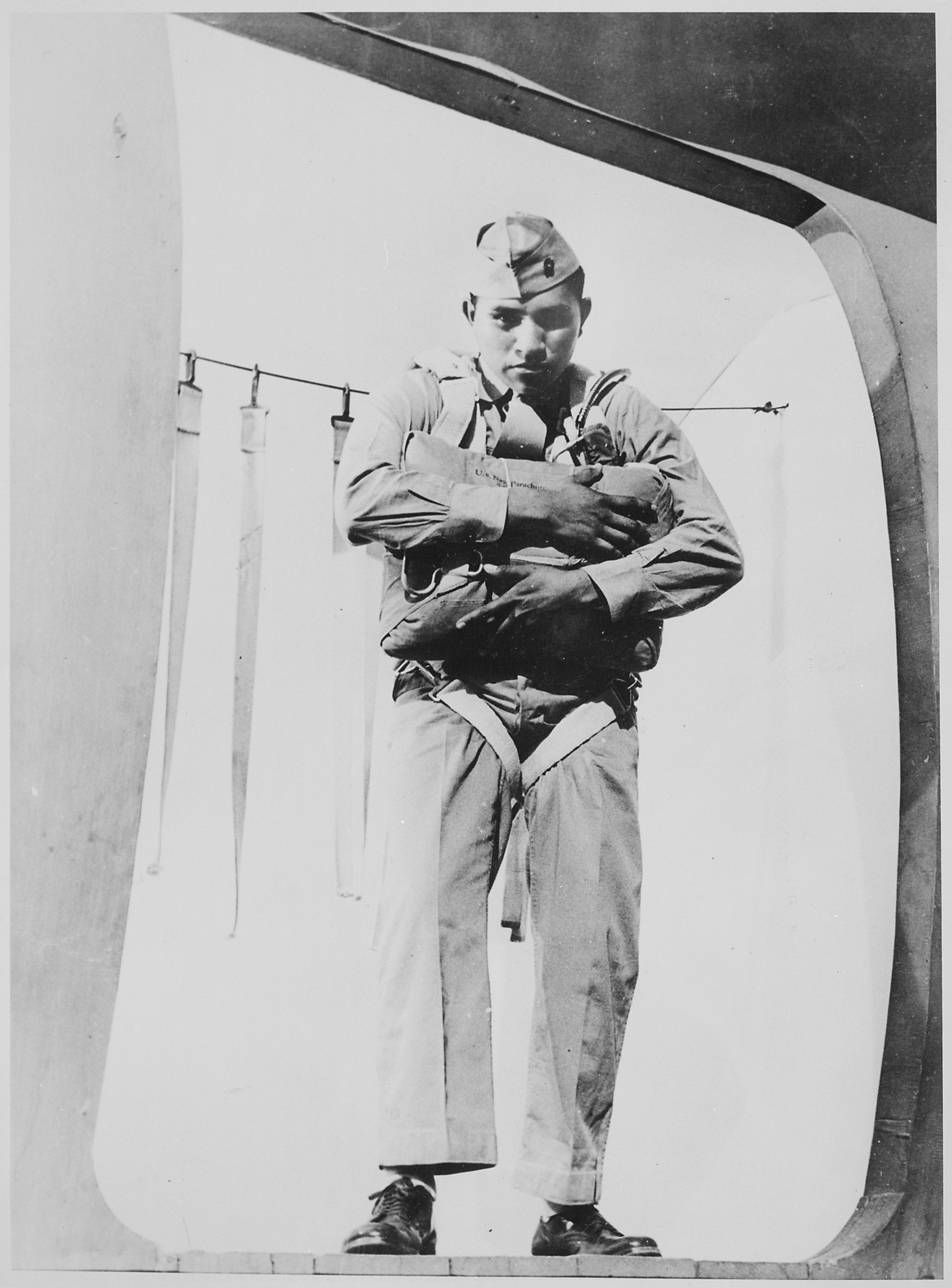
Ira Hayes (Pima) seen here preparing to parachute out of an aircraft in 1943, was from Sacaton. He fought in many engagements in the South Pacific before becoming famous for raising the American flag on Mount Suribachi during the Battle of Iwo Jima.

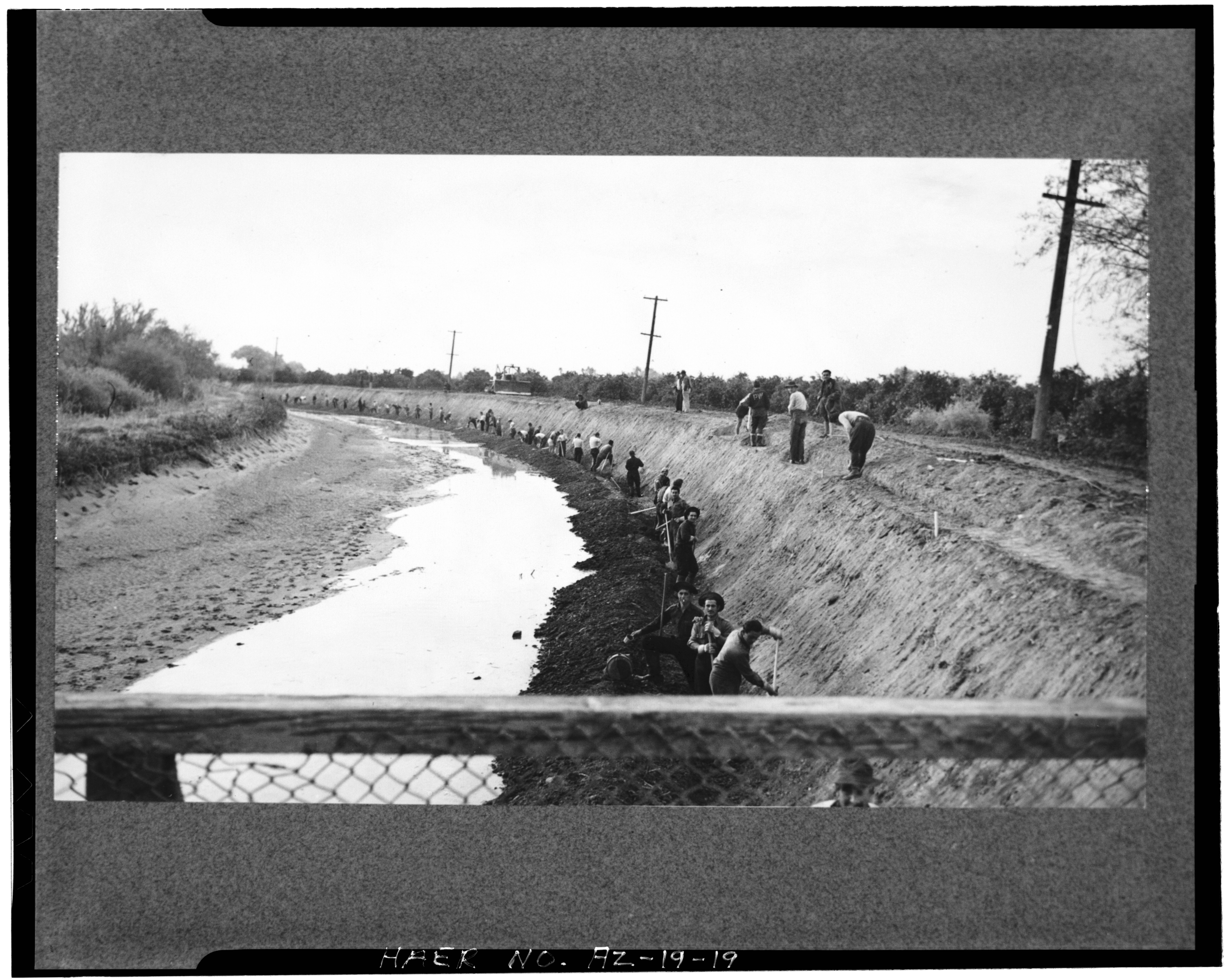
Italian prisoners of war work on the Arizona Canal in 1943.

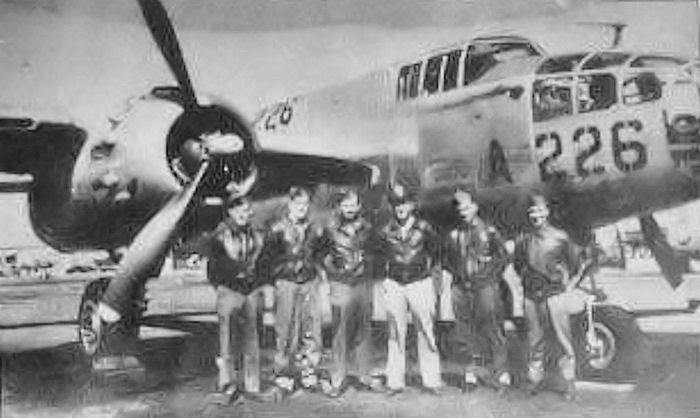
B-25 Mitchell crewmen at Douglas Army Airfield in 1944.

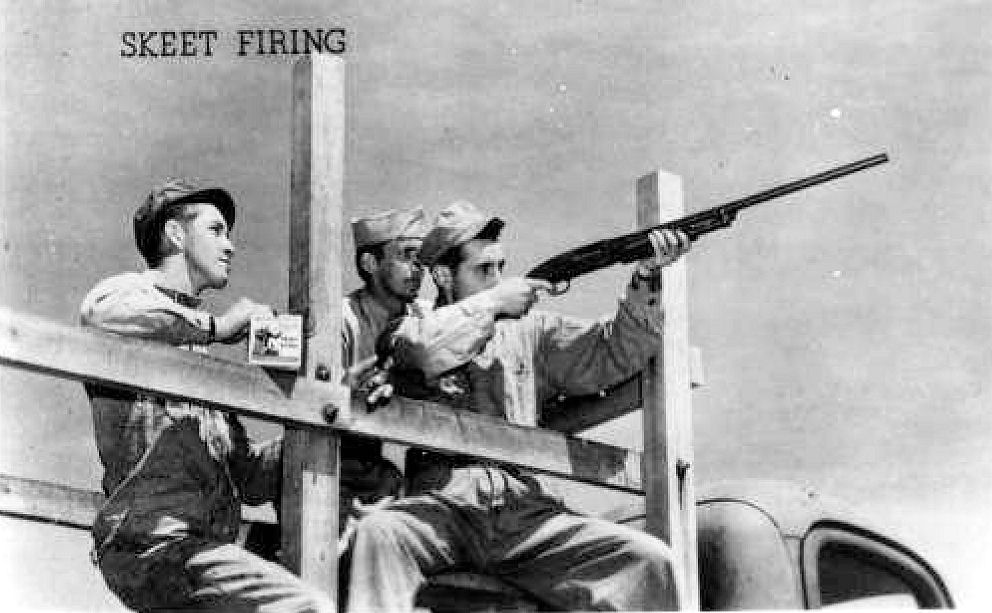
Skeet shooting at Kingman Field in 1944.

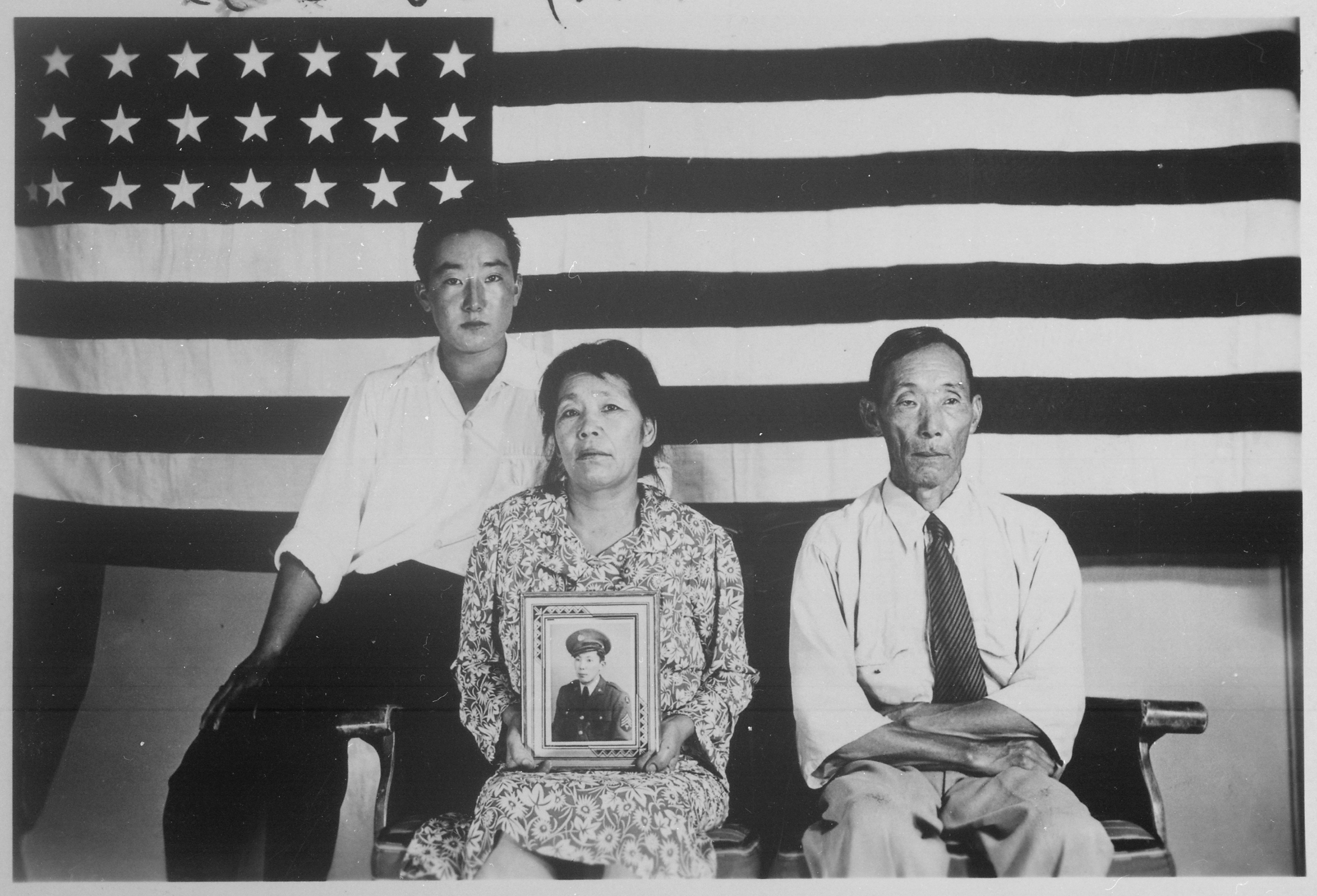
The Hirano family, ethnic Japanese removed from California, were among thousands interned at the Poston War Relocation Center from 1942 to 1945.

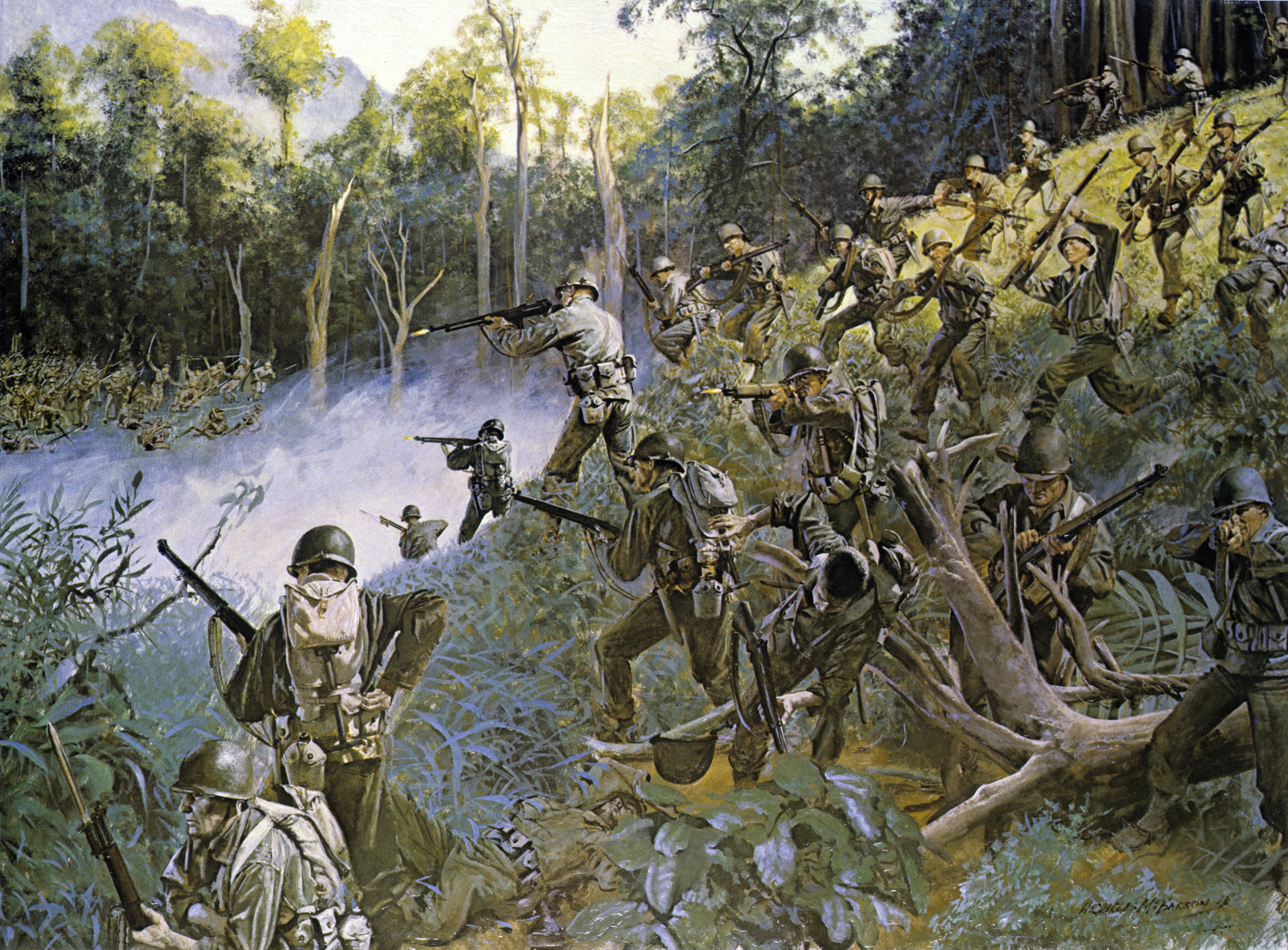
The Bushmasters during the Philippines Campaign in 1945.

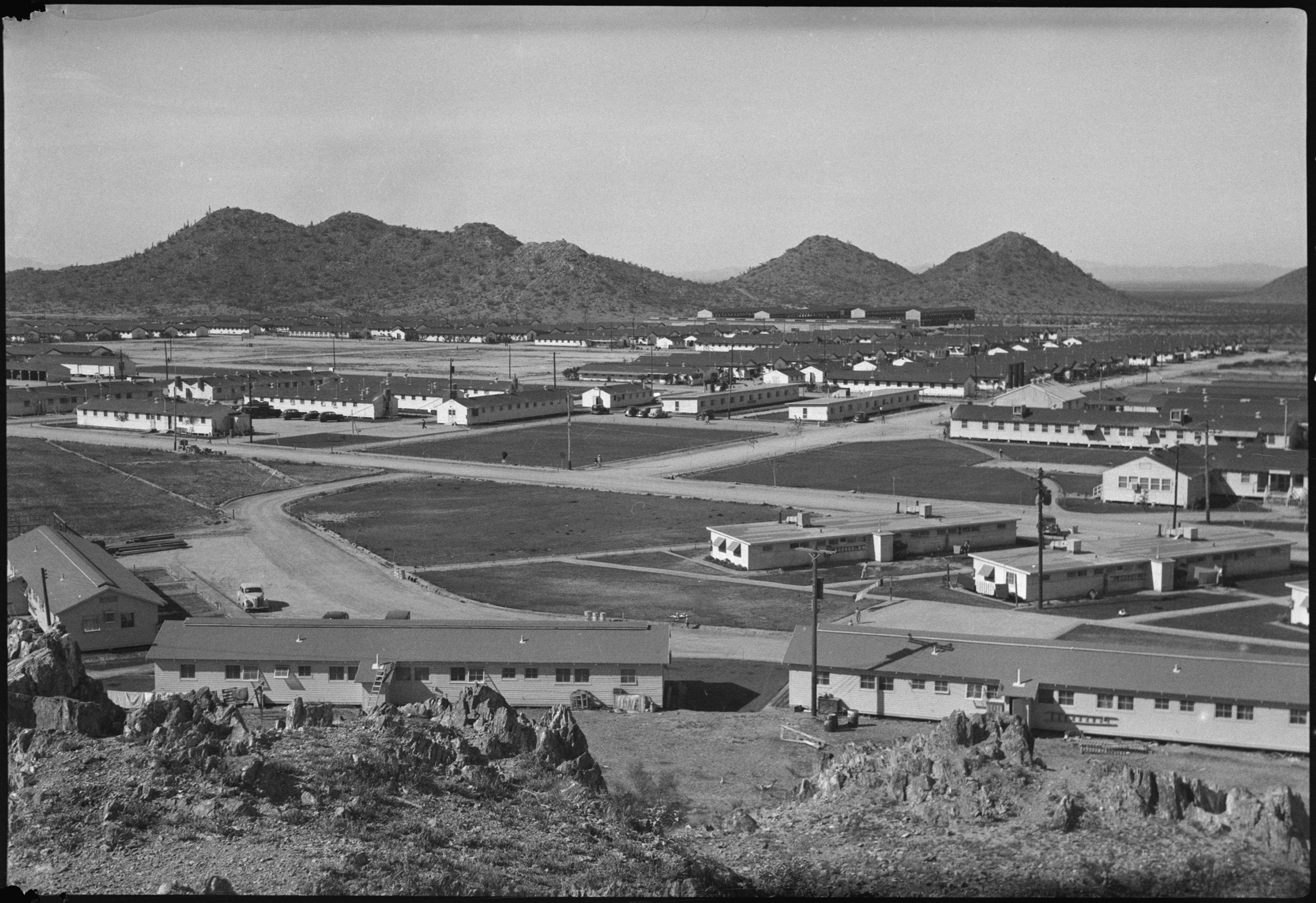
Gila River Relocation Center, Rivers, Arizona. Butte Camp View

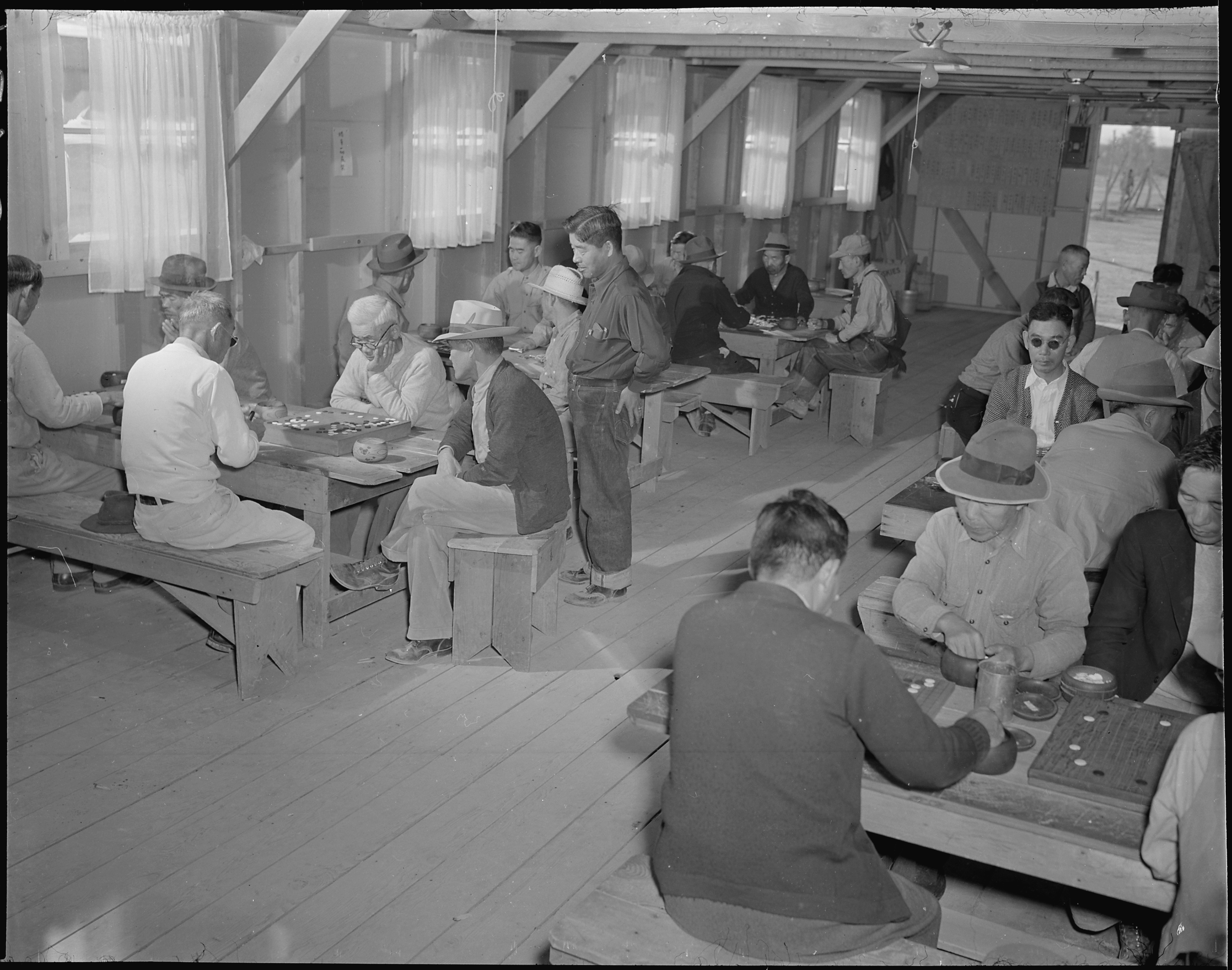
Gila River Relocation Center, Rivers, Arizona. A general view in the recreation hall of a group of evacuees playing "Go".

== See also ==
- American Theater (World War II)
- Battle of Ambos Nogales
- Bisbee Riot
- Fort Lawton Riot
- Military history of the United States during World War II
- Nevada during World War II
- New Mexico during World War II
- Arizona World War II Army Airfields
