= Santa Fe riot =

1945 riot at a Japanese internment camp in New Mexico, United States

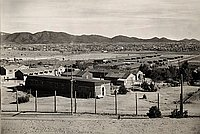
- The Santa Fe Internment Camp
- Date: March 12, 1945
- Location: Near Santa Fe, New Mexico, United States
- Outcome: 4 ethnic Japanese internees seriously injured

The Santa Fe riot was a confrontation at a Japanese internment camp near Santa Fe, New Mexico, during World War II. On March 12, 1945, approximately 275 internees assembled in Camp Santa Fe to watch and protest the removal of three men to another camp. During which, a scuffle broke out between the internees and the Border Patrol agents who were guarding the facility, resulting in the use of tear gas grenades, batons, and the serious injury of four internees.

== Background ==
In February 1942, the Department of Justice acquired 80 acres of land and an old Civilian Conservation Corps camp from the New Mexico State Penitentiary in order to establish a facility for enemy aliens. Unlike the War Relocation camps, which were much larger, the Santa Fe Internment Camp, or Camp Santa Fe, was guarded by Border Patrol agents, rather than soldiers. The original CCC camp could accommodate 450 people, but by March 1942 the facility had been expanded to house 1,400. Housing included wood and tarpaper buildings and 100 "victory huts", however, most of the huts were later replaced by military style wooden barracks.

The first group of internees consisted of 826 ethnic Japanese men from California, but they were relocated to other facilities by September 1942. German and Italian internees occupied the camp until February 1943 and in 1945 it was expanded again so as to accommodate 2,100 ethnic Japanese. The second group of ethnic Japanese included 366 "troublesome" young men from the Tule Lake War Relocation Center who had renounced their U.S. citizenship under the Renunciation Act of 1944, making them enemy aliens from the government's viewpoint and eligible for incarceration at the special enemy alien camps.

Violence at Camp Santa Fe was not unheard of. For example, in the spring of 1942, a small army of locals, equipped with shotguns and hatchets, marched on Camp Santa Fe after hearing news of the Bataan Death March, in which several New Mexican men were killed. However, the camp's commander managed to persuade the would-be attackers to desist, reasoning that it would only lead to harsher treatment of American prisoners of war in Japanese custody.

The internees from Tule Lake were described by author Everett M. Rogers: "They wore white headbands on their shaved heads, blew bugles, and behaved in a militantly Japanese manner." They were organized into two groups, with leaders described as "surly" by the camp's head of security, Abner Schrieber. The first group called themselves the Sokuji Kikoku Hoshi-Dan, meaning "the Organization to Return Immediately to the Homeland to Serve." The second was called the Hikoku Seinen-Dan, "the Organization to Serve Our Mother Country." The young "Tuleans," as they were called, were a lot different than the older residents of the camp that had been there longer. Some "isolated beatings" occurred between these two groups and, according to Rogers, "a strong-arm Suicide Squad threatened the camp's censors with death."

== Riot ==
On March 10, the camp guards made a complete search of the 366 men from Tule Lake, confiscating several dozen white shirts adorned with the Rising Sun, which had been banned at the facility. Because the shirts were part of a type of uniform, the internees protested. In response, the camp's commander arranged to have the leaders of the protest, three men, removed to Fort Stanton, which also housed enemy aliens. He also posted additional guards, equipped them with gas masks, submachine guns and shotguns, and told them to stay alert, because he expected trouble.

On the morning of March 12, between 250 and 300 of the internees gathered at the wire fence running in front of the administration center of the camp to watch the three men's departure and protest. At some point, a scuffle broke out and some of the ethnic Japanese began throwing rocks at the Border Patrol agents who were guarding the area. According to Abner Schrieber, he asked the crowd of protesters to disperse "four or five times" and had his secretary take notes on what was happening for his official report of the incident. When the demands to disperse were ignored, Schrieber ordered his men to fire tear gas grenades into the crowd and disperse it using batons. The ensuing melee was brief, but in that time four men were injured badly enough to where they had to be hospitalized. The four men were Mitsuo Hirashima, Akira Osugi, Gentaro Ono and Isamu Uchida.

Yasutaro Soga, an internee from Hawaii, later gave a "vivid" eyewitness account of the incident in Japanese:

In 1945, March 12, the clash between the [Tule Lake] segregation camp bozu [shaved heads] and the military police officers [Border Patrol] reached its climax, and it finally ended with a sorry incident. Early that morning, Langston [phonetic], chief of the renraku [liaison office], escorted by several guards, inspected various buildings excluding the barracks and crafts room. As we were returning from our breakfast, from the mess hall, going to 'downtown area,' we encountered Tsuha and Tachibana, who were surrounded by guards and being escorted with their baggage to the uptown area. Many Tule Lake people were following them. There didn't seem to be any sign of violence, but when the internee group approached the 'uptown area,' they were met with dozens of guards who had been waiting for them. Suddenly, the guards threw tear-gas grenades, but the wind blew [the gas] back towards the guards, so the Tule Lake youths shouted for joy. This was the beginning of the incident. And the guards, carrying nightsticks [batons], chased the bozu group and tried to catch them by attacking them from both sides with other guards stationed near the entrance to the downtown area. The lower-area guards also threw tear-gas grenades, and all the guards started to hit the internees with sticks. Since the bozu group did not have any weapons to defend themselves, they fell down, one after another. Gontaro Ona, Akira Osuji, Isamu Uchida, Motoi Hirashima all suffered head injuries, and much blood was shed. The guards put these four into a truck and sent them to a hospital area, and I saw this kind of cruelty. And this incident took place within a second. (sic)

== Aftermath ==
According to Everett Rogers, the conflict was "shortlived and inconsequential." However, 350 of the internees were separated from the rest and put into a stockade, where they remained for several months, and seventeen others were sent to the internment camp at Fort Stanton. There was no further conflict at the camp, even after another 399 men from the Tule Lake Center were brought in.

Camp Santa Fe remained open after the war ended on September 2, 1945, to be used as a holding a processing center for the relocation of ethnic Japanese internees back to where they had come from . It was finally closed in May 1946 or sometime shortly thereafter. Today the site of the camp is occupied by a residential subdivision. At the Rosario Cemetery, located a half mile away from the camp site, there are graves for two of the men who died while interned. Furthermore, in 2002 a large boulder with a plaque telling about the camp was placed near the site as a memorial.
