= Outline of Japanese American Internment during World War II =

Outline of the internment of Japanese American during World War II

Japanese American internment
- Part of the United States home front during World War II
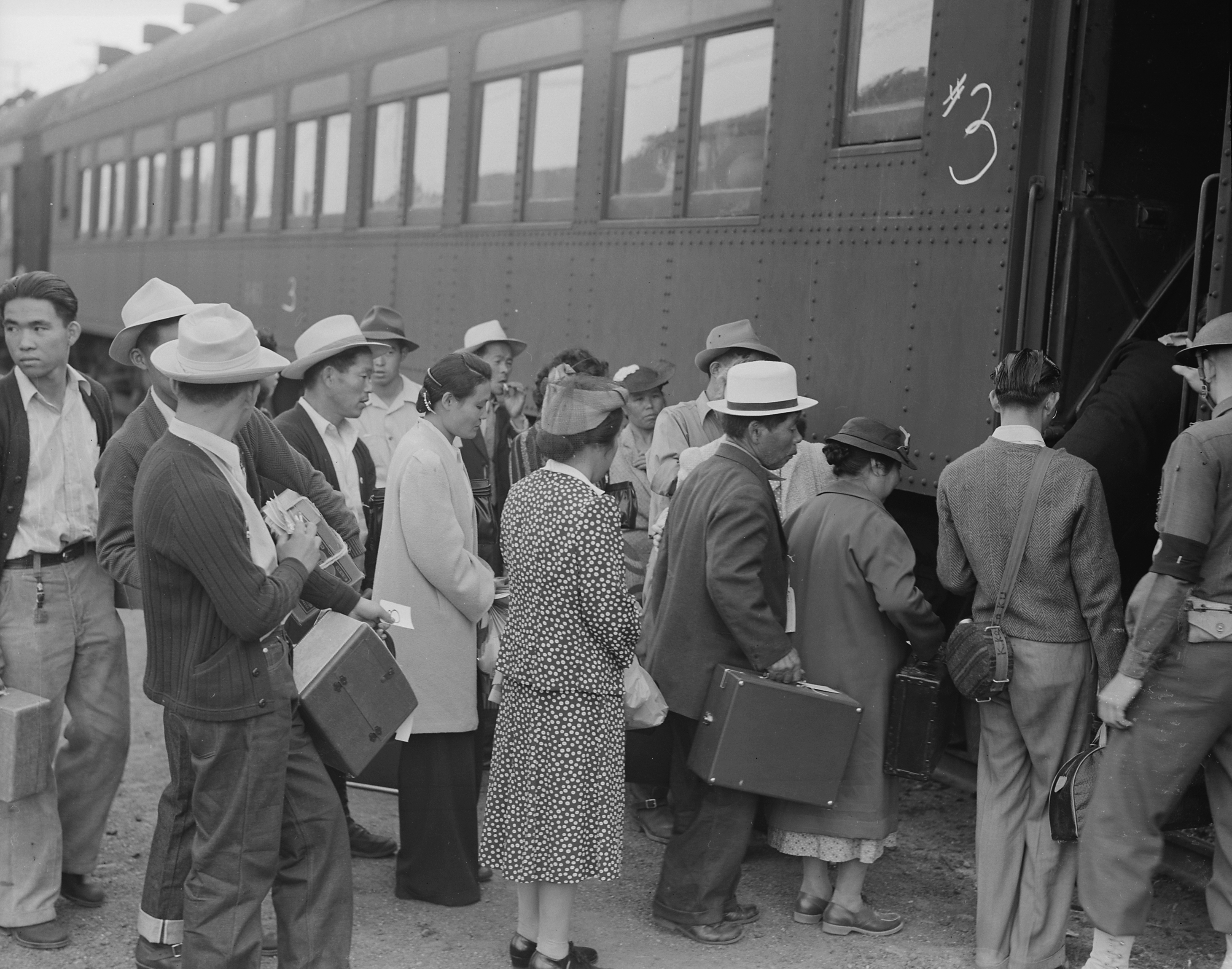
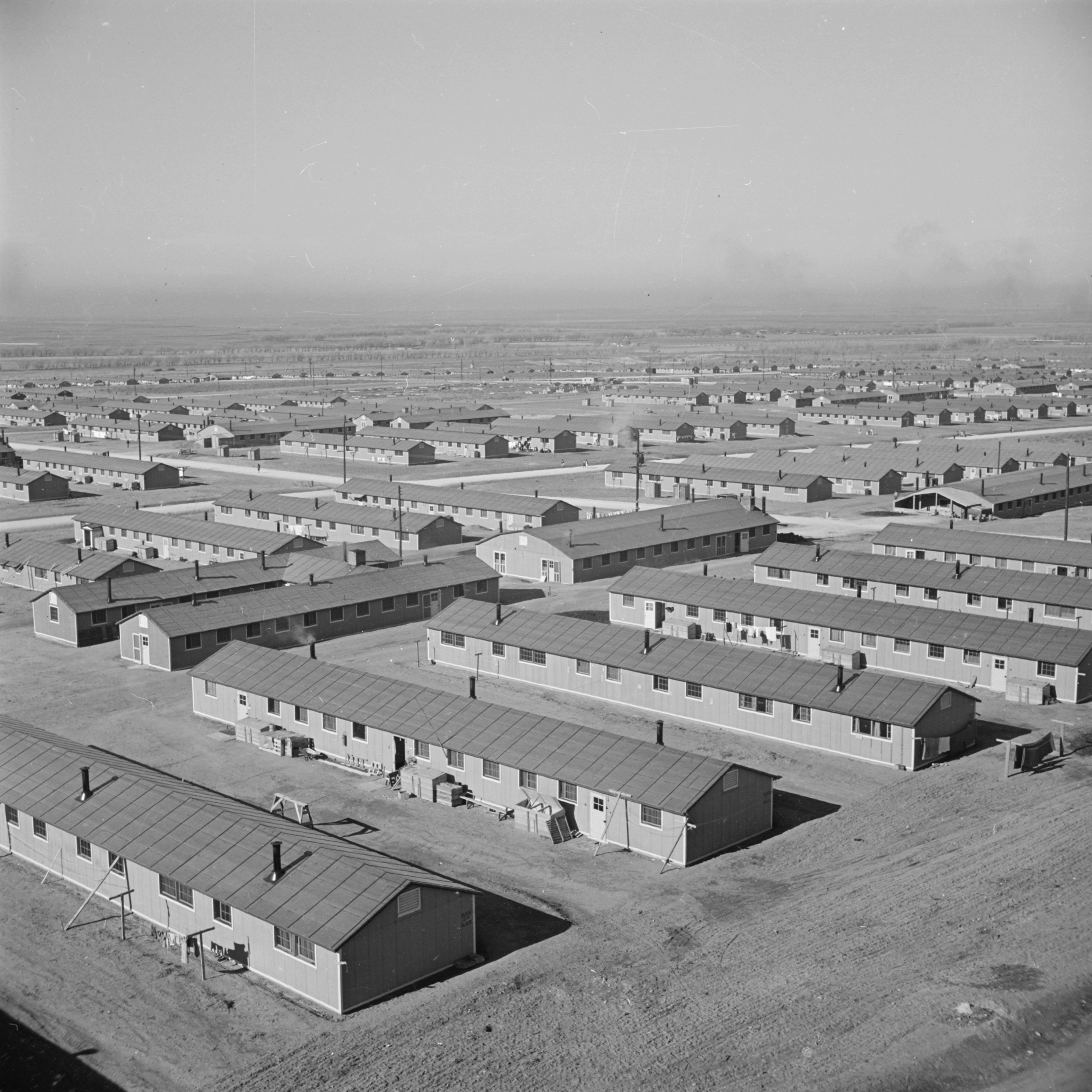
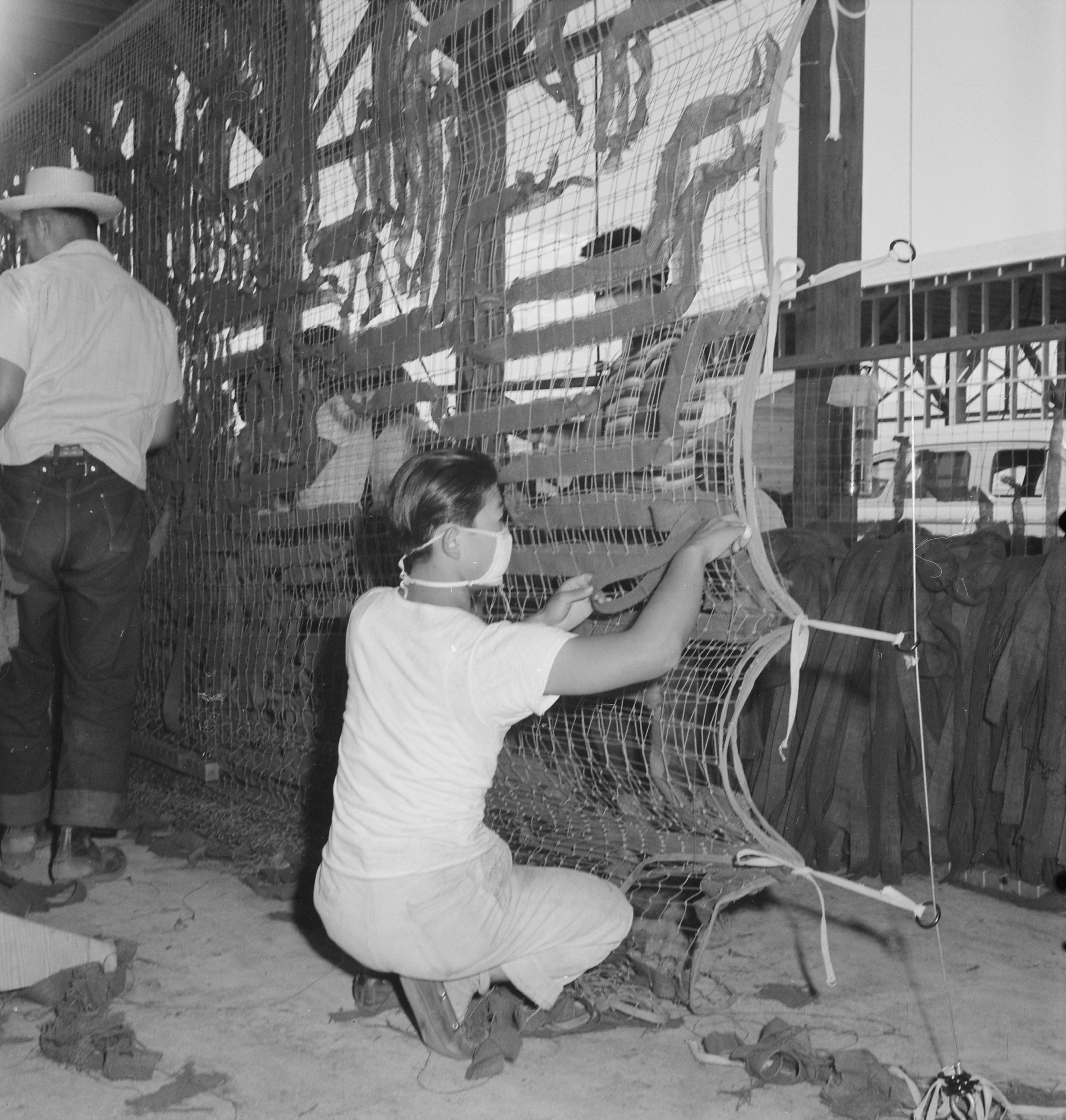
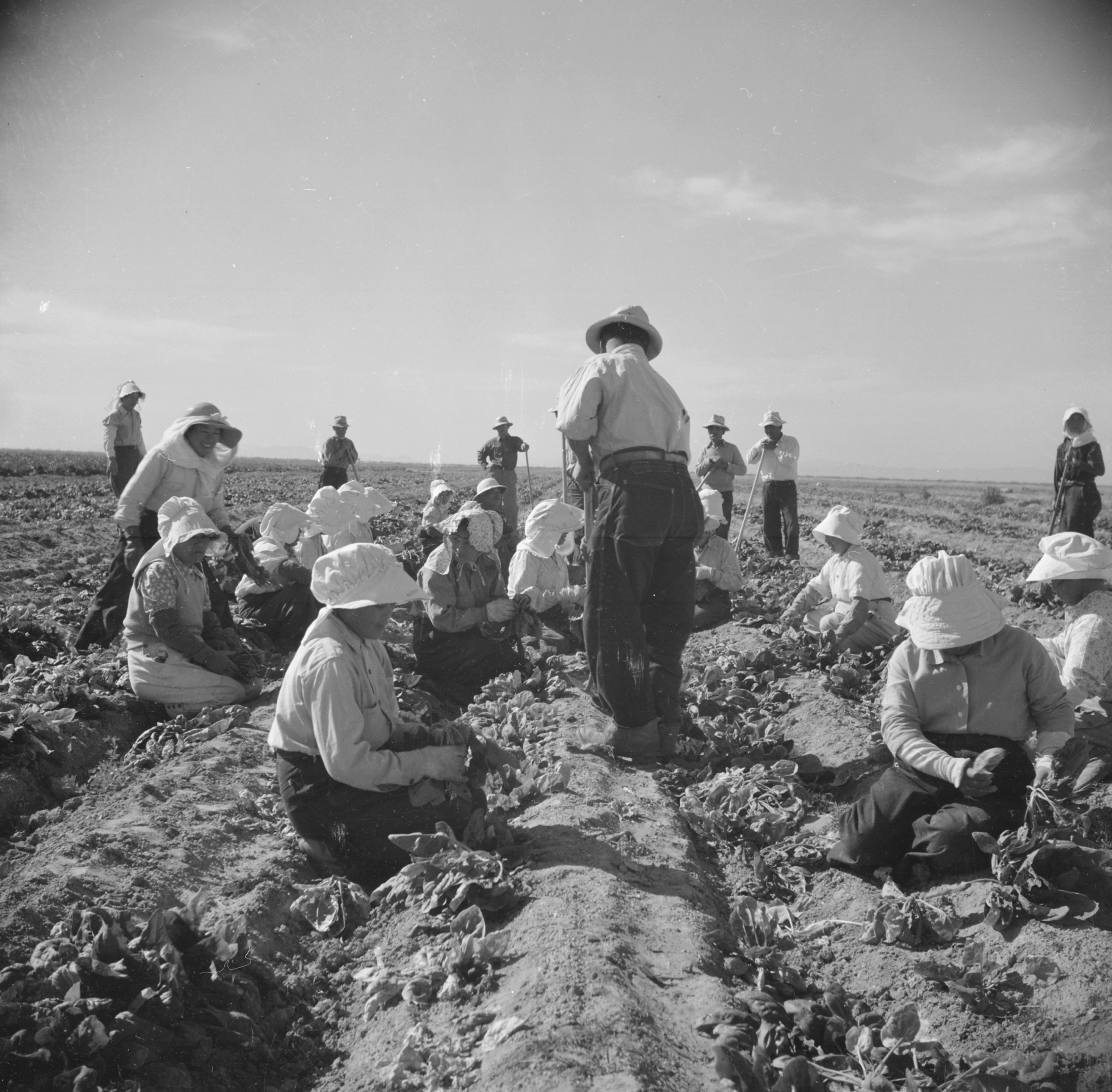
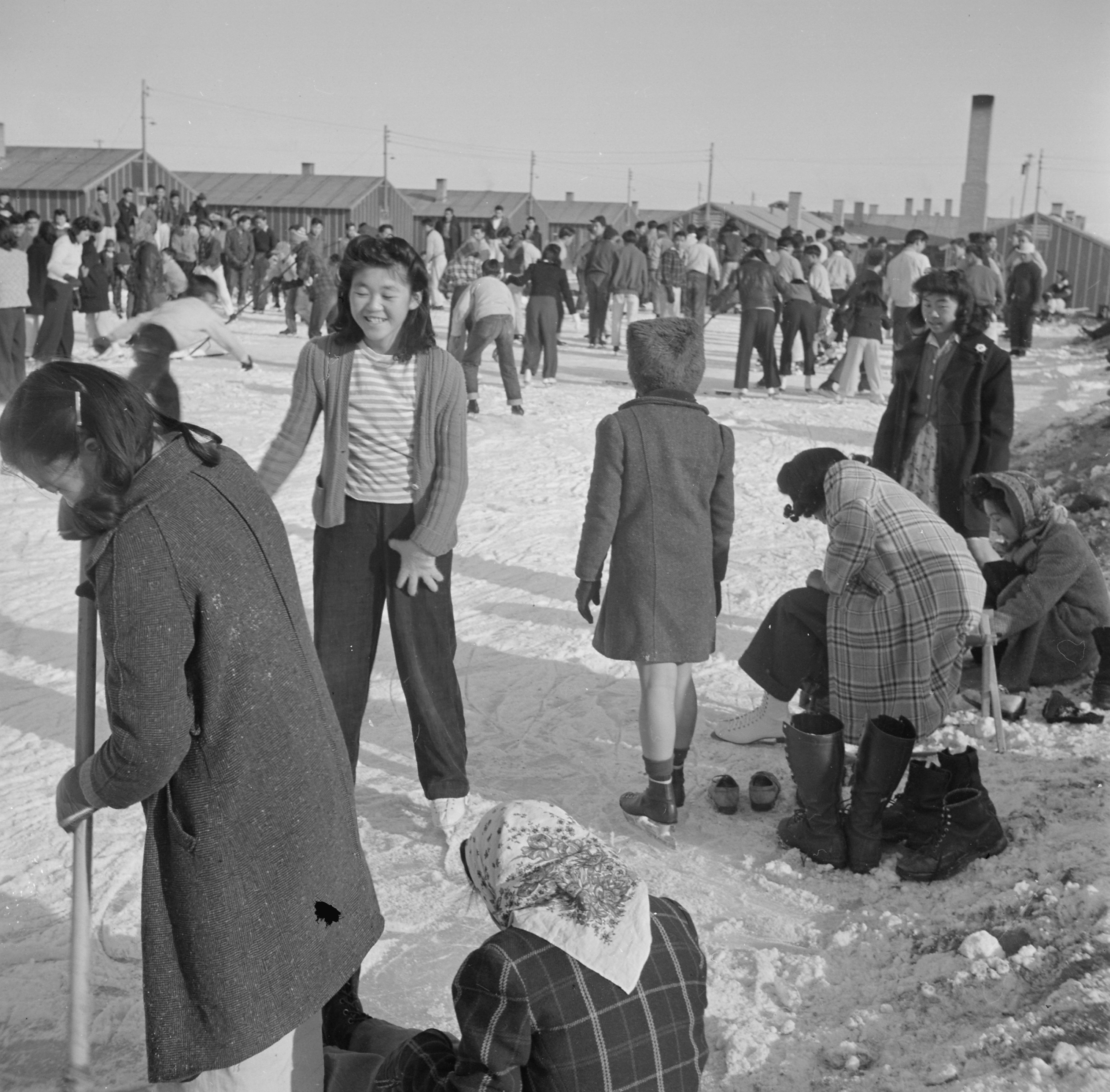
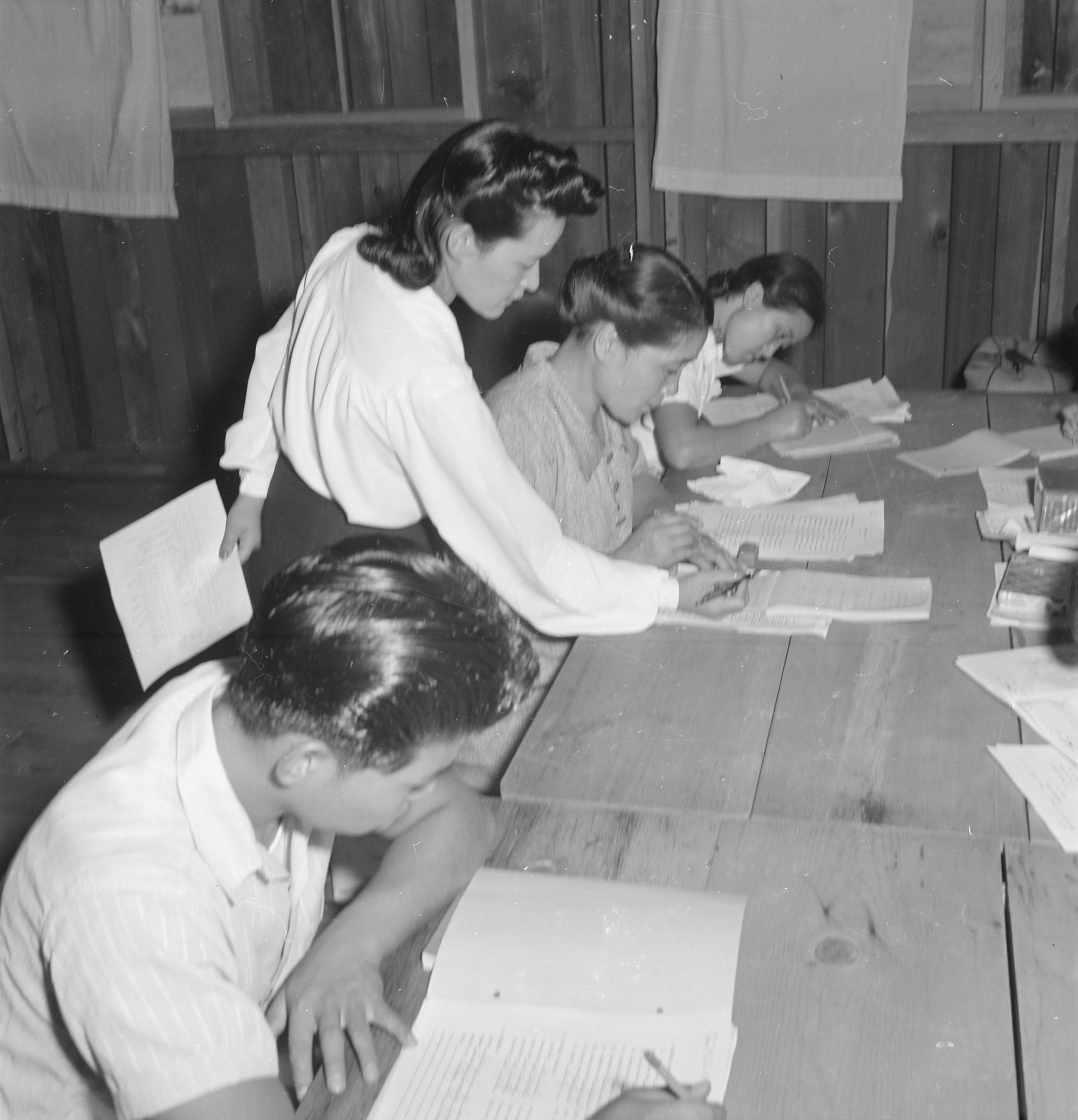
- Clockwise from top left: Boarding a train in Woodland, California; Granada Relocation Center in Colorado; Harvesting spinach at Gila River; Adults in class at Manzanar; Ice skating at Heart Mountain; Making camouflage nets for the War Department
- Date: February 19, 1942 – March 20, 1946
- Location: Western United States
- Cause: Executive Order 9066 signed by Franklin D. Roosevelt
- Motive: Anti-Japanese racism following the attack on Pearl Harbor.
- Perpetrators: United States federal government: California Governor Earl Warren; Lieutenant General John L. DeWitt
- Outcome: Partial financial compensation for lost property under the Japanese-American Claims Act of 1948 signed by Harry Truman; Formal apology and financial reparations given to surviving victims under the Civil Liberties Act of 1988 signed by Ronald Reagan
- Deaths: At least 1,862; at least 7 homicides by sentries.
- Inquiries: Commission on Wartime Relocation and Internment of Civilians (1983)
- Prisoners: 120,000 Japanese Americans living on the West Coast

This is a topical guide to articles about the history of the Japanese American internment during World War II.

During World War II, about 120,000 people of Japanese descent were forcibly relocated and incarcerated in ten internment camps in the United States, operated by the War Relocation Authority (WRA), mostly in the western interior of the country. About two-thirds were U.S. citizens. These actions were initiated by Executive Order 9066, issued by President Franklin D. Roosevelt on February 19, 1942, following Imperial Japan's attack on Pearl Harbor on December 7, 1941.

About 127,000 Japanese Americans then lived in the continental U.S., (Note: At the time of the internment, Hawaii was not a state, but the Territory of Hawaii; Hawaii became a state on August 21, 1959.) of whom about 112,000 were removed from the West Coast. About 80,000 were Nisei ('second generation'; American-born Japanese with U.S. citizenship) and Sansei ('third generation', the children of Nisei). The rest were Issei ('first generation') immigrants born in Japan, who were ineligible for citizenship. In Hawaii, where more than 150,000 Japanese Americans comprised more than one-third of the territory's population, only about 1,330 were incarcerated.

Most Japanese Americans were first held in temporary assembly centers, run by the Army's Wartime Civil Control Administration, before they were sent to internment camps in California, Arizona, Wyoming, Colorado, Utah, Idaho, and Arkansas. The internees were prohibited from taking more than they could carry into the camps, and many of them were forced to sell either some or all of their property, including their homes and their businesses.

== Overview ==
- Internment of Japanese Americans - (1942–1946) - The forced removal and imprisonment of about 120,000 people of Japanese ancestry, two-thirds of them American citizens, by the United States government during World War II.
- List of Japanese-American internment camps - List of sites used to hold Japanese Americans, from temporary assembly centers and the ten War Relocation Authority camps.

== Background ==
- World War II - Global conflict.
- Pearl Harbor (attack) - Beginning of the Pacific War, when the nation of Japan attacked military facilities in the Territory of Hawaii.
- Anti-Japanese sentiment in the United States - Hostility toward Japanese immigrants and their American-born children.
- Alien and Sedition Acts - (1798) - Four statutes of 1798, used as the legal basis for interning Japanese, German and Italian nationals during the Second World War.
- FBI Index - The Bureau's card-file system for tracking people it considered dangerous.
- Munson Report - (1941) - Curtis B. Munson's twenty-five-page survey for the State Department, delivered to the White House on October 7, 1941, which found no Japanese problem on the West Coast and reported extraordinary loyalty among the people it examined.
- Roberts Commissions - (1941–1942) - Presidential commissions chaired by Justice Owen Roberts.
- Niʻihau incident - (December 7–13, 1941) - The week after Pearl Harbor, a downed Japanese pilot on the Hawaiian island of Niʻihau was helped by two residents of Japanese ancestry.
- Black Dragon Society - Japanese ultranationalist group founded in 1901.
- Pacific Movement of the Eastern World - (founded c. 1932) - African American movement, started in Chicago, that looked to Japan as a champion of non-white peoples; the FBI sought a grand jury investigation of it in 1942.
- Propaganda for Japanese-American internment - The newsreels, films and newspaper campaigns.
- Shikata ga nai - Japanese phrase meaning "it cannot be helped," associated with how the incarcerated generation described enduring the camps.

== Enactment and administration ==
- Executive Order 9066 - (February 19, 1942) - Roosevelt's order, the legal foundation for the internment.
- Executive Order 9102 - (March 18, 1942) - Created the War Relocation Authority; Truman terminated it on June 26, 1946.
- War Relocation Authority - (1942–1946) - The civilian agency that ran the ten main camps.
- Western Defense Command - (1941–1946) - Army command responsible for Pacific Coast defense.
- Japanese Evacuation and Resettlement Study - (1942–1948) - Berkeley research project directed by sociologist Dorothy Swaine Thomas that tracked removal, camp life and resettlement.

== Places ==
=== Assembly centers ===
- Camp Harmony - (May–September 1942) - Puyallup, Washington
- Fresno Assembly Center - (May–October 1942) - Fresno, California
- Merced Assembly Center - (May 6 – September 15, 1942) - Merced, California
- Pomona Assembly Center - (May 7 – August 24, 1942) - Pomona, California
- Portland Expo Center - (May 2 – September 10, 1942) - Portland, Oregon
- Salinas Sports Complex - (April 27 – July 4, 1942) - Salinas, California
- Santa Anita Assembly Center - (March 27 – October 27, 1942) - Arcadia, California
- Tanforan Assembly Center - (April–October 1942) - San Bruno, California
- Tuna Canyon Detention Station - (December 1941 – October 1943) - Tujunga, California
- Sharp Park Detention Station - (1942–1946) - Pacifica, California

=== Internment camps ===
- Gila River War Relocation Center - (July 1942 – November 1945) - Gila River Indian Reservation, Pinal County, Arizona
- Granada War Relocation Center - (opened August 1942) - near Granada, Colorado, Prowers County
- Heart Mountain Relocation Center - (August 1942 – November 1945) - between Cody and Powell, Park County, Wyoming
- Jerome War Relocation Center - (October 1942 – June 1944) - near Jerome, Arkansas, Chicot and Drew counties
- Manzanar - (March 1942 – November 1945) - Owens Valley, Inyo County, California
- Minidoka National Historic Site - (1942–1945) - near Eden, Idaho, Jerome County, Idaho
- Poston War Relocation Center - (June 1942 – 1945) - Colorado River Indian Reservation, La Paz County, Arizona (then Yuma County)
- Rohwer War Relocation Center - (September 1942 – November 1945) - near McGehee, Arkansas, Desha County
- Topaz War Relocation Center - (September 1942 – October 1945) - near Delta, Utah, Millard County
- Tule Lake War Relocation Center - (May 1942 – March 1946) - Newell, California, Modoc County
- Manzanar Children's Village - (June 1942 – September 1945) - within Manzanar, Inyo County, California
- Poston Elementary School, Unit 1, Colorado River Relocation Center - (1940s) - Poston, Arizona, Colorado River Indian Reservation

=== Other ===
- Crystal City Internment Camp - (1943–1948) - Crystal City, Texas - Justice Department family camp for Japanese, German and Italian families, including Latin American deportees; 3,374 at its peak
- Fort Lincoln Internment Camp - (from April 1941) - Bismarck, North Dakota - Army post converted for enemy aliens; some 3,600 prisoners passed through
- Fort Missoula Internment Camp - (1941–1944) - Missoula, Montana - Held nearly 1,100 Italian and over 1,000 Japanese civilians
- Honouliuli National Historic Site - (1943–1946) - near Waipahu, Oahu - Hawaii's largest and longest-running camp, holding civilians and POWs
- Japanese internment at Ellis Island - (1941–1945) - Ellis Island, New York - Immigration station where New York's Japanese residents were held after Pearl Harbor
- Kilauea Military Camp - Hawaiʻi Volcanoes National Park, Hawaiʻi - Army post holding Japanese internees and POWs in the 1940s
- Kooskia Internment Camp - (1943–1945) - Idaho County, Idaho - Labor camp where 250+ Japanese men built what became U.S. Route 12
- Camp Livingston - (1940–1945) - near Pineville, Louisiana - Army post holding 800–1,100 Japanese American civilians alongside POWs
- Camp Tulelake - (1935–1946) - near Tulelake, California - Former CCC camp holding loyalty-questionnaire resisters, strikebreakers, then Axis POWs
- Dalton Wells Isolation Center - (1942–1943) - north of Moab, Utah - WRA isolation center for men labeled troublemakers, many from Manzanar
- Leupp, Arizona - (1943) - Navajo Nation, Arizona - Former boarding school used as an isolation center; its last 52 men were sent to Tule Lake
- Catalina Federal Honor Camp - (1939–1951) - Santa Catalina Mountains near Tucson - Fenceless prison camp holding 46 Japanese American men, mostly draft resisters, and Gordon Hirabayashi
- Seagoville, Texas - near Dallas, Texas - Women's reformatory used for Japanese, German and Italian internees and Latin American deportees; up to 647 held

== Life in internment camps ==
- Buddhist Temple of Chicago - (founded October 1944) - Founded by Rev. Gyomay Kubose with recently released prisoners.
- Cleveland Buddhist Temple - (founded 1944) - Jodo Shinshu congregation founded by resettlers in Cleveland.
- Heart Mountain Fair Play Committee - (1943–1944) - Draft resistance group; 85 men convicted, pardoned in 1947.
- Lordsburg killings - (July 27, 1942) - Guard shot two elderly internees, Toshio Kobata and Hirota Isomura, in the back; he was acquitted of manslaughter.
- Manzanar Guayule Project - (begun April 1942) - Rubber research program run by prisoners at Manzanar.
- Manzanar Riot - (December 5–6, 1942) - Military police fired on protesters, killing two.
- Minidoka Irrigator - (September 1942 – July 1945) - Camp newspaper at Minidoka.
- Renunciation Act of 1944 - (July 1, 1944) - Allowed wartime renunciation of citizenship on U.S. soil; used mainly at Tule Lake.
- Santa Fe riot - (March 12, 1945) - Guards attacked internees protesting three transfers, badly injuring four.
- Seabrook Buddhist Temple - (founded winter 1945) - Built by Japanese American workers at Seabrook Farms.
- Seabrook, New Jersey - Farming community where nearly 3,000 Japanese Americans resettled after the camps.
- Topaz Times - (September 1942 – August 1945) - Camp newspaper at Topaz.

== Legal challenges ==
- Hirabayashi v. United States - (1943) - Upheld Gordon Hirabayashi's conviction for violating the curfew on people of Japanese ancestry.
- Yasui v. United States - (1943) - Companion ruling affirming that the curfew applied to citizens; Minoru Yasui's conviction upheld.
- Korematsu v. United States - (1944) - 6–3 ruling upholding Fred Korematsu's conviction for defying exclusion; repudiated in Trump v. Hawaii (2018).
- Ex parte Endo - (1944) - Unanimous ruling that the government could not detain a citizen it conceded was loyal.
- Hirabayashi v. United States (1987) - (1987) - Ninth Circuit vacated Hirabayashi's wartime convictions after the government's suppression of evidence came to light.
- Mochizuki v. United States - (1998–1999) - Class action by interned Japanese Latin Americans; settled for $5,000 each and a presidential apology.
- Japanese-American Claims Act - (1948) - Property loss compensation; ~23,000 claims settled for roughly $38 million of $131 million claimed.

== People ==
- Karl Bendetsen - (1907–1989) - Army officer who drafted the removal plan and is generally named its architect
- Clara Breed - (1906–1994) - San Diego librarian who wrote to the children of her branch throughout their incarceration and lobbied on their behalf
- Ralph Lawrence Carr - (1887–1950) - Colorado governor who defended Japanese Americans' rights and welcomed them to his state, at the cost of his career
- Wayne M. Collins - (1899–1974) - San Francisco lawyer whose 23-year campaign restored the citizenship of the Tule Lake renunciants
- John L. DeWitt - (1880–1962) - General commanding the Western Defense Command, who issued the exclusion orders
- Milton S. Eisenhower - (1899–1985) - First director of the War Relocation Authority, who resigned after ninety days
- Mitsuye Endo - (1920–2006) - Her habeas petition won the ruling that the government could not hold citizens it conceded were loyal
- Bob Emmett Fletcher - (1911–2013) - Agricultural inspector who farmed three interned families' vineyards and handed back their share of the profits
- Julius Goldwater - (1908–2001) - Buddhist priest who safeguarded families' property, visited all ten camps and opened hostels for those returning
- Peter Irons - (born 1940) - Legal scholar whose archival research uncovered the suppressed evidence that reopened the wartime cases
- Estelle Ishigo - (1899–1990) - White American artist who followed her Japanese American husband to Heart Mountain and drew what she saw
- Lincoln Kanai - (1908–1982) - YMCA social worker jailed for refusing to report, and one of the few to challenge the orders in court
- Ralph Lazo - (1924–1992) - Los Angeles teenager who followed his friends into Manzanar and stayed two years
- Alexander H. Leighton - (1908–2007) - Social analyst whose fifteen months at Poston became The Governing of Men
- Mike Masaoka - (1915–1991) - JACL national secretary who urged cooperation with removal and pressed for Nisei military service
- Dale Minami - (born 1946) - Led the pro bono team that overturned Fred Korematsu's conviction in 1983
- Dillon S. Myer - (1891–1982) - Directed the War Relocation Authority from 1942 until it closed in 1946
- Joyce Nakamura Okazaki - (born 1934) - Held at Manzanar as a child and photographed there by Ansel Adams; later treasurer of the Manzanar Committee
- Culbert Olson - (1876–1962) - California governor who dropped his early opposition and endorsed mass removal
- Marvin Opler - (1914–1981) - Community analyst at Tule Lake who recorded both the camp's abuses and its cultural life
- Franklin D. Roosevelt - (1882–1945) - President who signed Executive Order 9066, authorizing the removal
- Earl Warren - (1891–1974) - California attorney general who pushed for removal and later said he regretted it
- Eric Yamamoto - Co-counsel on Korematsu's 1983 coram nobis petition and a leading scholar of redress

== Organizations ==
- Japanese American Citizens League - (founded 1929) - The oldest and largest Asian American civil rights group; its wartime leaders urged compliance with removal and helped the FBI identify Issei, decisions still contested
- Densho: The Japanese American Legacy Project - (founded 1996) - Seattle nonprofit whose free online archive gathers oral histories, photographs and documents from the incarceration
- Japanese American National Museum - (founded 1992) - Little Tokyo museum covering 130 years of Japanese American life, including a large archive of home movies

== Reparations ==
- Commission on Wartime Relocation and Internment of Civilians - (1980–1983) - Nine-member congressional panel that traced the incarceration to racial prejudice, wartime hysteria and a failure of political leadership
- Personal Justice Denied - (1983) - The commission's report, calling for a formal apology and payments to survivors
- Civil Liberties Act of 1988 - (August 10, 1988) - Reagan-signed law apologizing for the incarceration and paying $20,000 to each survivor; 82,219 received checks
- Day of Remembrance (Japanese Americans) - (since 1978) - Marked each February 19, the anniversary of Executive Order 9066; first held at the Puyallup fairgrounds in November 1978
- The Long Journey Home (ceremonial event) - (May 18, 2008) - University of Washington ceremony awarding honorary degrees to the 449 Japanese American students forced off campus in 1942

== Memorials, museums and historical sites ==
- Bainbridge Island Japanese American Exclusion Memorial - (opened 2011) - Marks the Eagle Harbor dock where 227 islanders, the first community removed, boarded a ferry on March 30, 1942; a unit of Minidoka National Historic Site
- Empty Chair Memorial - (dedicated 2014) - Bronze folding chair in Juneau for the town's 53 removed Japanese residents, recalling the valedictorian's empty seat at the 1942 graduation
- Go for Broke Monument - (dedicated June 5, 1999) - Little Tokyo monument to the Nisei who served in the U.S. Army, designed by Roger M. Yanagita
- Japanese American Memorial to Patriotism During World War II - (dedicated November 9, 2000) - Park Service memorial near the Capitol, centered on Nina Akamu's sculpture Golden Cranes
- Japanese American Internment Museum - (opened 2013) - Housed in McGehee's old railroad depot, interpreting the nearby Rohwer and Jerome camps
- Manzanar National Historic Site - (1992) - Designated in March 1992, seven years after Manzanar became a National Historic Landmark
- Minidoka National Historic Site - (2001, 2008) - Proclaimed a national monument by Clinton in 2001 and redesignated a historic site in 2008
- Amache National Historic Site - (2022, 2024) - Authorized by an act Biden signed in March 2022 and established as a park unit in February 2024
- Tule Lake National Monument - (2019) - Became its own monument in 2019, covering the segregation center and Camp Tulelake
- Honouliuli National Historic Site - (2015, 2019) - Proclaimed a national monument by Obama in 2015 and redesignated a historic site in 2019
- World War II Valor in the Pacific National Monument - (2008–2019) - Nine sites across Alaska, California and Hawaii, including Tule Lake, until Congress split it into three units
- Sakura Square - Denver plaza at 19th and Larimer with a Japanese garden and busts of Ralph Carr, Minoru Yasui and Yoshitaka Tamai

== See also ==
- Internment of Italian Americans
- Internment of German Americans
