= List of Japanese-American internment camps =

There were three types of camps for Japanese and Japanese-American civilians in the United States during World War II. Civilian Assembly Centers were temporary camps, frequently located at horse tracks, where Japanese Americans were sent as they were removed from their communities. Eventually, most were sent to Relocation Centers which are now most commonly known as internment camps or incarceration centers. Detention camps housed Nikkei considered to be disruptive or of special interest to the government.

== Civilian Assembly Centers ==
- Arcadia, California (Santa Anita Racetrack, stables) (Santa Anita assembly center)
- Fresno, California (Fresno Fairgrounds, racetrack, stables)
- Marysville / Arboga, California (migrant workers' camp)
- Mayer, Arizona (Civilian Conservation Corps camp)
- Merced, California (county fairgrounds)
- Owens Valley, California
- Parker Dam, Arizona
- Pinedale, California (Pinedale Assembly Center, warehouses)
- Pomona, California (Los Angeles County Fairgrounds, racetrack, stables) (Pomona assembly center)
- Portland, Oregon (Pacific International Livestock Exposition, including 3,800 housed in the main pavilion building)
- Puyallup, Washington (fairgrounds racetrack stables, Informally known as "Camp Harmony")
- Sacramento, California Camp Kohler (Site of Present-Day Walerga Park) (migrant workers' camp)
- Salinas, California (fairgrounds, racetrack, stables)
- San Bruno, California (Tanforan racetrack, stables)
- Stockton, California (San Joaquin County Fairgrounds, racetrack, stables)
- Tulare, California (fairgrounds, racetrack, stables)
- Turlock, California (Stanislaus County Fairgrounds)
- Woodland, California

== Relocation Centers ==
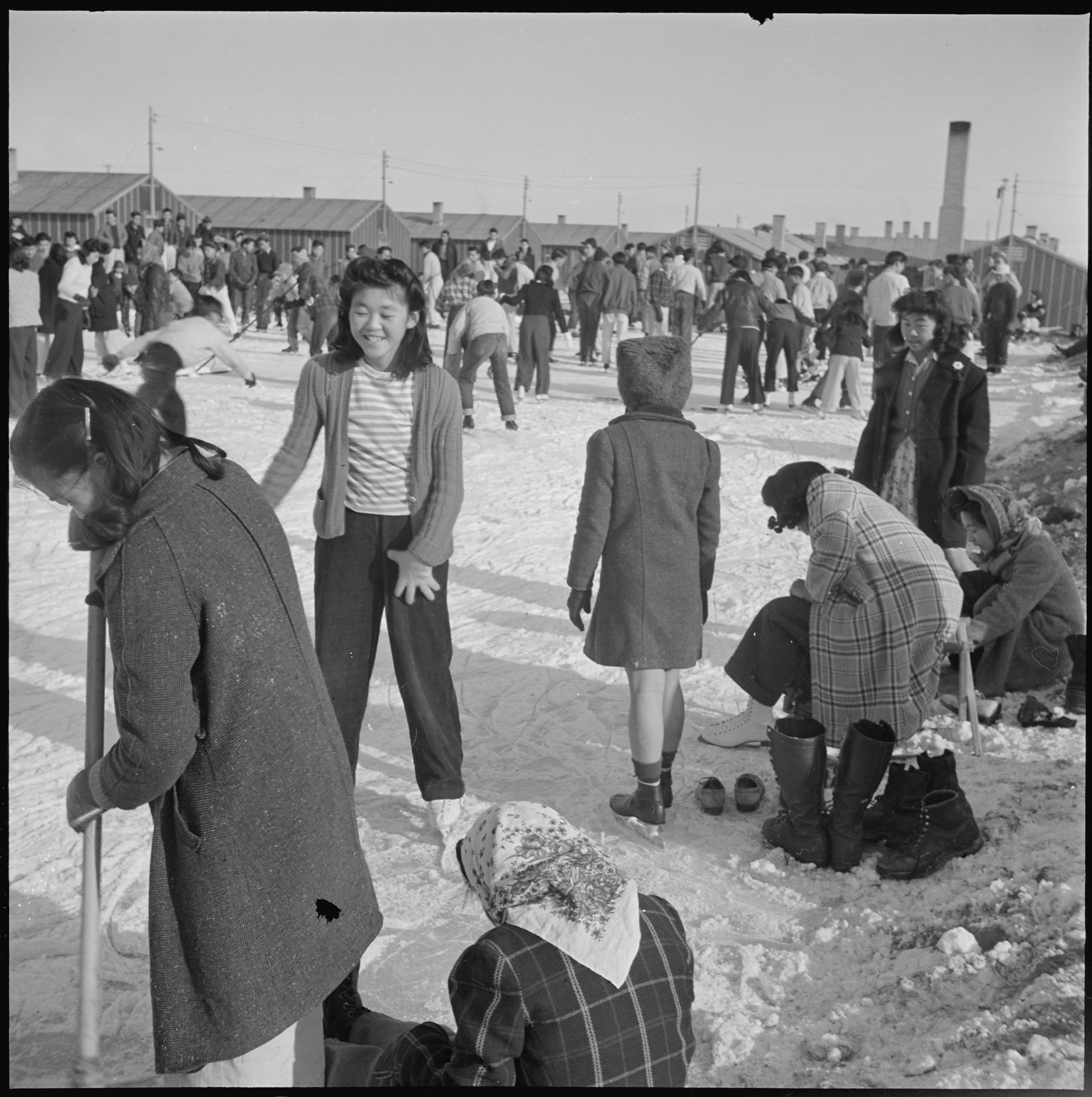
Heart Mountain Relocation Center, January 10, 1943

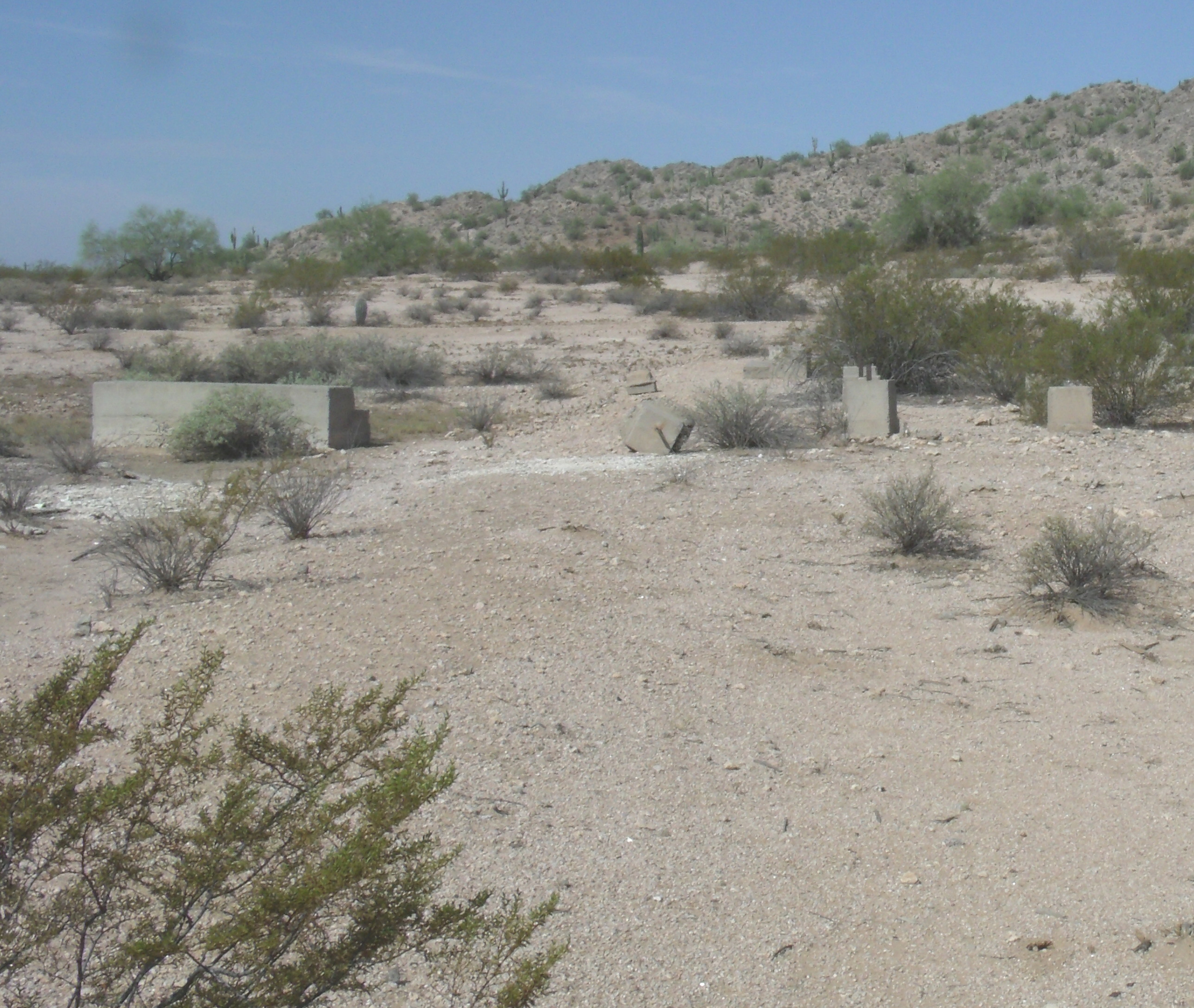
Ruins of the buildings in the Gila River War Relocation Center of Camp Butte

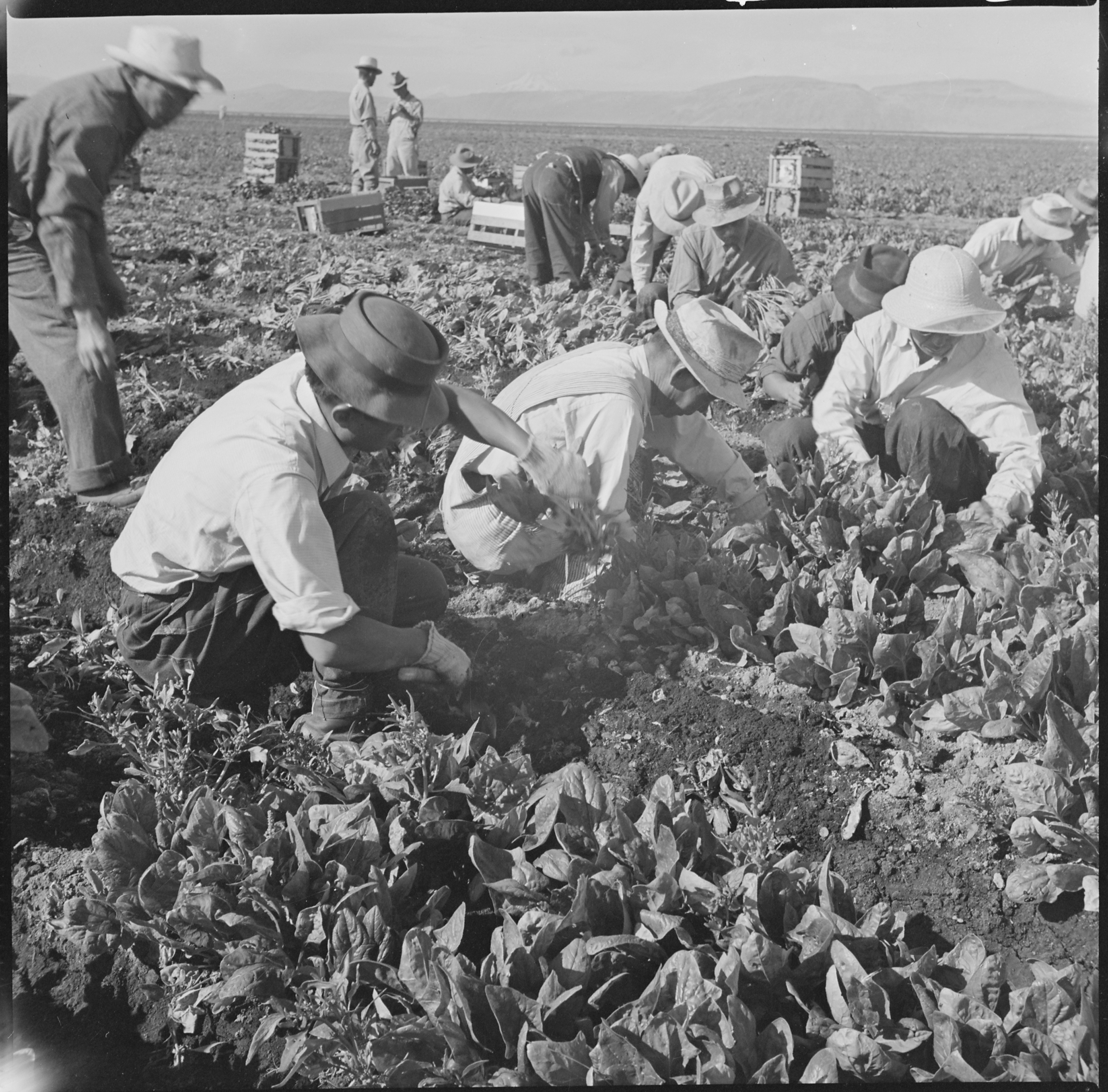
Harvesting spinach. Tule Lake Relocation Center, September 8, 1942

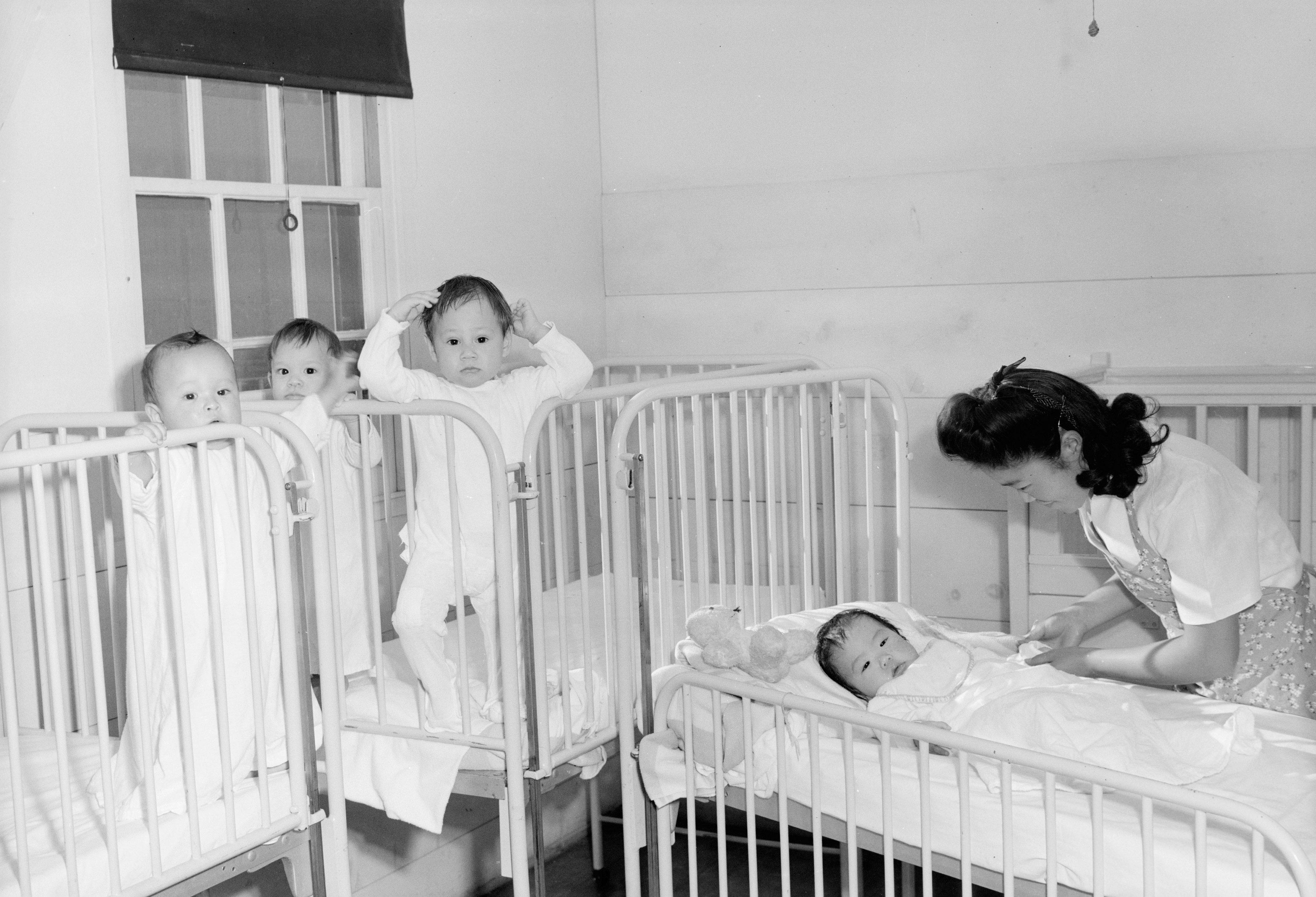
Nurse tending four orphaned babies at the Manzanar Children's Village

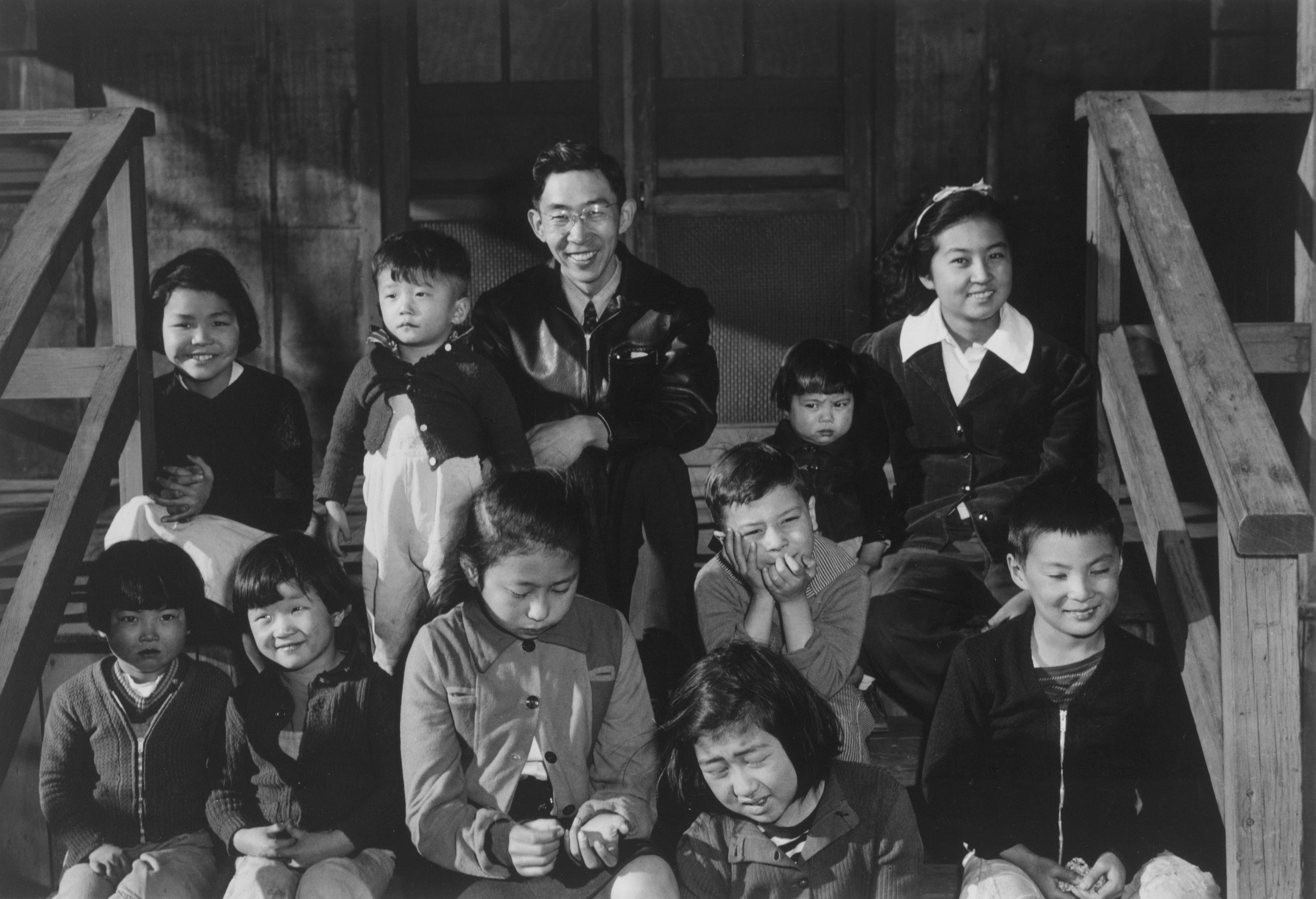
Manzanar Children's Village superintendent Harry Matsumoto with several orphan children

- Gila River War Relocation Center, Arizona
- Granada War Relocation Center, Colorado (AKA "Amache")
- Heart Mountain War Relocation Center, Wyoming
- Jerome War Relocation Center, Arkansas
- Manzanar War Relocation Center, California
- Minidoka War Relocation Center, Idaho
- Poston War Relocation Center, Arizona
- Rohwer War Relocation Center, Arkansas
- Topaz War Relocation Center, Utah
- Tule Lake War Relocation Center, California

== Justice Department detention camps ==
These camps often held German-American and Italian-American detainees in addition to Japanese Americans:

- Crystal City, Texas
- Fort Lincoln Internment Camp
- Fort Missoula, Montana
- Fort Stanton, New Mexico
- Kenedy, Texas
- Kooskia, Idaho
- Santa Fe, New Mexico
- Seagoville, Texas
- Forest Park, Georgia

== Citizen Isolation Centers ==
The Citizen Isolation Centers were for those considered to be problem inmates.

- Leupp, Arizona
- Moab, Utah (AKA Dalton Wells)
- Fort Stanton, New Mexico (AKA Old Raton Ranch)

== Federal Bureau of Prisons ==
Detainees convicted of crimes, usually draft resistance, were sent to these sites, mostly federal prisons:

- Catalina, Arizona
- Fort Leavenworth, Kansas
- McNeil Island, Washington

== U.S. Army facilities ==
These camps often held German and Italian detainees in addition to Japanese Americans:

- Fort McDowell/Angel Island, California
- Camp Blanding, Florida
- Camp Forrest, Tennessee
- Camp Livingston, Louisiana
- Camp Lordsburg, New Mexico
- Camp McCoy, Wisconsin
- Florence, Arizona
- Fort Bliss, New Mexico and Texas
- Fort Howard, Maryland
- Fort Lewis, Washington
- Fort Meade, Maryland
- Fort Richardson, Alaska
- Fort Sam Houston, Texas
- Fort Sill, Oklahoma
- Griffith Park, California
- Honouliuli Internment Camp, Hawaiʻi
- Sand Island, Hawaiʻi
- Stringtown, Oklahoma

== Immigration and Naturalization Service facilities ==
These immigration detention stations held the roughly 5,500 men arrested immediately after Pearl Harbor, in addition to several thousand German and Italian detainees, and served as processing centers from which the men were transferred to DOJ or Army camps:

- East Boston Immigration Station
- Ellis Island
- Cincinnati, Ohio
- San Pedro, Los Angeles
- Seattle, Washington
- Sharp Park, California
- Tuna Canyon, Los Angeles

== See also ==
- Bibliography of the Japanese American Internment during World War II
- Outline of Japanese American Internment during World War II
- Internment of Japanese Americans
