= Sei Fujii =

Activist for human rights of Japanese-Americans

Sei Fujii (藤井 整, 1882–1954) was a human rights activist for Japanese-American individuals. He also established a California daily newspaper in 1931.

== Life ==
Sei Fujii was born in Shūtō, Japan (as of 2013, Yamaguchi). After dropping out of Yamaguchi High School in the old system, he moved to the United States in 1903. He studied law at the University of Southern California and graduated from USC Gould School of Law. However, he was unable to get a law license because of a law that prohibited foreign-born aliens who were a member of the "Mongolian race" from obtaining U.S. citizenship, and in turn, without citizenship, he was unable to acquire a law license. (The U.S. Supreme Court did not overturn restrictions on admission to the bar to U.S. citizens as unconstitutional until 1973.) After this, he started to fight against discrimination for Japanese immigrants with his friend J. Marion Wright, a lawyer in California. In 1928, the Supreme Court permitted Japanese-Americans to establish hospitals in Los Angeles.

In 1942, following the Japanese attack on Pearl Harbor, Fujii was arrested by the FBI and imprisoned at the Tuna Canyon Detention Station. He was then sent to an Immigration and Naturalization detention camp in Santa Fe, New Mexico and, later, an Army internment facility in Lordsburg, New Mexico. Fujii was not released until 1946.

Several years after the war ended, the California Alien Land Law of 1913 was struck down, giving Japanese immigrants the ability to purchase land. In 1952, the law limiting citizenship was judged unconstitutional, and Fujii was finally able to acquire his citizenship at the age of 73. "He died by heart attack 51 days later," according to the Los Angeles Times.

== "Lil Tokyo Reporter" ==
In 2012, the narrative short film "Lil Tokyo Reporter," an independent film about the activities and advocacy of Fujii in the fight for Japanese-American human rights, was produced in the US. The film was exhibited at the Los Angeles Asian Pacific Film Festival and won more than 18 awards in various parts of the US. It was directed by Jeffrey Gee Chin, a Chinese-American, and starred Japanese-American Actor Chris Tashima as Fujii.

== "Sei Fujii Memorial Lantern" ==
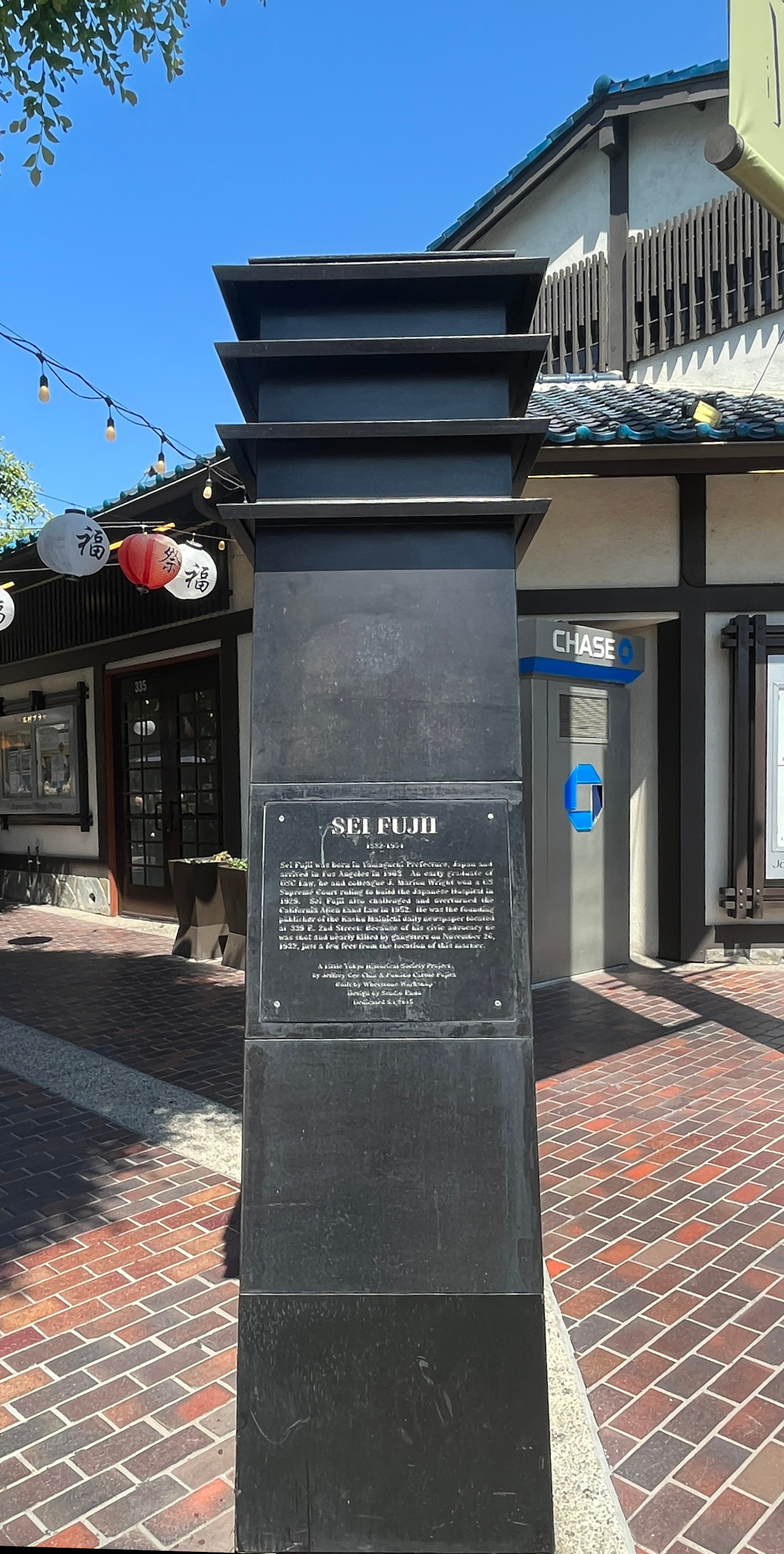
"Sei Fujii Memorial Lantern"

In August 2015, Little Tokyo Historical Society unveiled a memorial lantern honoring Issei Pioneer Sei Fujii. The lantern was designed by Miles Endo whose grandfather Shiroichi Koyama was detained at the same Santa Fe Department of Justice Camp as Sei Fujii. The project was funded by generous donations by the community.

== Law license after his death ==
In 2017, California's top court decided unanimously to grant him a law license 63 years after his death. According to the lawyer in the case, there are only a few cases of individuals being granted law licenses posthumously; the Los Angeles Times reported a similar case involving a Chinese immigrant.

== Historic Designation of Japanese Hospital ==
The historic Japanese Hospital was established in 1929 Japanese Hospital, located on 101 S. Fickett. In 2016, the Little Tokyo Historical Society (LTHS) members Kristen Hayashi and Michael Okamura submitted a nomination for a City of Los Angeles Historic Cultural Monument designation. In 2019, was designated City of Los Angeles Historic Cultural Monument #1131.

== "A Rebel's Outcry: Biography of Issei Civil Rights Leader Sei Fujii (1882-1954)" ==
In 2021, Little Tokyo Historical Society published a book entitled "A Rebel's Outcry: Biography of Issei Civil Rights Leader Sei Fujii (1882-1954)". The biography is based on the official biography written in 1983 known as "Rafu Gigyu Ondo" by Kenichi Sato. The text was translated by Saeko Higa-Dickinson, edited by Naomi Hirahara, original artwork by Takashi Uchida, and layouts by Amy Inouye. Jeffrey Gee Chin and Fumiko Carole Fujita are named the publishers. The book incorporated historical photographs, articles, and artwork uncovered by the publishers over a ten year period. The official release was on November 2, 2021 at the Japanese American Cultural & Community Center in Little Tokyo, Los Angeles. Present was the grand-daughter of attorney J. Marion Wright, Alice LaMoree and her sons, and the daughter of attorney Owen Kupfer, Coralie Kupfer.

A subsequent event was hosted in San Francisco on December 2, 2021 at the Japanese Cultural and Community Center of Northern California. On the panel was civil rights advocate Karen Korematsu, Kenji Taguma, Jeffrey Gee Chin, and Miya Iwataki (Master of Ceremonies).

== See also ==
- Racism in the United States#Asian Americans
