= Manzanar Guayule Project =

Horticulture project

The Manzanar Guayule Project began in April 1942, in the Manzanar internment camp. The objective of the project was to produce a domestic source of rubber after the Axis powers had gained control of areas that supplied rubber from Hevea braziliensis. The project was operated by California Institute of Technology (Caltech) scientists and led by Robert Emerson. Japanese Americans made up the primary workforce and were responsible for the successes and achievements of the project. Several scientific articles on guayule were published as a result. The project was ended by government order towards the end of World War II along with other similar projects like the Salinas project.

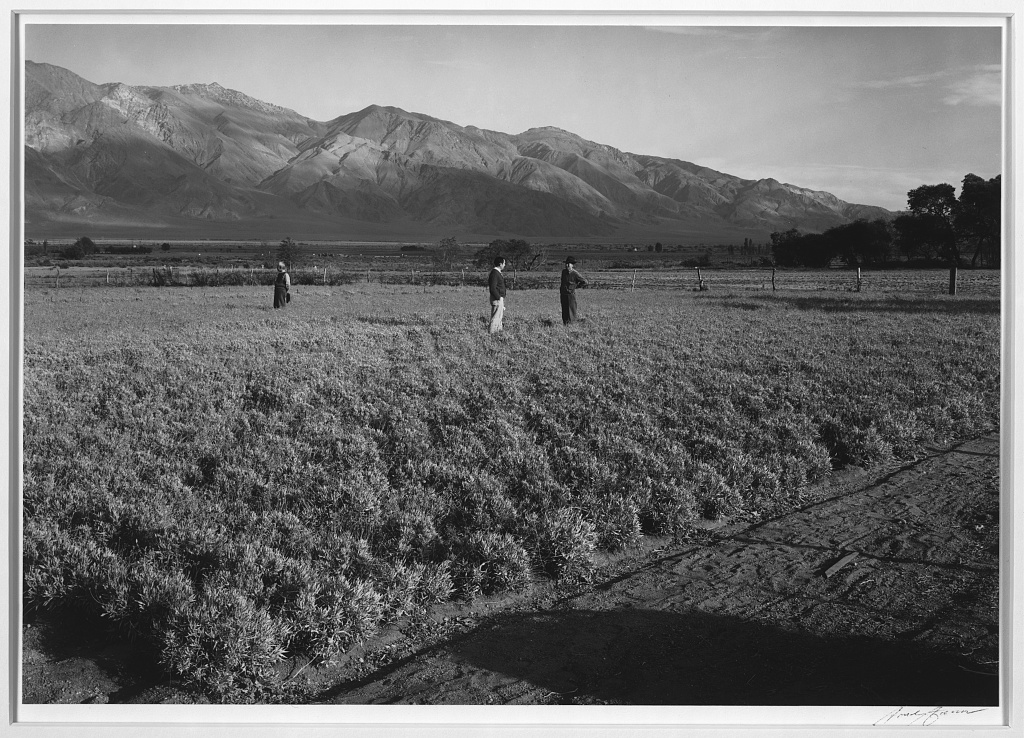
Three workers in a Manzanar guayule field.

== Project background ==
Because of the Axis powers gaining control of areas that supplied rubber from Hevea braziliensis, there was a nationwide rubber shortage and a need for more rubber from an alternative source. Guayule was seen as a potential way to eventually solve the rubber shortage of the country. In response to this crisis, the US government created the Emergency Rubber Project (ERP) which then planted seventy-five thousand acres of guayule and obtained all US assets of the Intercontinental Rubber Company. Caltech scientists had previous contracts with the Intercontinental Rubber Company but these dissolved after the creation of the ERP. This caused Caltech scientists to begin their own project independent of the ERP, Wartime Civil Control Administration (WCCA), and the War Relocation Authority (WRA).

Caltech scientist Robert Emerson, wanted the assistance of Japanese Americans so that their talents would not go to waste in the camps and so that they could help prove their loyalty to the USA.

== Japanese-American involvement ==
The involvement of Japanese Americans in the Manzanar Guayule Project is one of its main reasons behind its success. While the Department of Agriculture's main operation for mass producing guayule rubber was centered in Salinas, California; a collective of Japanese American scientists, in partnership with Caltech professor Robert Emerson, formed a separate research team at Manzanar with the intent of genetically engineering new strands of the plant to improve the yields and quantity of rubber produced with each batch. Despite little initial government support, with most government funding and support going to the project in Salinas, the Manzanar team developed a source of rubber that produced a higher yield than that of tree rubber or the rubber plants that resulted from the Salinas Project. This rubber the Manzanar team developed also had a tensile strength stronger than that of tree rubber and Salinas-developed rubber with Manzanar-developed rubber being 1,450 pounds per square inch (PSI) stronger than Salinas-developed rubber and 750 PSI stronger than tree rubber.

Japanese-American scientists who participated in the project included Shimpe "Morganlander" Nishimura, a physicist and Emerson collaborator; geneticist Masuo Kodani; and chemist Kenzie Nozaki. A number of talented nurserymen, such as Frank Kageyama (brother of Mary Kageyama Nomura, the famed "songbird of Manzanar"), helped with the everyday operations of the lab. Another friend of Robert Emerson's, Hugh Anderson, frequented the lab and provided materials for the project.

== Issues and challenges faced ==
From the very beginning, the project faced many issues and challenges. The Manzanar team had very little funding and would have to make do with makeshift labs compared to the thirty-seven million dollars in funding and the professionally-made labs their counterparts in Salinas, California received from the U.S government. The team would also face water being shut off to their greenhouses in 1942 due to pressure the government received from official related to the Salinas project like Fred McCargar. McCargar persuaded government officials into believing that Japanese forces and spies were looking to get their hands on guayule seeds and that the work done in Manzanar was part of a ploy to help get Japanese Americans their land and property back despite the exclusion orders of the time.

In addition to the water being shut down, this pressure from McCargar pushed government officials to quickly stop cooperating with the Manzanar team. WRA officials would prohibit Grace Nichols' article on the Manazanar Project and strip Emerson of the permissions that allowed him to work on campgrounds due to this pressure. These issues and hurdles to the project's continued existence would spur Emerson and others to lobby several members of government in Washington, D.C., for greater support and funding. This lobbying worked and ensured the project's continued existence and additional manpower. This, however, did not provide them with the same level of government support and funding that the Salinas project had as members of the team still had to salvage parts from washing machines and cars to create better and stronger rubber mills.

== Shutdown and results ==
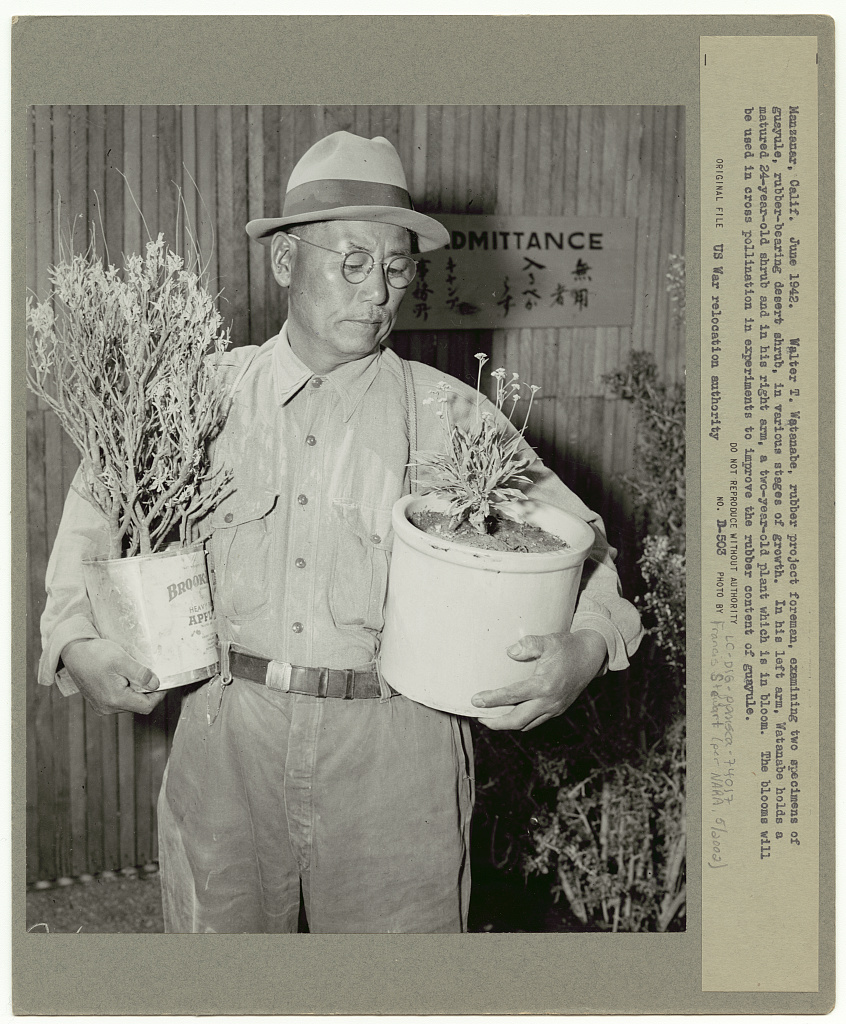
Walter T. Watanabe holding two pots of guayule plants for a research project to produce rubber for the war effort at the concentration camp where Japanese Americans were incarcerated during World War II.

Despite the efforts of Emerson and others being largely successful in regaining government funding for the project, the project would be shut down and eventually fade into obscurity. A large variety of reasons are to blame for the shutting down of the Manzanar Guayule Project from big to small. By this time, several researchers had left the project, either by moving to a different camp or by having found other work or research opportunities. By 1944, the war already shifted in favor of the Allies with domestic affairs in the U.S reflecting this change. Several Western Defense Command officials at this point were advocating an end to Japanese-American exclusion from the West Coast. President Franklin D. Roosevelt would officially rescind any general exclusion orders prohibiting Japanese-Americans from the West Coast with Public Proclamation Number 21 on December 17, 1944. This would be followed by the Manzanar internment camp closing down on November 21, 1945, with many internees leaving the camp prior to then.

After the war, the project's research team would face even more issues to any continuation of the project as pressures from rubber exporters and the shutdown of the ERP by President Harry S. Truman made any continued research into Guayule harder and harder to do. While other ERP projects such as that at Salinas, California would be shut down and have all results from it classified, the independent nature of the research team at Manzanar meant that the results from the Manazar Guayule Project could be published. Such results were published by members of the team in the Journal of Botany and the Journal of Heredity in 1944 and the journal Industrial Engineering and Chemistry later in 1947.
