= Dalton Wells Isolation Center =

American internment camp in Utah

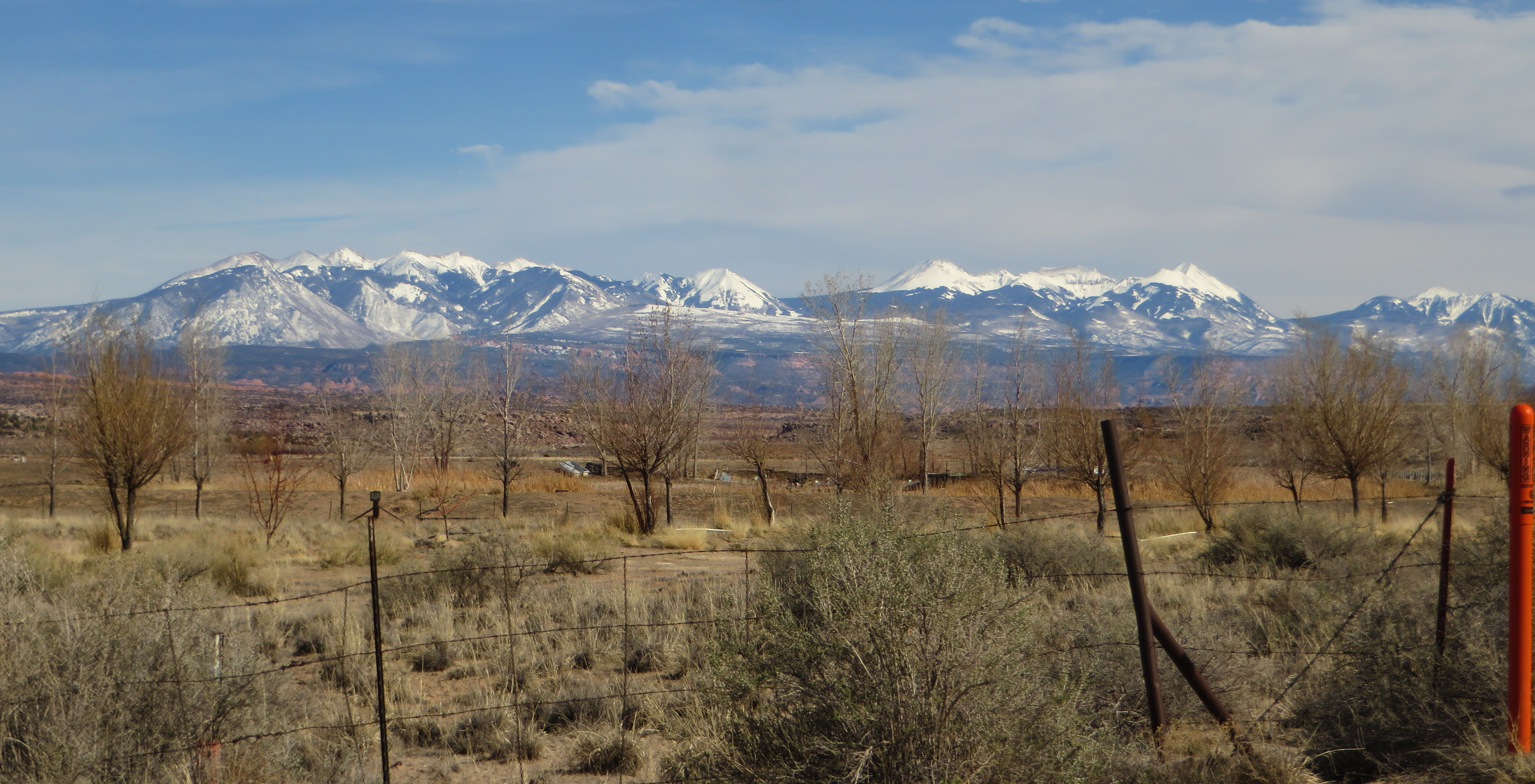
A modern photograph of the LaSal Mountains from Dalton Wells.

Dalton Wells Isolation Center was an American internment camp located in Moab, Utah. The Dalton Wells camp was in use from 1935 to 1943. The camp played a role in two significant events during the twentieth century. During the New Deal programs under President Franklin D. Roosevelt, the camp was built as a CCC camp to provide jobs for young men. Starting in 1942 after the attack on Pearl Harbor and the beginning of World War II, the camp was used as a relocation and isolation center (also known as a concentration camp) for Japanese Americans. The camp never housed large numbers of Japanese Americans since the camp's function was only to house internees deemed "troublemakers" from other relocation camps after problematic events such as the Manzanar riot. Some consider the camp illegal because it was not authorized by Executive Order 9066.

== Background ==
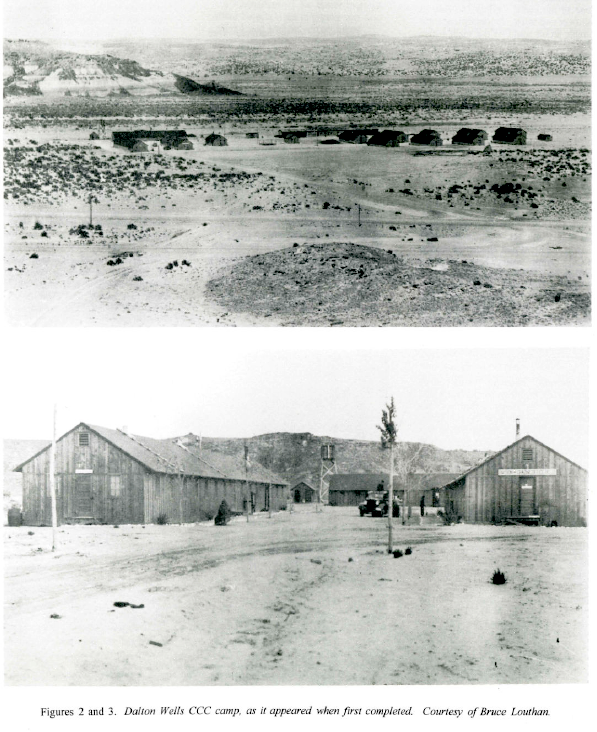
The Dalton Wells CCC Camp before conversation

=== CCC camp ===
The Dalton Wells CCC camp (also known as Camp DG-32) was one of four CCC camps created in Grand County, Utah. Its construction began in July 1935 and was completed in October of that year. Situated fourteen miles north of Moab, the camp operated until 1942. The camp housed a maximum of 200 young men at a time. In 1943, it became the Moab Relocation Center for the Incarceration of Japanese Americans.

CCC camps were begun in 1933 under the administration of Franklin D. Roosevelt. These camps provided opportunities for young men to gain education and benefit local communities through public service during the Great Depression. Activities in the camp were also meant to benefit and improve local communities. Young men would spend six months at the camp learning various subjects at a high school level, and some would graduate high school at the camps. They came from all over the country to various Camps, including the Dalton Wells Camp.

Young Men at Camp DG-32 would learn practical skills from classes on topics such as Auto Mechanics and Business Law. They also had classes on life skills such as citizenship and cooking. These classes were offered in the evening after the workday was completed. During their workday, enrollees worked under the direction of the Division of Grazing to improve farmland, build wells, create trails, and remove rodents that grazed the food of cattle and sheep. The work of young men from the DG-32 camp contributed greatly to the economy of Grand County.

=== Japanese relocation ===
Before the attack on Pearl Harbor and the United States' involvement in World War II, there was already present disdain and discrimination against the Japanese race. Executive Order 9066 was issued on February 19, 1942, just over two months after the Pearl Harbor attack. This Authorized the mass forced removal and incarceration of all Japanese Americans on the West Coast. The government encouraged a voluntary evacuation followed by forced incarceration in various relocation centers across the American West.

== During World War II ==
=== Conversion to an isolation center ===
Dalton Wells was not one of the original relocation camps sanctioned on the West Coast for the incarceration of Japanese Americans. As previously mentioned, the relocation of the Japanese Americans began in February 1942, however, Dalton Wells remained empty until December of that same year. In the months following the beginning of the incarceration, contention began to build between the internees and the guards and personnel of the several different camps across the West. After a number of these attacks, the WRA or the War Relocation Authority decided to establish special prison-like camps for the internees deemed "troublemakers." The federally owned CCC camp at Dalton Wells had remained empty since the beginning of the war, and in early December 1942, the camp was considered as a possible location for an isolation center following the Manzanar riot in California. E.R. Fryer, a regional director of the War Relocation Authority, made the arrangements for Dalton Wells to be converted to a concentration camp. WRA-employed Raymond R. Best was assigned to be the director of the camp, and Frances Frederick was the chief of internal security. Frederick would assume leadership frequently as Best was often not present at the camp.

The local newspaper, Times-Independent of Moab, announced to locals that internees would be sent to the Dalton Wells CCC camp. The article expressed that up to 200 individuals would be kept there and that their families would eventually be allowed to join them. It also presented the possibility that the men would eventually be permitted to take on projects around the camp. However, the Dalton Wells camp only held a maximum of 49 men at one time and their families did not join them during their brief time at the camp.

=== Physical facilities ===
As a CCC camp, the facilities of Dalton Wells consisted of 18 buildings, most of which were 20 feet in length although some were as long as 100 feet. The headquarters building was placed closest to the road leading to the camp, with facilities on the east side of the camp, and bunkers on the south. The buildings were made from wood and had tar paper roofs and windows. Minimal repairs to the existing facilities from the CCC camp may have been completed before the arrival of the first group of internees from Manzanar. Historians dispute whether or not repairs were made, and whether a fence was erected around the facilities.

=== Manzanar riot, Harry Ueno, and relocation to Moab ===
Many of the internees at Dalton Wells came from Manzanar, the first Japanese American concentration camp, located in California. An internee, Harry Ueno¸ a leader in the Mess Hall Worker's Union at Manzanar, was convicted for beating Fred Tayama, the leader of the Japanese American Citizens League. Protests for Harry Ueno began, and a riot broke out in which two were killed and ten were wounded. Twenty-six men were sent to jail for inciting the riot, including Ueno. The men were not indicated how long they would be kept in prison, nor were they pressed with specific charges. After being moved between different city and county jails, sixteen men, including six of the twenty-six men who were sent to the jail and an additional ten sent later from Manzanar, were relocated to Moab on January 11, 1943. These were the first men to come to the camp. The next thirteen came from the internment camp in Gila, Arizona, then ten more from Manzanar, eleven from Topaz, and finally fifteen from the Tule Lake internment center.

=== Living conditions and treatment of internees ===
When the original sixteen internees arrived at Dalton Wells, they were escorted and guarded by a detachment of military police numbering one hundred and fifty. The camp itself is described as being far from any civilization in a barren desert without any sagebrush or any trees according to Ueno. The original sixteen men brought to Dalton Wells had an abbreviated hearing before being brought to the camp. They rode a train to Thompson, Utah, and were escorted on a truck for the remainder of the journey to Dalton Wells. The latter groups were sent to Dalton Wells because they, like the original sixteen men from Manzanar, were considered troublemakers. Eleven men from Topaz were sent to the camp after they answered "Yes" when asked about their loyalty to Japan by FBI agents. Fifteen men from the Tule internment center were sent to Dalton Wells because they refused to sign a document pledging their loyalty to the United States and willingness to join the United States Army.

Internees at Dalton Wells were sometimes not allowed to send mail to their families, and all mail that they received was opened and reviewed before they received it. This led to an argument between Ueno and Best. Ueno recorded that he was threatened by Best in their conversation.

Ueno and a few other internees protested the work order slips given to them by refusing to work and harassed other internees to convince them to refuse to work as well. Frederick moved Ueno and three others to another bunker to isolate them from the other internees. Ueno and the others left their isolated bunker at night to visit and threaten internees. The following morning, Frederick issued a rule to the internees that they could not leave their bunker to visit another bunker without receiving a permit from him. In an act of protest, twenty-three men left their bunkers and came to the front office with their belongings. Frederick detained twenty-one of the men, tried them, found eight of them guilty, and had seven of them transported to the Grand County jail to serve a three-month sentence. In April 1943, when most of the Dalton Wells internees had been transported to the Leupp camp, the seven men still at the Grand County jail were put in a five-foot by six-foot box and driven 13 hours to the camp.

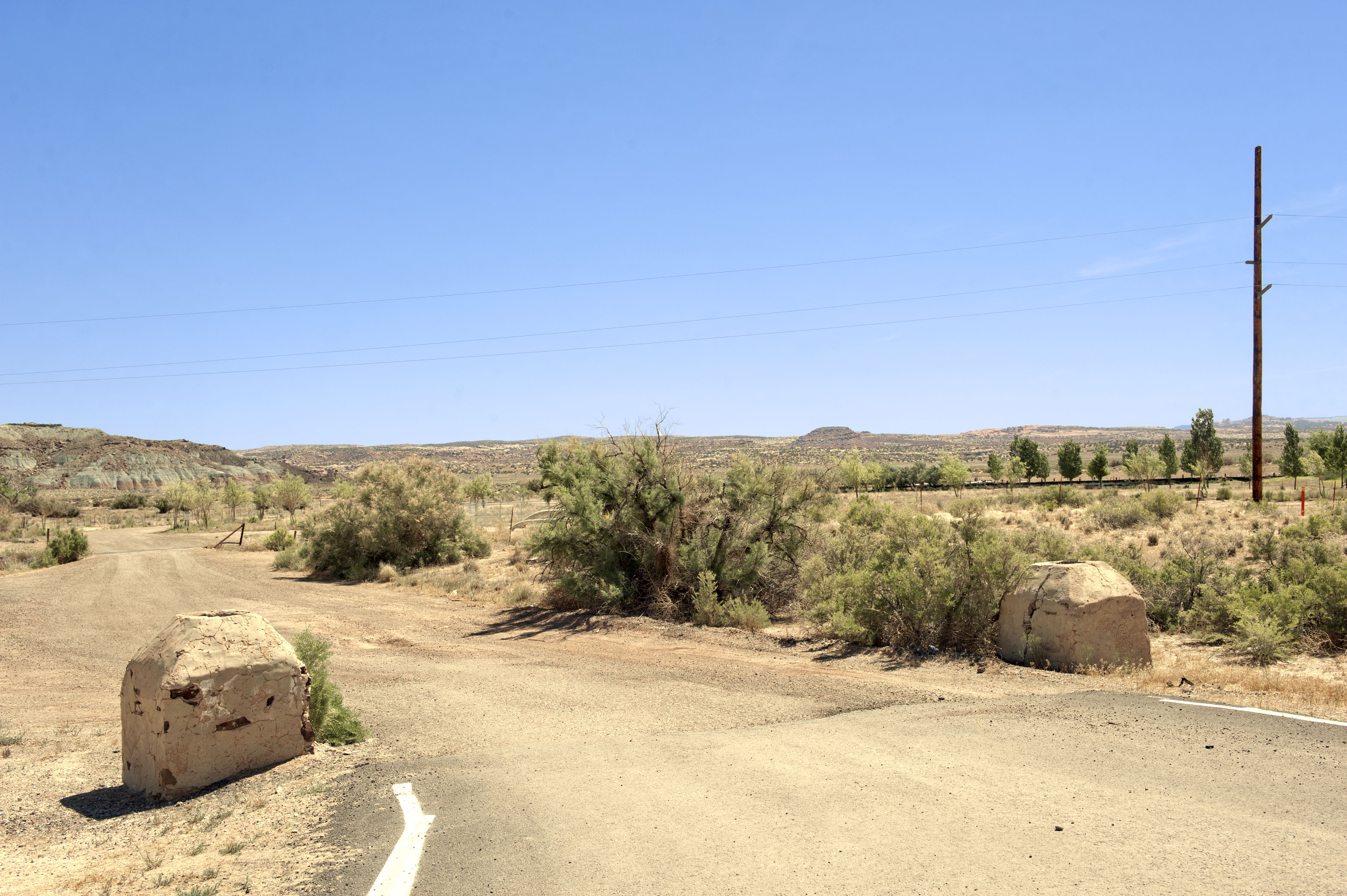
Dalton Wells Today

== Shutdown ==
On March 24, 1943, the WRA gained possession of a new compound in Leupp Arizona that would serve as a much larger isolation center compared to the Moab center. Just a month later on April 27, 1943, Dalton Wells was emptied, and the remaining internee population was transferred by bus to the larger isolation center in Leupp Arizona to remain under the director Raymond R. Best. Frederick continued to the Leupp center as well.

The only indications of the Dalton Wells camp now are two stones where the entrance once was, some concrete floors, a well that the CCC camp youth built, and a historical marker erected in 1995 that describes the CCC camp and the concentration camp.
