= Mary Nomura =

American singer of Japanese descent (1925–2026)

- Also known as: The Songbird of Manzanar
- Born: September 29, 1925; Los Angeles, California, U.S.
- Died: April 6, 2026 (aged 100) Huntington Beach, California, U.S.
- Occupation: Singer

Mary Kageyama Nomura (September 29, 1925 – April 6, 2026) was an American singer of Japanese descent who was relocated and incarcerated for her ancestry at the Manzanar concentration camp during World War II. She became known as The Songbird of Manzanar.

== Early life ==
Mary Kageyama was one of five children of carpenter Tomitaro Kageyama and his wife, dance teacher Machi Kageyama, immigrants from Japan who lived in Los Angeles. She learned Japanese opera music from her mother, and performed at the Koyasan Buddhist Temple as a four-year-old, but both her parents died by the time she was eight. Kageyama was raised by her older brother and sister, both teenagers at the time, who left their high school to keep the family together rather than letting the other children get sent to an orphanage.

Kageyama formed a singing group with two of her siblings, "the Kageyama Trio", and at age 12 became the only child performer in a pre-war Japanese-American musical group for servicemen. She went to Venice High School.

== Manzanar ==
After the signing of Executive Order 9066, the family was taken to Manzanar in 1942, when Kageyama was 16. There, she graduated from Manzanar High School in 1943, and worked as a receptionist and clerk. She continued her music under the mentorship of Manzanar's musical director Lou Frizzell, who accompanied her while she sang at camp musical performances and recorded two songs. She also sang at the weddings and funerals held at the camp. It was during this period that she became known as the "Songbird of Manzanar."

== Later life and death ==
After the war, Kageyama married Shiro (Shi) Nomura. Nomura had seen her perform at a Nisei festival before the war, but they first met at the camp. She continued singing, primarily at concentration camp reunions. Later in life, she jokingly gave herself the name "the Old Crow of Manzanar".

In 2016, actor Cody Edison produced a short documentary film about her, Songbird of Manzanar.

Nomura's daughter Lisa, son-in-law Gerald Ishibashi, and their children are all musical performers. Granddaughter Brittany Ishibashi is a television and film actress, and another granddaughter, Brooke Ishibashi, has performed professionally as an actor and singer in a lead role in the play Cambodian Rock Band.

Nomura died at her home in Huntington Beach, California, on April 6, 2026, at the age of 100.

== Legacy ==
In May 2026, Nomura was honored on the House floor by U.S. Representative Dave Min (D-California). In September 2026, Min introduced legislation to name the USPS facility in Irvine the Mary Kageyama Nomura Post Office Building in her honor; if passed, it would be the first post office named in honor of a Japanese American who was incarcerated during World War II at a concentration camp.
