= Commission on Wartime Relocation and Internment of Civilians =

U.S. investigation into internment of Japanese Americans

The Commission on Wartime Relocation and Internment of Civilians (CWRIC) was a group of nine people appointed by the U.S. Congress in 1980 to conduct an official governmental study into the internment of Japanese Americans during World War II.

== Proceedings ==
The Commission examined Executive Order 9066 (1942), related orders during World War II, and their effects on Japanese Americans in the West and Alaska Natives in the Pribilof Islands. It was directed to look at the circumstances and facts involving the impact of Executive Order 9066 on American citizens and on permanent resident aliens. It was also directed to look at the directives of the U.S. military and their detention in internment camps and relocation of these people. In July 1981, the Commission held public hearings in Washington, D.C. to hear testimony from Japanese-American and Alaska Native witnesses. Public hearings followed in other American cities, including Seattle, San Francisco, Cambridge, New York City, Anchorage, the Aleutian Islands, Pribilof Islands (St. Paul), Chicago, and Los Angeles, where the testimonies were recorded. More than 750 people testified. The Commission then wrote up a report presenting it to Congress.

== Findings ==
First, the Commission looked at the decision of the exclusion, the justification for this, and the conditions that permitted the decision. The decision they found was mostly based on fear and racism. There was a lot of public fear at the time due to racial stereotypes. The justification by General DeWitt, the man who recommended this action, was found to be unreasonable and racist. He claimed that the Japanese demonstrated a military danger; however, the majority of the Japanese population were law-abiding civilians so this clearly was not the case. The General's next justification was that the Japanese were not loyal. The Commission found this "disloyalty" to be based on the different culture the Japanese had. This was clearly not disloyalty, but a mere difference in culture and posed no threat to military security. The Commission then wondered how such a decision could have allowed this decision to be permitted when the justification had no clear basis. They found out that it was allowed because many people really did believe in this ethnicity determined loyalty and were afraid of the Japanese. Also, the President at the time, Franklin D. Roosevelt, wanted to calm the public and get rid of any rumors surrounding the attack on Pearl Harbor.

The Commission then examined the detention of these ethnic Japanese civilians and the effects of this exclusion and detention. The decision to detain was found by the commission to be due to the believed threat the Japanese were potential spies and saboteurs; but as found before, this was extremely unlikely. These camps were cruel and inhumane. People were housed in rooms of twenty by twenty-four feet. These "houses" were for a full family no matter the size. The children, in an attempt to Americanize them, were forced to salute the flag and sing "My Country, 'Tis of Thee". This song was about liberty and freedom, whereas here these children were forced to live in these cruel camps. Many adults were also forced to do very hard and physically intense labor. These camps, the Commission found, did much psychological and physical damage to the civilians in them.

== Report and recommendations ==
In 1983, the CWRIC issued its findings in Personal Justice Denied, concluding that the incarceration of Japanese Americans had not been justified by military necessity. The Commission even stated: "A grave injustice was done to American citizens and resident aliens of Japanese ancestry who, without individual review or any probative evidence against them..." The report determined that the decision to incarcerate was based on "racial prejudice, wartime hysteria, and a failure of political leadership." The Commission concluded that the incarceration of Japanese Americans during World War II was a "grave injustice".

Lastly, the Commission recommended legislative remedies: an official Government apology and redress payments to survivors. In 1988, Congress passed the Civil Liberties Act of 1988 and later signed into law by President Ronald Reagan. The Act's purposes included the government's acknowledging and apologizing for the injustice of the evacuation and internment of U.S. citizens and long-term residents of Japanese ancestry; creating a public education fund to inform the public; making restitution to parties affected; discouraging a similar event from happening in the future; and demonstrating the U.S.' consideration of human rights violations. By this act and a related one in 1992, the US government paid reparations to more than 82,200 Japanese Americans. Reparations were not granted for Japanese Latin Americans who were also incarcerated by the US government.

== Members of the Commission ==
- Joan Z. Bernstein, Chair
- Daniel E. Lungren, Vice-Chair
- Edward W. Brooke
- Robert F. Drinan
- Arthur S. Flemming
- Arthur J. Goldberg
- Ishmael V. Gromoff
- William M. Marutani
- Hugh B. Mitchell
- Angus Macbeth (Special Counsel)

== See also ==
- Bibliography of the Japanese American Internment during World War II
- Outline of Japanese American Internment during World War II
