= Tuna Canyon Detention Station =

Coordinates: 34.2500°N 118.2833°W

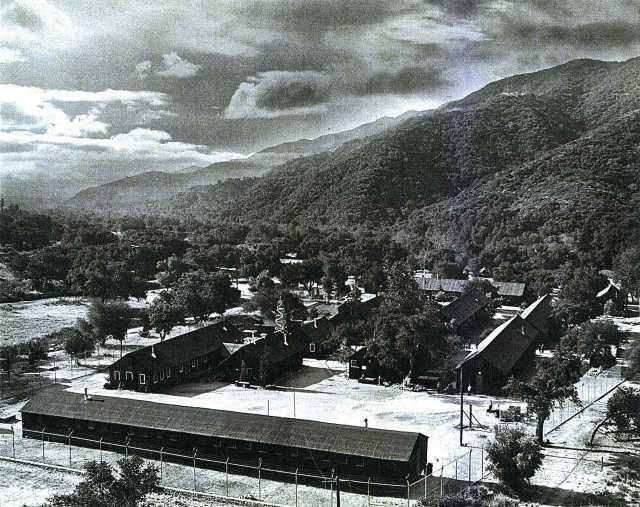
Overhead view of the Tuna Canyon Detention Station Photo: M.H. Scott, Officer In Charge, Tuna Canyon Detention Station.Courtesy David Scott and the Little Landers Historical Society

Tuna Canyon Detention Station was a temporary detention facility used for holding hundreds of Japanese Americans who were considered enemy aliens by the U.S. government and to be risks to the nation's security. The detention camp was located in Tujunga at a former Civilian Conservation (CCC) Camp, constructed in 1933. The camp was converted into the Tuna Canyon Detention Station just after the bombing of Pearl Harbor. Administered by the Department of Justice, it opened on December 16, 1941, when the first group of detainees arrived from various Southern California towns and cities. Tuna Canyon had a capacity of 300, and until its closing in October 30, 1943, over 2,000 Japanese, German, and Italian immigrants, Japanese Peruvians, and others were imprisoned there. Most were transferred to other DOJ facilities like Fort Missoula, Fort Lincoln and Santa Fe. The site was used as a probation school after the war.

In 1960, the property was sold and turned into the Verdugo Hills Golf Course. The Tuna Canyon Detention Station and camp sites are located in the southeastern area of the golf course, where the driving range and overflow parking were built.

A portion of the former detention site, located at 6433 West La Tuna Canyon Road, was recognized as a Los Angeles Historic-Cultural Monument by the City of Los Angeles in 2013. A housing developer, Snowball West Investments, is attempting to build on the land, and it has filed a lawsuit to contest that recognition.

== See also ==
- Bibliography of the Japanese American Internment during World War II
- Outline of Japanese American Internment during World War II
- Internment camps for Japanese Americans
- Sunland-Tujunga, Los Angeles
