= Japanese Evacuation and Resettlement Study =

1942 research project

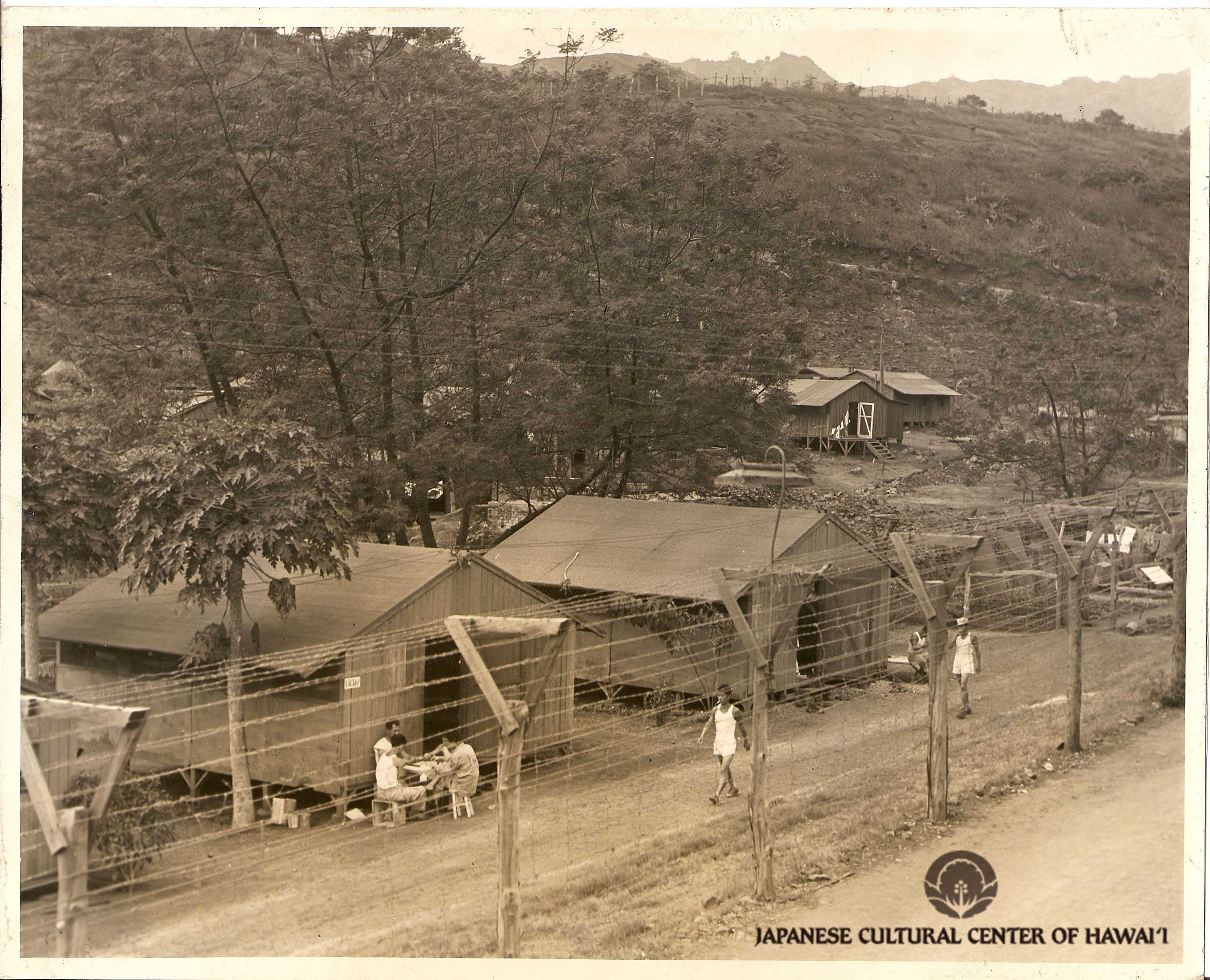
Internment camp in Honouliuli, Hawaii (1945)

The Japanese American Evacuation and Resettlement Study (JERS) was a research project initiated in 1942 funded by the War Relocation Authority (WRA), an agency responsible for overseeing the relocation of Japanese Americans, The University of California, the Giannini Foundation, the Columbian Foundation, and the Rockefeller Foundation with the total amount of funding reaching almost 100,000 U.S. dollars. It was conducted by a team of social scientists at the University of California, Berkeley. The team was led by sociologist Dorothy Swaine Thomas, a Lecturer in Sociology for the Giannini Foundation and a professor of rural sociology, and included anthropologists John Collier Jr. and Alexander Leighton, among others. The study combined each of the major social sciences such as sociology, social anthropology, political science, social psychology, and economics to effectively illustrate the effects of internment on Japanese Americans. The terminology of "relocation" can be confusing: The WRA termed the forced removal of Japanese Americans from the West Coast an "evacuation" and called the incarceration of these people in the ten camps as "relocation." Later it also applied the term "relocation" to the program that enabled the evacuees to leave the camps (provided they had been certified as loyal.

On February 19, 1942, Franklin D. Roosevelt issued Executive Order 9066 which granted the Secretary of War, Henry L. Stimson, and his commanders the power “to prescribe military areas in such places and of such extent as he or the appropriate Military Commander may determine, from which any or all persons may be excluded.” While no specific group or location was mentioned in the order, it was quickly applied to virtually the entire Japanese American population on the West Coast, with the largest population affected living in California. When the law went into effect, 2,500 students of Japanese ancestry were enrolled in college campuses on the West Coast with about 700 of them studying at the University of California and 1,300 at UC Berkeley. Nisei interviews from men such as Charles Kikuchi, who is now best known for being the author of “The Kikuchi Diary: Chronicle from an American Concentration Camp” (1973 - a collection of Kikuchi's first nine months of incarceration), reveal that removal from campus to concentration camps was a dramatic interruption to students’ scholarly lives. Mary Oyama, a woman who wrote her experiences in an article called "My Only Crime is My Face" detailed a similar interruption saying that they “got on the buses and said goodbye - perhaps forever - to that old free civilian life [they] had loved so well.” The Executive Order was met with intense backlash and was seen as a violation of constitutional rights. This executive order lead to the infamous Supreme Court trial known as Korematsu v. United States in which the Court ruled in a 6 to 3 decision that the federal government had the power to arrest and intern Fred Toyosaburo Korematsu under Presidential Executive Order 9066, thus legalizing the internment and confinement of Japanese Americans present in the United States.

Beginning in February 1942 and ending in July 1948, under president Franklin D Roosevelt JERS was conducted through World War II in response to the forced relocation and incarceration of 110,000 persons of Japanese heritage, 70,000 of which were American citizens, all living on the West Coast of the United States who were interned due to the fear of Japanese espionage following the bombing of Pearl Harbor on December 7, 1941. The study aimed to document the experiences of Japanese American experiences in internment via selected Nisei (a person born in the US or Canada whose parents were immigrants from Japan) social students from Berkeley’s Campus.

The JERS staff concentrated their studies on Japanese from camps located at Tule Lake, Gila River, and Poston/Colorado River, with minor involvement at Topaz/Central Utah, Manzanar, and Minidoka. The material was also gathered from temporary detention centers, primarily the Tanforan and Tulare centers located in California. Their findings were recorded in several volumes, the first of which was called “The Spoilage” which analyzes the experiences of the detained group, some 18,000 in total, whose response was to renounce America as a homeland. This volume illustrates the steps by which these "disloyal" citizens were inexorably pushed toward the disaster of denationalization. A companion volume “The Salvage” was published in 1952 and illustrated the journey of Japanese Americans who moved from internment camps to the Chicago area through information given by daily journals, field reports, life histories, and secondary research materials collected and compiled by the research staff.
