= Sharp Park Detention Station =

- Detainee camp
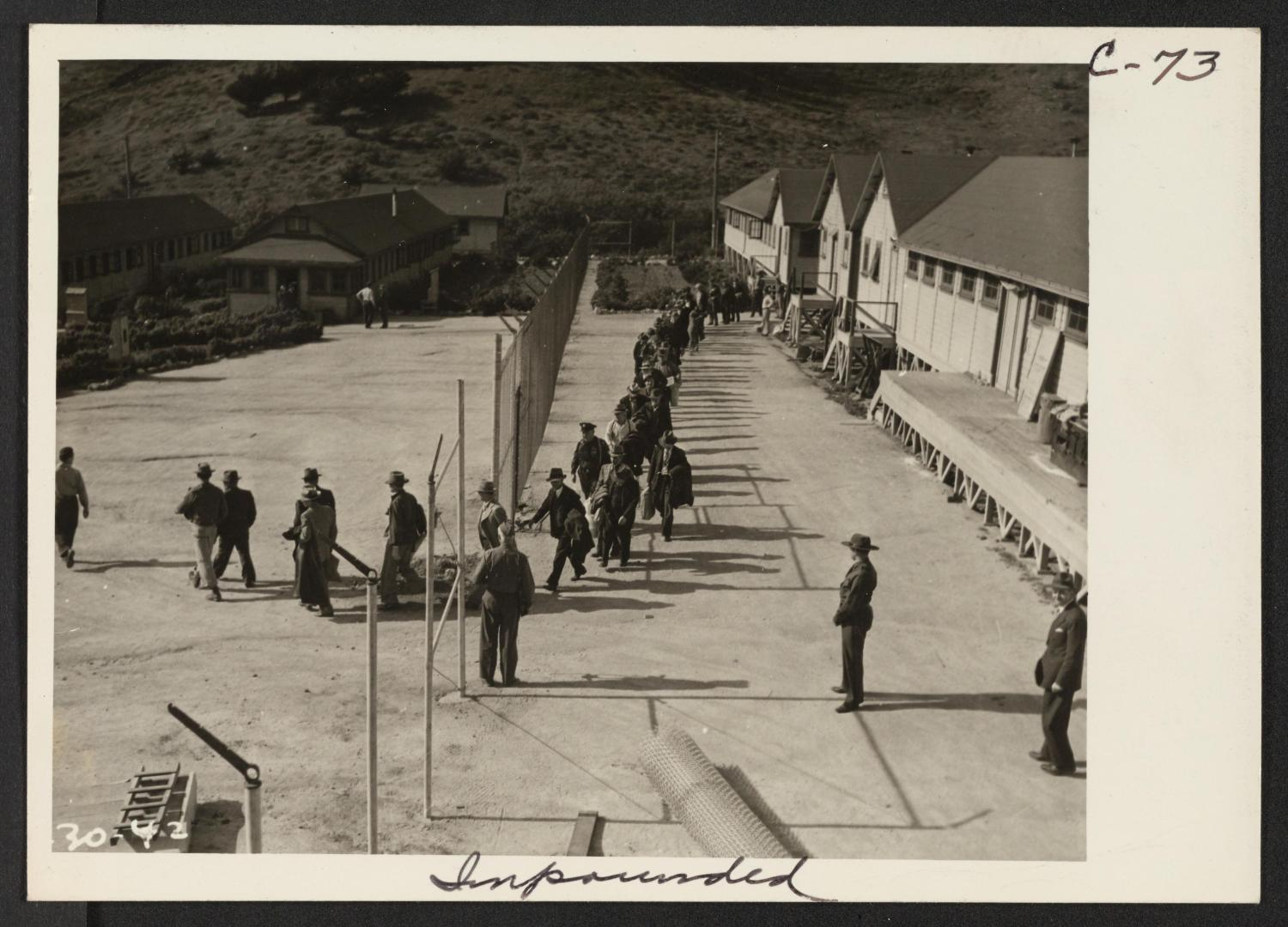
- Sharp Park Internment Camp, 1942

- Location within California
- Coordinates: 37°37′32.42″N 122°28′29.7″W
- Country: United States
- State: California
- Opened: 1942
- Closed: 1946
- Founder: War Relocation Authority

Population
  - Total: 2,500

The Sharp Park Detention Station was a Japanese, Italian and German Internment camp located in northern California on land owned by San Francisco in Pacifica. Open from March 30, 1942, until 1946, the camp was built to hold as many as 600 detainees, but later held approximately 2,500 detainees.

== History ==
During the Great Depression, the area east of the Sharp Park Golf Course was used as a State Emergency Relief Administration camp to house indigent San Franciscans. The Civil Works Administration employed 600 men to build the camp in 1933, providing food, lodging, medical care and 25 cents a day.

After the 1941 attack on Pearl Harbor, President Franklin Roosevelt signed Executive Order 9066 to detain Japanese Americans. In 1942, the relief camp at Sharp Park was selected by the Immigration and Naturalization Service as an internment camp.

== Sharp Park Detention Station ==
San Francisco turned over the Sharp Park camp to the federal government in early 1942, and it was opened as an internment camp on March 30, 1942. Quonset huts were built to initially hold between 450 internees. The first detainees at Sharp Park were 193 people transferred on March 31, 1942, from Angel Island Immigration Station, after it was damaged by a fire.

In press coverage of the transfer, the San Francisco News stated "scores of alien Japanese today" were interned in Sharp Park, "where many of them used to spend Sundays fishing... and possibly making notes of reefs, currents and landmarks for the Japanese Navy."

Expansions to the camp grew its holding capacity to 1,200 detainees, though Yamato Ichihashi, who spent six weeks at Sharp Park, wrote there were never more than 500 internees while he was there. Those held included Germans, Italians and Japanese Americans, as well as Mexican, Canadian and Chinese nationals who were believed to hold anti-American sentiments.

Sharp Park held individuals deemed "highly dangerous" by the U.S. government, including priests, community leaders, teachers, and newspaper editors. Press coverage at the time claimed the detainees included "members of secret groups" who "possessed weapons, explosives, signal lights, short wave receiving sets, and other contraband."" Detainees were often held at Sharp Park before being transferred to larger camps further inland.

== Present day ==
The Sharp Park camp was torn apart several years after the war. There are not currently any historical markers noting the existence of the camp, and local schools are not taught about the existence of the Sharp Park internment camp. The site of the camp is used today by the San Francisco Archery Club, and the Pacifica Co-op Nursery School uses one of the camp's Quonset huts as a classroom.

In 2022, a group of local Italian-Americans held a presentation on the history of the camp. The organizer, Christina Olivolo, told the Pacifica Tribune, "We didn’t know this was even here. It got to me. Why weren’t we told? We should have been told. People need to know. I found it very disturbing that we didn’t even know about it."

== See also ==
- Bibliography of the Japanese American Internment during World War II
- Outline of Japanese American Internment during World War II
