= Executive Order 9102 =

1942 United States executive order

- Establishing the War Relocation Authority in the Executive Office of the President and Defining Its Functions and Duties
- Type: Executive order
- Number: 9102
- President: Franklin D. Roosevelt
- Signed: March 18, 1942

Summary
- Establishes the War Relocation Authority

Repealed by
- Harry S. Truman, June 26, 1946

Executive Order 9102 is a United States presidential executive order creating the War Relocation Authority (WRA), the US civilian agency responsible for the forced relocation and internment of Japanese-Americans during World War II. The executive order was signed by President Franklin Roosevelt on March 18, 1942, and was terminated by President Harry S. Truman on June 26, 1946, with operations ceasing on June 30. The Director reported directly to the president of the United States. Like his Executive Order 9066, Roosevelt did not specifically mention Japanese Americans anywhere in the text, referring only to "persons whose removal is necessary". In contrast, the numerous exclusion orders signed by General John L. DeWitt specifically stated that those to be removed were "persons of Japanese ancestry".

== Leadership ==
Milton S. Eisenhower, previously an official of the United States Department of Agriculture, was chosen to head the WRA. Eisenhower stepped down as the Director of the WRA in June 1942 to take a position as Elmer Davis's deputy at the Office of War Information, and Dillon S. Myer was appointed in his place. Myer asked Eisenhower if he should accept, and according to Myer, Eisenhower advised him "Dillon, if you can sleep and still carry on the job my answer would be yes. I can’t sleep and do this job. I had to get out of it."

When Milton said that he couldn’t sleep he meant literally that because he was very disturbed about the whole WRA concept. He found the situation that he was facing most difficult, with the antagonisms on the part of much of the American public against the Japanese because we were at war with Japan and many people did not differentiate between the Japanese Americans and the Japanese with whom we were at war. At the same time the problems of moving people from assembly centers on the West Coast into temporary relocation centers I’m sure got on his nerves very badly, and he was practically ill.

— Dillon S. Myer, 1970 interview with Helen Pryor

By the time Myer was appointed Director of the WRA on June 17, 1942, plans for the complete relocation of Japanese-Americans had already been announced. Myer later recalled that he soon discovered after his appointment that "most of the reasons [for the evacuation and General DeWitt's actions] were phony and many of the rumors which were used to justify the evacuation which came out of the attack on Hawaii were proven to be completely untrue". Myer also stated that influential figures were backing the evacuation, including "Earl Warren, [who] was Attorney General of California but looking forward to being candidate for governor in the fall of 1942 which he was and he favored the evacuation" and "[Col. Karl Bendetsen] was a prime mover in recommending to General DeWitt that he carry out the evacuation. As a matter of fact after the evacuation order was issued here on the mainland he tried for weeks to get a large group of people evacuated from Hawaii with the idea I am sure of justifying their West Coast evacuation."

Within nine months, the WRA had opened ten facilities in seven states, and transported over 100,000 people from the WLCA facilities of whom 64 percent were American citizens. Over the course of the next 19 months, approximately 120,000 Japanese-Americans were removed from the Pacific coast and placed in internment camps. On June 26, 1946, the facilities' operations were terminated by President Harry S. Truman.

== See also ==
- Bibliography of the Japanese American Internment during World War II
- Outline of Japanese American Internment during World War II
- Internment of Japanese Americans
- Executive Order 9066
