= 1944 United States House of Representatives election in New Mexico =

1944 United States House of Representatives elections in New Mexico
- November 7, 1944

All 2 New Mexico seats to the United States House of Representatives
	Majority party	Minority party
Party	Democratic	Republican
Last election	2	0
Seats won	2	0
Seat change	Steady	Steady
Popular vote	165,996	132,953
Percentage	55.5%	44.5%
Swing	▼2.7%	▲2.7%
- County Results; Democrat: 50–60% 60–70% 70–80% Republican: 50–60%

The 1944 United States House of Representatives election in New Mexico was held on Tuesday November 7, 1944 to elect the states two At-large representatives on a General ticket. The Democratic party retained both of their at-large members in New Mexico.

This election coincided with the 1944 Presidential election and the state's Governor election. Democrats would hold both seats in the New Mexico house delegation until 1968.

== Overview ==
United States House of Representatives elections in New Mexico, 1944
Party	Votes	Percentage	Seats	+/–
Democratic	165,996	55.53%	2	—
Republican	132,953	44.47%	0	—
Totals	298,949	100.00%	2	—

=== Results ===
Results with all candidates

New Mexico At-large congressional district election, 1944
Party	Candidate	Votes	%
Democratic	Clinton Anderson (Incumbent)	85,244	28.52
Democratic	Antonio M. Fernández (Incumbent)	80,752	27.01
Republican	Manuel Lujan Sr.	66,644	22.29
Republican	Ben F. Meyer	66,309	22.18
Total votes		298,949	100.00
