= Glenn L. Emmons =

American government official

Glenn Leonidas Emmons

Commissioner of Indian Affairs
- In office August 10, 1953 – September 20, 1961
- President: Dwight D. Eisenhower
- Preceded by: Dillon S. Myer
- Succeeded by: Philleo Nash

Personal details
- Born: August 15, 1895 Atmore, Alabama
- Died: March 14, 1980 (Aged 84) Albuquerque, New Mexico
- Party: Republican
- Occupation: Banker, Politician

Glenn Leonidas Emmons (1895–1980) was an American banker and politician who served as the Commissioner of the Bureau of Indian Affairs from 1953 to 1961 under President Dwight D. Eisenhower, succeeding Dillon S. Myer. in addition, he was a candidate for Governor of New Mexico in 1944.

== Personal life ==
Emmons was born in 1895 in Alabama to John Davidson Emmons (June 30, 1853 - unknown), and Martha Jane Emmons (March 22, 1865 - unknown). He had 8 siblings. his family moved to Albuquerque, New Mexico in 1905, Where he learned in a public school, and subsequently attended the University of New Mexico

In 1917, he left university to serve in World War I, and served in the United States Army until he was discharged in 1929, he served as a first lieutenant in the Air Corps. After he was discharged, he moved to Gallup, New Mexico, where he worked in the banking business, chairing the board of the First State bank of Gallup, as well as being its chairman, from 1935 to 1964 Emmons served on various committees in the American Bankers Association, and served as its treasurer from 1949 to 1951. He also served as its president.

In 1944, Emmons ran unsuccessfully for the Republican Nomination for Governor of New Mexico.

In 1953, he was nominated by President Dwight D. Eisenhower to serve as the Commissioner of the Bureau of Indian Affairs, after being unanimously endorsed by the 74 member Navajo Tribal Council. his nomination followed the withdrawal of Alva Simpson Jr, who served as the Welfare Director of Santa Fe.

== Commissioner of the Bureau of Indian Affairs ==
In 1955, Emmons contributed to "The Oglala Sioux: Warriors in Transition", a book by Dr. Robert H. Ruby, by writing its foreword.

As Commissioner, he was directed to enact programs designed to bring tribal groups to a level where they would need only minimal federal assistance. Emmons' programs effectively increased federal assistance to Indians. Under Emmons' leadership, the Bureau of Indian Affairs health programs were transferred to the U.S. Public Health Service, which would result in improved services to Indians. Emmons increased government funding for education, particularly for the Navajo. His programs included converting mobile home trailers into schools and encouraging public schools to admit Indian children. Emmons also instituted adult education classes, primarily to teach English language skills to adult Indians, and initiated vocational job training programs, he also advocated reclamation of Indian lands, and encouraged development of industry, including oil, uranium, and coal leasing.

In addition, Emmons wrote the first Tribal Termination plans, which would end the Federal Relationship with Indian tribes, stripping them of their Treaty protections, lands, and sovereignty.

Emmons did not support forced relocation; he advocated reclamation of Indian lands, encouraging development of industry, including oil, uranium, and coal leasing. More roads and bridges were built on Indian lands during his tenure than all other commissioners combined. In 1957, Emmons received the Distinguished Service Award from the Department of Interior for "outstanding achievement in materially improving the health protection, the educational facilities, and the economic prospects for Indian people." from President Eisenhower

Emmons retired from his post and was replaced by Philleo Nash on September 20, 1961.

== Post-Commission Career ==
In 1977, Emmons was presented with the Zimmerman Award and an honorary doctor of laws degree from the University of New Mexico. He died on March 14, 1980

== Electoral history ==
1944 New Mexico gubernatorial election - Republican Primary results
Party	Candidate	Votes	%
Republican	Carroll G. Gunderson	9,477	59.35%
Republican	Glenn L. Emmons	6,492	40.65%
Total votes		2,193,750	100
