= War Relocation Authority =

U.S. government agency created in 1942

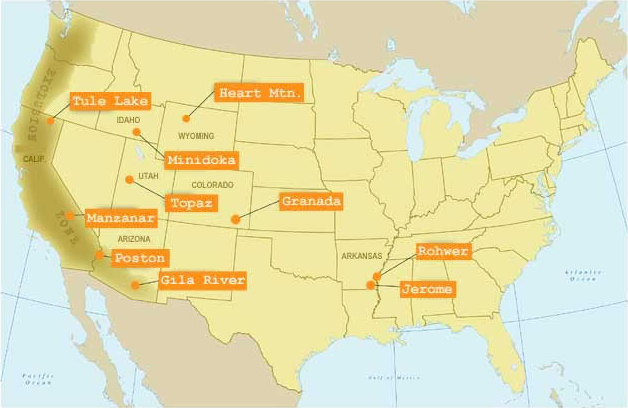
The War Relocation Authority operated ten Japanese-American internment camps in remote areas of the United States during World War II.

The War Relocation Authority (WRA) was a United States government agency established to handle the internment of Japanese Americans during World War II. It also operated the Fort Ontario Emergency Refugee Shelter in Oswego, New York, which was the only refugee camp set up in the United States for refugees from Europe. The agency was created by Executive Order 9102 on March 18, 1942, by President Franklin D. Roosevelt, and was terminated June 26, 1946, by order of President Harry S. Truman.

== Formation ==
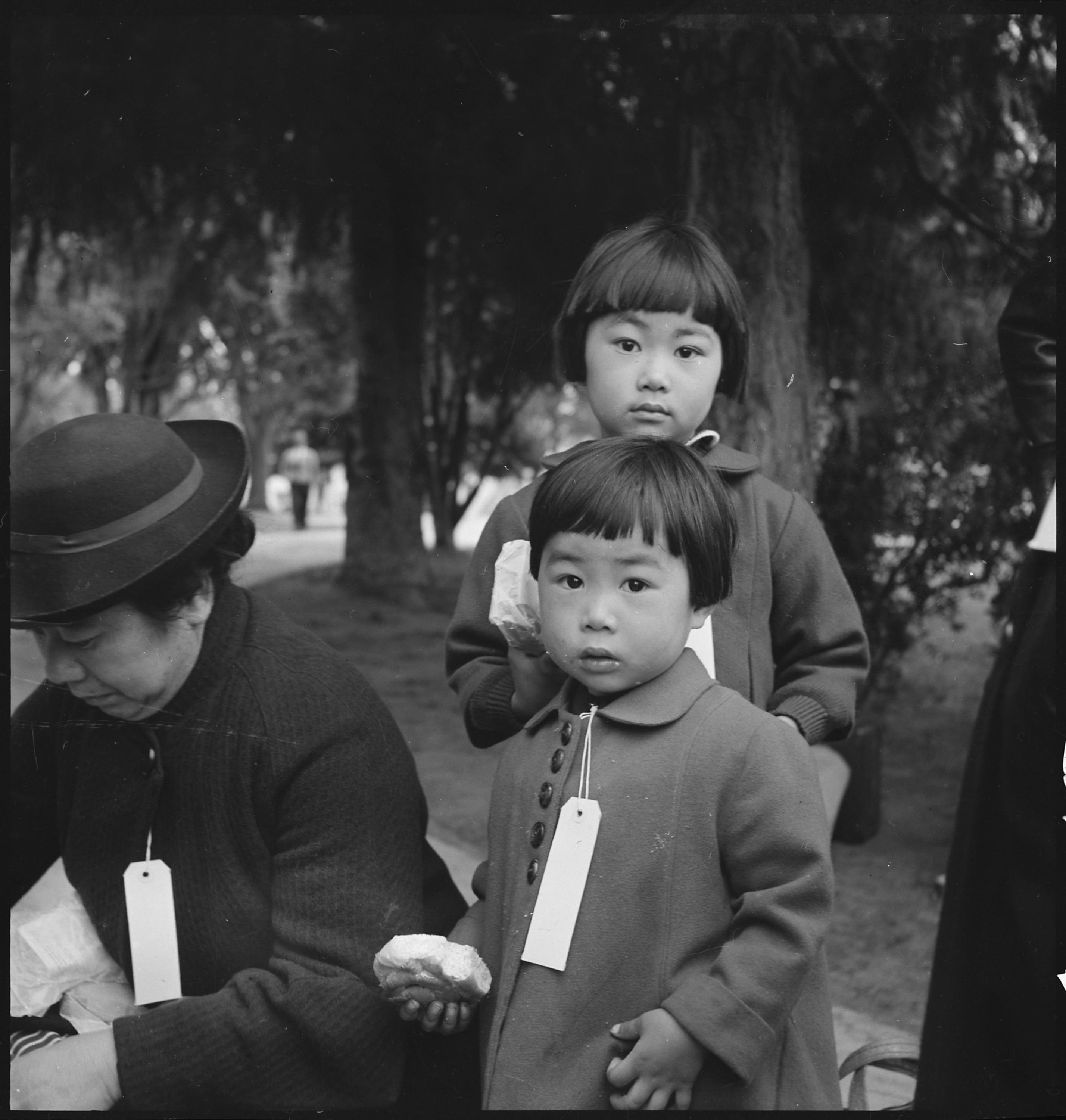
Hayward, California, May 8, 1942. Two children of the Mochida family who, with their parents, are awaiting an evacuation bus. The youngster on the right holds a sandwich given to her by one of a group of women who were present from a local church. The family unit is kept intact during evacuation and at War Relocation Authority centers where evacuees of Japanese ancestry will be housed for the duration. (Photo by Dorothea Lange).

After the December 1941 attack on Pearl Harbor, President Franklin D. Roosevelt issued Executive Order 9066, authorizing military commanders to create zones from which certain persons could be excluded if they posed a threat to national security. Many people of Japanese ancestry were also suspected of espionage after the Pearl Harbor attack. Military Areas 1 and 2 were created soon after, encompassing all of California and parts of Washington, Oregon, and Arizona, and subsequent civilian exclusion orders informed Japanese Americans residing in these zones they would be scheduled for "evacuation." The executive order also applied to Alaska as well, bringing the entire United States West Coast as off-limits to Japanese nationals and Americans of Japanese descent.

On March 18, 1942, the WRA was formed via Executive Order 9102. It was in many ways a direct successor to the Works Projects Administration (WPA) and the efforts of both overlapped and intermingled for quite some time. From March until November, the WPA spent more on internment than any other agency including the Army and was on the scene with removal and relocation even before Executive Order 9192. Beginning on March 11, for example, Rex L. Nicholson, the WPA's regional director, managed the first "Reception and Induction" centers. Another WPA veteran, Clayton E. Triggs, was the administrator the Manzanar Relocation Center, a facility which, according to one insider, was "manned just about 100% by the WPA." Drawing on his background in New Deal road construction, Triggs installed such familiar concentration camp features as guard towers and spotlights. As the WPA wound down in late 1942 and early 1943, many of its employees moved over seamlessly to the WRA..

Milton S. Eisenhower was the WRA's original director. Eisenhower was a proponent of Roosevelt's New Deal and disapproved of the idea of mass internment. Early on he had tried, unsuccessfully, to limit the internment to adult men, allowing women and children to remain free, and he pushed to keep WRA policy in line with the original idea of making the camps similar to subsistence homesteads in the rural interior of the country. This, along with proposals for helping Japanese Americans resettle in labor-starved farming communities outside the exclusion zone, was met with opposition from the governors of these interior states, who worried about security issues and claimed it was "politically infeasible," at a meeting in Salt Lake City in April 1942. Shortly before the meeting Eisenhower wrote to his former boss, Secretary of Agriculture Claude Wickard, and said, "when the war is over and we consider calmly this unprecedented migration of 120,000 people, we as Americans are going to regret the unavoidable injustices that we may have done".

Disappointed, Eisenhower was director of the WRA for only ninety days, resigning June 18, 1942. However, during his tenure with the WRA he raised wages for interned Japanese Americans, worked with the Japanese American Citizens League to establish an internee advisory council, initiated a student leave program for college-age Nisei, and petitioned Congress to create programs for postwar rehabilitation. He also pushed Roosevelt to make a public statement in support of loyal Nisei and attempted to enlist the Federal Reserve Bank to protect the property left behind by displaced Japanese Americans, but was unable to overcome opposition to these proposals. Eisenhower was replaced by Dillon S. Myer, who would run the WRA until its dissolution at the end of the war.

Japanese Americans had already been removed from their West Coast homes and placed in temporary "assembly centers" (run by a separate military body, the Wartime Civilian Control Administration [WCCA]) over the spring of 1942; Myer's primary responsibility upon taking the position was to continue with the planning and construction of the more permanent replacements for the camps run by the WCCA.

== Selection of camp sites ==
The WRA considered 300 potential sites before settling on a total of ten camp locations, mostly on tribal lands. Site selection was based upon multiple criteria, including:

- Ability to provide work in public works, agriculture, manufacturing.
- Adequate transportation, power facilities, sufficient area of quality soil, water, and climate
- Able to house at least 5,000 people
- Public land

The camps had to be built from the ground up, and wartime shortages of labor and lumber combined with the vast scope of each construction project (several of the WRA camps were among the largest "cities" in the states that housed them) meant that many sites were unfinished when transfers began to arrive from the assembly centers. At Manzanar, for example, internees were recruited to help complete construction.

== Life in the camps ==
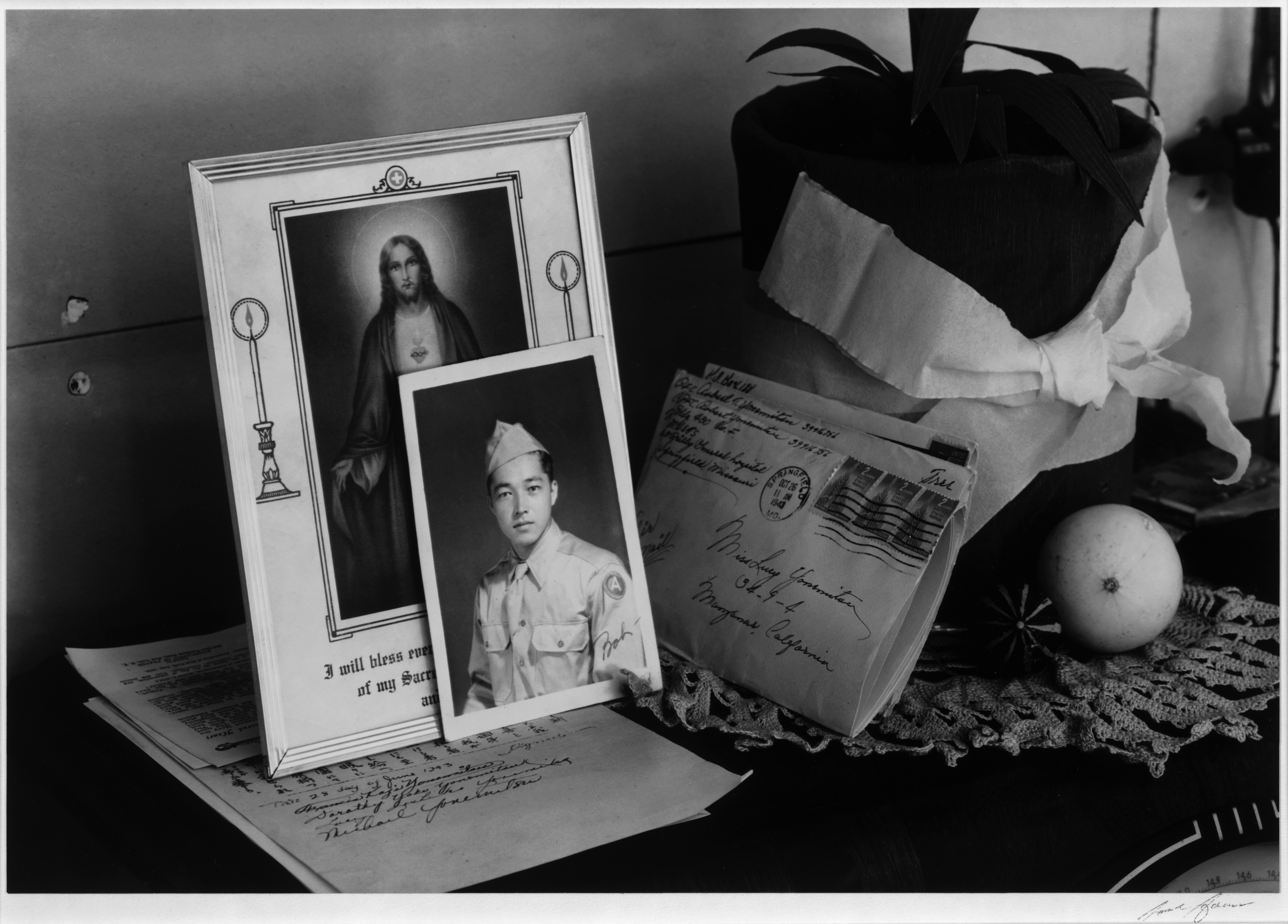
A homemade planter and a doily beside a service portrait, a prayer, and a letter home. One of the few ways to earn permission to leave the camps was to enter military service.

Life in a WRA camp was difficult. Those fortunate enough to find a job worked long hours, usually in agricultural jobs. Resistance to camp guards and escape attempts were a low priority for most of the Japanese Americans held in the camps. Residents were more often concerned with the problems of day-to-day life: improving their often shoddily-constructed living quarters, getting an education, and, in some cases, preparing for eventual release. Many of those who were employed, particularly those with responsible or absorbing jobs, made these jobs the focus of their lives. However, the pay rate was deliberately set far lower than what inmates would have received outside camp, an administrative response to widespread rumors that Japanese Americans were receiving special treatment while the larger public suffered from wartime shortages. Non-skilled labor earned $14/month while doctors and dentists made a paltry $19/month.

Many found consolation in religion, and both Christian and Buddhist services were held regularly. Others concentrated on hobbies or sought self-improvement by taking adult classes, ranging from Americanization and American history and government to vocational courses in secretarial skills and bookkeeping, and cultural courses in such things as ikebana, Japanese flower arrangement. The young people spent much of their time in recreational pursuits: news of sports, theatrics, and dances fills the pages of the camp newspaper.

Living space was minimal. Families lived in army-style barracks partitioned into "apartments" with walls that usually did not reach the ceiling. These "apartments" were, at the largest, twenty by twenty-four feet (6.1 by 7.3 m) and were expected to house a family of six. In April 1943, the Topaz camp averaged 114 square feet (10.6 m^{2}) (roughly six by nineteen feet [1.8 by 5.8 m]) per person.

Each inmate ate at one of several common mess halls, assigned by block. At the Army-run camps that housed dissidents and other "troublemakers", it was estimated that it cost 38.19 cents per day ($7.00 in present-day terms) to feed each person. The WRA spent slightly more, capping per-person costs to 50 cents a day ($9.00 in present-day terms) (again, to counteract rumors of "coddling" the inmates), but most people were able to supplement their diets with food grown in camp.

The WRA allowed Japanese Americans to establish a form of self-governance, with elected inmate leaders working under administration supervisors to help run the camps. This allowed inmates to keep busy and have some say in their day-to-day life; however, it also served the WRA mission of "Americanizing" the inmates so that they could be assimilated into white communities after the war. The "enemy alien" Issei were excluded from running for office, and inmates and community analysts argued that the WRA pulled the strings on important issues, leaving only the most basic and inconsequential decisions to Nisei leaders.

== Community Analysis Section ==
In February 1943, the WRA established the Community Analysis Section (under the umbrella of the Community Management Division) in order to collect information on the lives of incarcerated Japanese Americans in all ten camps. Employing over twenty cultural anthropologists and social scientists—including John Embree, Marvin and Morris Opler, Margaret Lantis, Edward Spicer, and Weston La Barre—the CAS produced reports on education, community-building and assimilation efforts in the camps, taking data from observations of and interviews with camp residents.

While some community analysts viewed the Japanese American inmates merely as research subjects, others opposed the incarceration and some of the WRA's policies in their reports, although very few made these criticisms public. Restricted by federal censors and WRA lawyers from publishing their full research from the camps, most of the (relatively few) reports produced by the CAS did not contradict the WRA's official stance that Japanese Americans remained, for the most part, happy behind the barbed wire. Morris Opler did, however, provide a prominent exception, writing two legal briefs challenging the exclusion for the Supreme Court cases of Gordon Hirabayashi and Fred Korematsu.

== Resettlement program ==
Concerned that Japanese Americans would become more dependent on the government the longer they remained in camp, Director Dillon Myer led the WRA in efforts to push inmates to leave camp and reintegrate into outside communities. Even before the establishment of the "relocation centers," agricultural laborers had been issued temporary work furloughs by the WCCA, and the National Japanese American Student Relocation Council had been placing Nisei in outside colleges since the spring of 1942. The WRA had initiated its own "leave permit" system in July 1942, although few took the trouble to go through the bureaucratic and cumbersome application process until it was streamlined over the following months. (By the end of 1942, only 884 had volunteered for resettlement.)

The need for a more easily navigable system, in addition to external pressure from pro-incarceration politicians and the general public to restrict who could exit the camps, led to a revision of the application process in 1943. Initially, applicants were required to find an outside sponsor, provide proof of employment or school enrollment, and pass an FBI background check. In the new system, inmates had only complete a registration form and pass a streamlined FBI check. (The "loyalty questionnaire," as the form came to be known after it was made mandatory for all adults regardless of their eligibility for resettlement, would later spark protests across all ten camps.)

At this point, the WRA began to shift its focus from managing the camps to overseeing resettlement. Field offices were established in Chicago, Salt Lake City and other hubs that had attracted Japanese American resettlers. Administrators worked with housing, employment and education sponsors in addition to social service agencies to provide assistance. Following Myer's directive to "assimilate" Japanese Americans into mainstream society, this network of WRA officials (and the propaganda they circulated in camp) steered resettlers toward cities that lacked large Japanese American populations and warned against sticking out by spending too much time among other Nikkei, speaking Japanese or otherwise clinging to cultural ties. By the end of 1944, close to 35,000 had left camp, mostly Nisei.

== Resistance to WRA policies ==
The WRA's "Americanization" efforts were not limited to the Nisei resettlers. Dillon Myer and other high-level officials believed that accepting the values and customs of white Americans was the best way for Japanese Americans to succeed both in and out of camp. Administrators sponsored patriotic activities and clubs, organized English classes for the Issei, encouraged young men to volunteer for the U.S. Army, and touted inmate self-government as an example of American democracy. "Good" inmates who toed the WRA line were rewarded, while "troublemakers" who protested their confinement and Issei elders who had been leaders in their prewar communities but found themselves stripped of this sway in camp were treated as a security threat. Resentment over poor working conditions and low wages, inadequate housing, and rumors of guards stealing food from inmates exacerbated tensions and created pro- and anti-administration factions. Labor strikes occurred at Poston, Tule Lake and Jerome, and in two violent incidents at Poston and Manzanar in November and December 1942, individuals suspected of colluding with the WRA were beaten by other inmates. External opposition to the WRA came to a head following these events, in two congressional investigations by the House Un-American Activities Committee and another led by Senator Albert Chandler.

The leave clearance registration process, dubbed the "loyalty questionnaire" by inmates, was another significant source of discontent among incarcerated Japanese Americans. Originally drafted as a War Department recruiting tool, the 28 questions were hastily, and poorly, revised for their new purpose of assessing inmate loyalty. The form was largely devoted to determining whether the respondent was a "real" American — baseball or judo, Boy Scouts or Japanese school — but most of the ire was directed at two questions that asked inmates to volunteer for combat duty and forswear their allegiance to the Emperor of Japan. Many were offended at being asked to risk their lives for a country that had imprisoned them, and believed the question of allegiance was an implicit accusation that they had been disloyal to the United States. Although most answered in the affirmative to both, 15 percent of the total inmate population refused to fill out the questionnaire or answered "no" to one or both questions. Under pressure from War Department officials, Myer reluctantly converted Tule Lake into a maximum security segregation center for the "no-nos" who flunked the loyalty test, in July 1943.

Approximately 12,000 were transferred to Tule Lake, but of the previous residents cleared as loyal, only 6,500 accepted the WRA offer to move to another camp. The resulting overpopulation (almost 19,000 in a camp designed for 15,000 by the end of 1944) fueled existing resentment and morale problems. Conditions worsened after another labor strike and an anti-WRA demonstration that attracted a crowd of 5,000 to 10,000 and ended with several inmates being badly beaten. The entire camp was placed under martial law on November 14, 1943. Military control lasted for two months, and during this time 200 to 350 men were imprisoned in an overcrowded stockade (held under charges such as "general troublemaker" and "too well educated for his own good"), while the general population was subject to curfews, unannounced searches, and restrictions on work and recreational activities. Angry young men joined the Hoshi-dan and its auxiliary, the Hokoku-dan, a militaristic nationalist group aimed at preparing its members for a new life in Japan. This pro-Japan faction ran military drills, demonstrated against the WRA, and made threats against inmates seen as administration sympathizers. When the Renunciation Act was passed in July 1944, 5,589 (over 97 percent of them Tule Lake inmates) expressed their resentment by giving up their U.S. citizenship and applying for "repatriation" to Japan.

== End of the camps ==
The West Coast was reopened to Japanese Americans on January 2, 1945 (delayed against the wishes of Dillon Myer and others until after the November 1944 election, so as not to impede Roosevelt's reelection campaign). On July 13, 1945, Myer announced that all of the camps were to be closed between October 15 and December 15 of that year, except for Tule Lake, which held "renunciants" slated for deportation to Japan. (The vast majority of those who had renounced their U.S. citizenship later regretted the decision and fought to remain in the United States, with the help of civil rights attorney Wayne M. Collins. The camp remained open until the 4,262 petitions were resolved.) Despite wide-scale protests from inmates who had nothing to return to and felt unprepared to relocate yet again, the WRA began to eliminate all but the most basic services until those remaining were forcibly removed from camp and sent back to the West Coast.

Tule Lake closed on March 20, 1946, and Executive Order 9742, signed by President Harry S. Truman on June 26, 1946, officially terminated the WRA's mission.

== Relocation centers ==
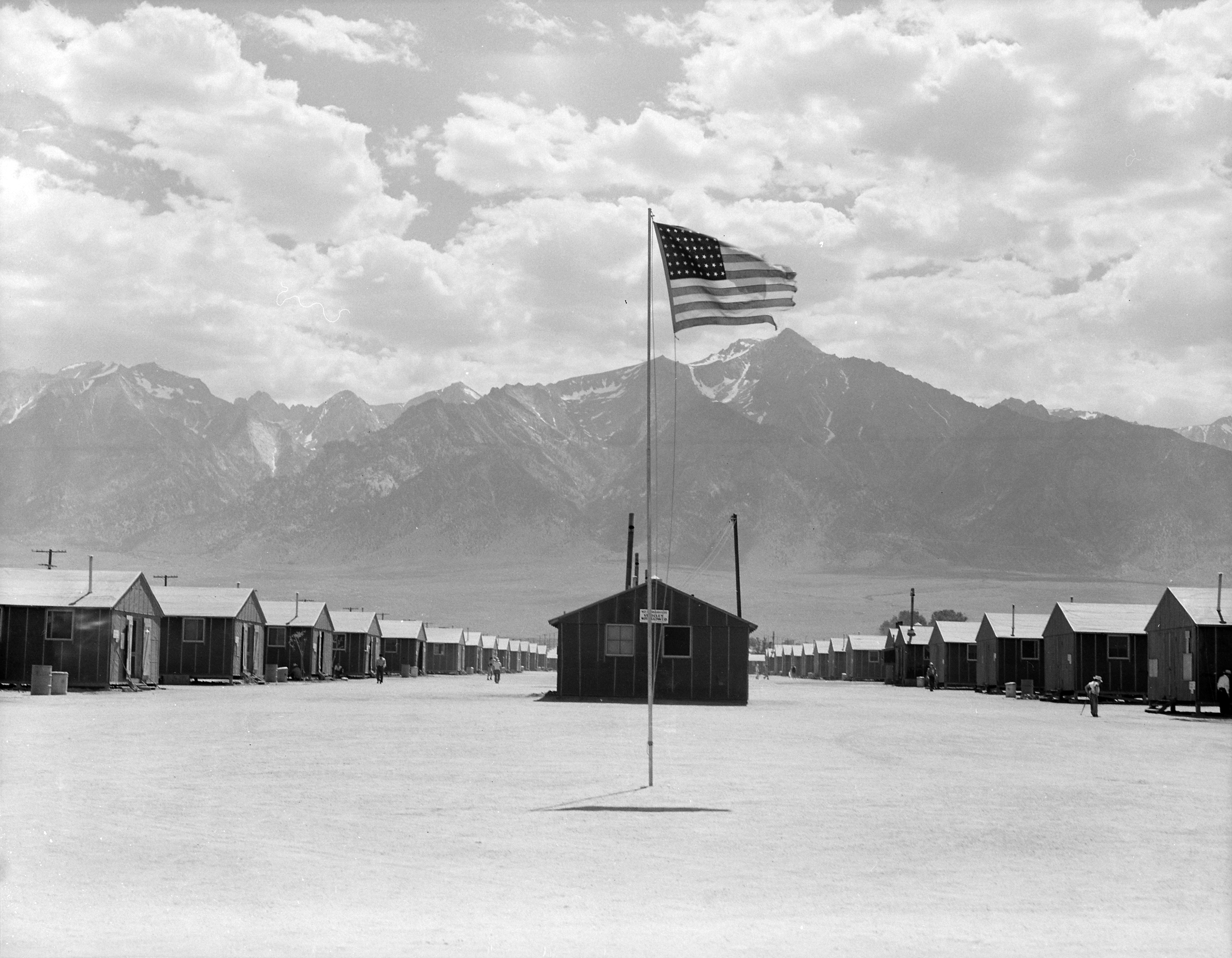
Dust storm at the Manzanar War Relocation Center

- Gila River War Relocation Center
- Granada War Relocation Center
- Heart Mountain War Relocation Center
- Jerome War Relocation Center
- Manzanar War Relocation Center
- Minidoka War Relocation Center
- Poston War Relocation Center
- Topaz War Relocation Center
- Tule Lake War Relocation Center
- Rohwer War Relocation Center

== See also ==
- Bibliography of the Japanese American Internment during World War II
- Outline of Japanese American Internment during World War II
- Densho: The Japanese American Legacy Project
- Executive Order 9066
- German American internment
- Italian American internment
- Japanese American internment
- New village
- Bantustan
