= Bibliography of the Japanese American Internment during World War II =

Japanese American internment
- Part of the U.S. homefront during World War II
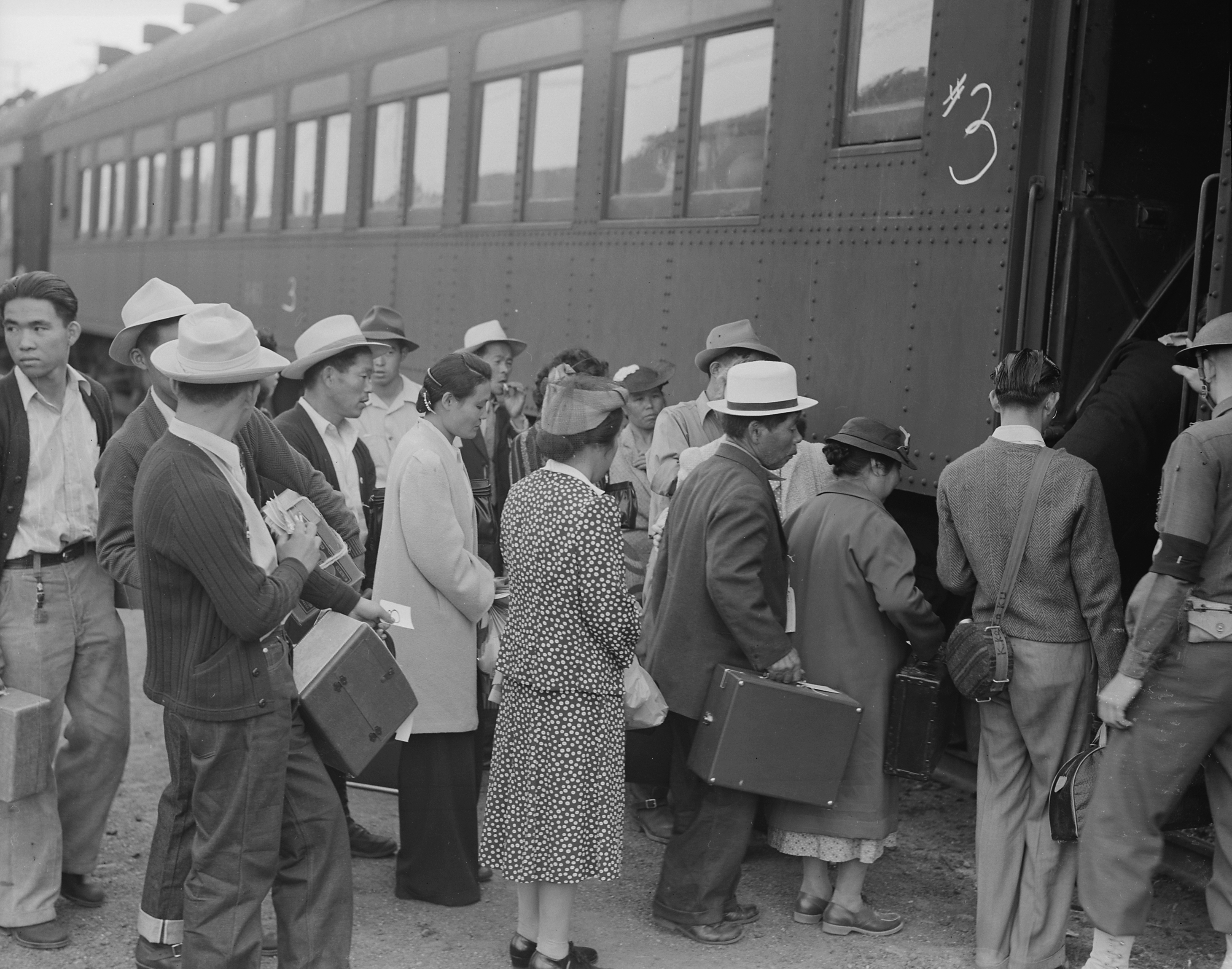
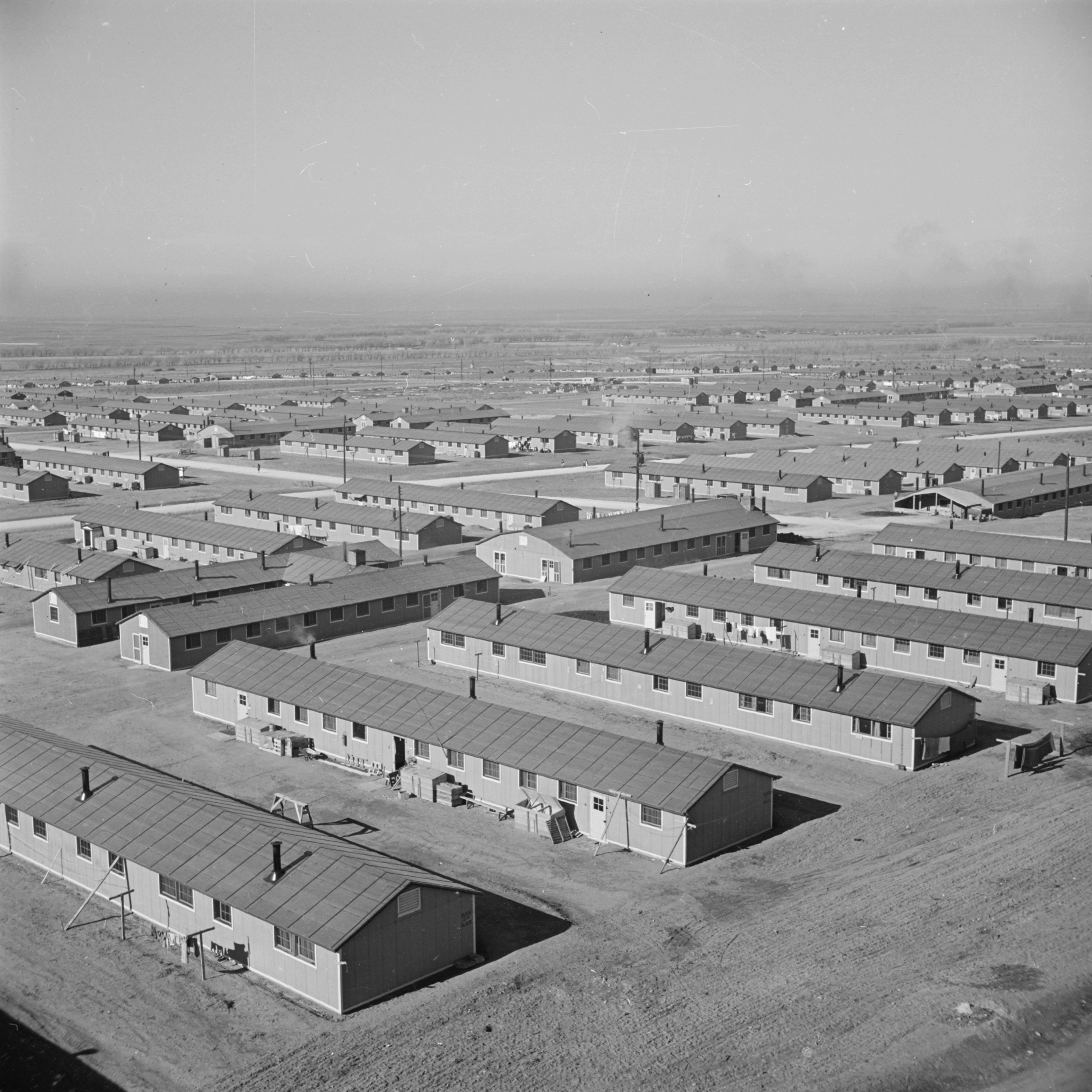
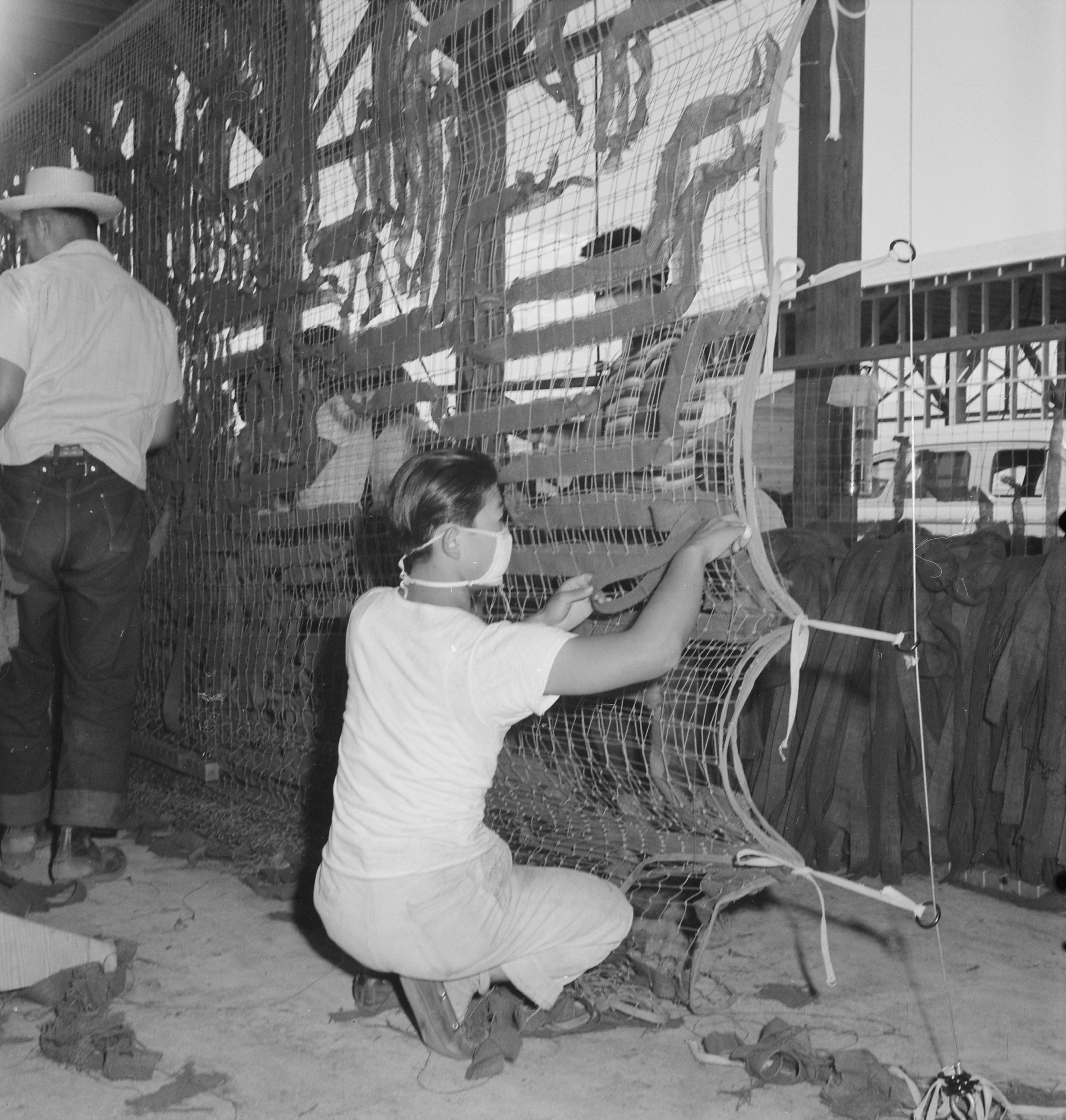
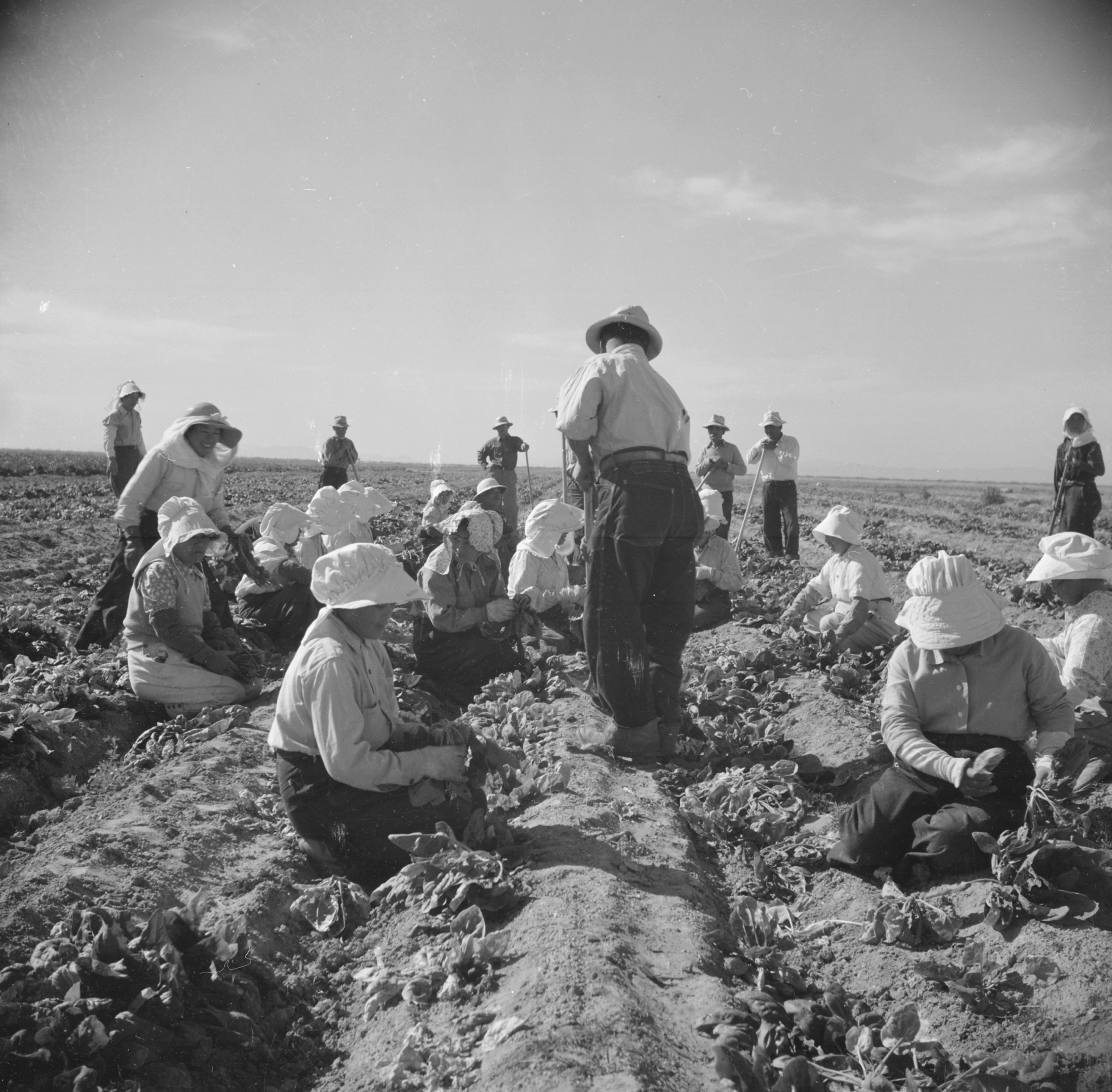
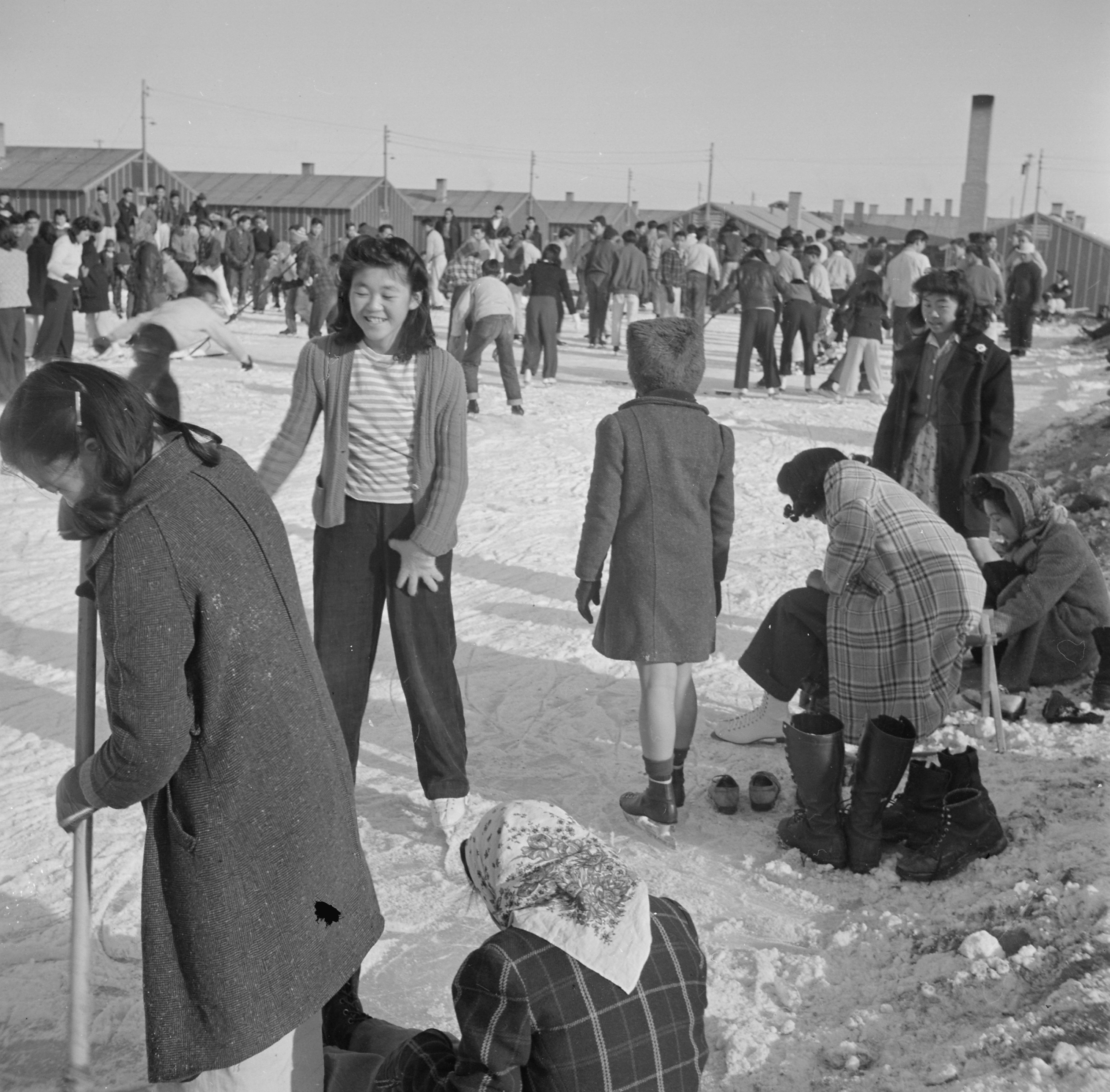
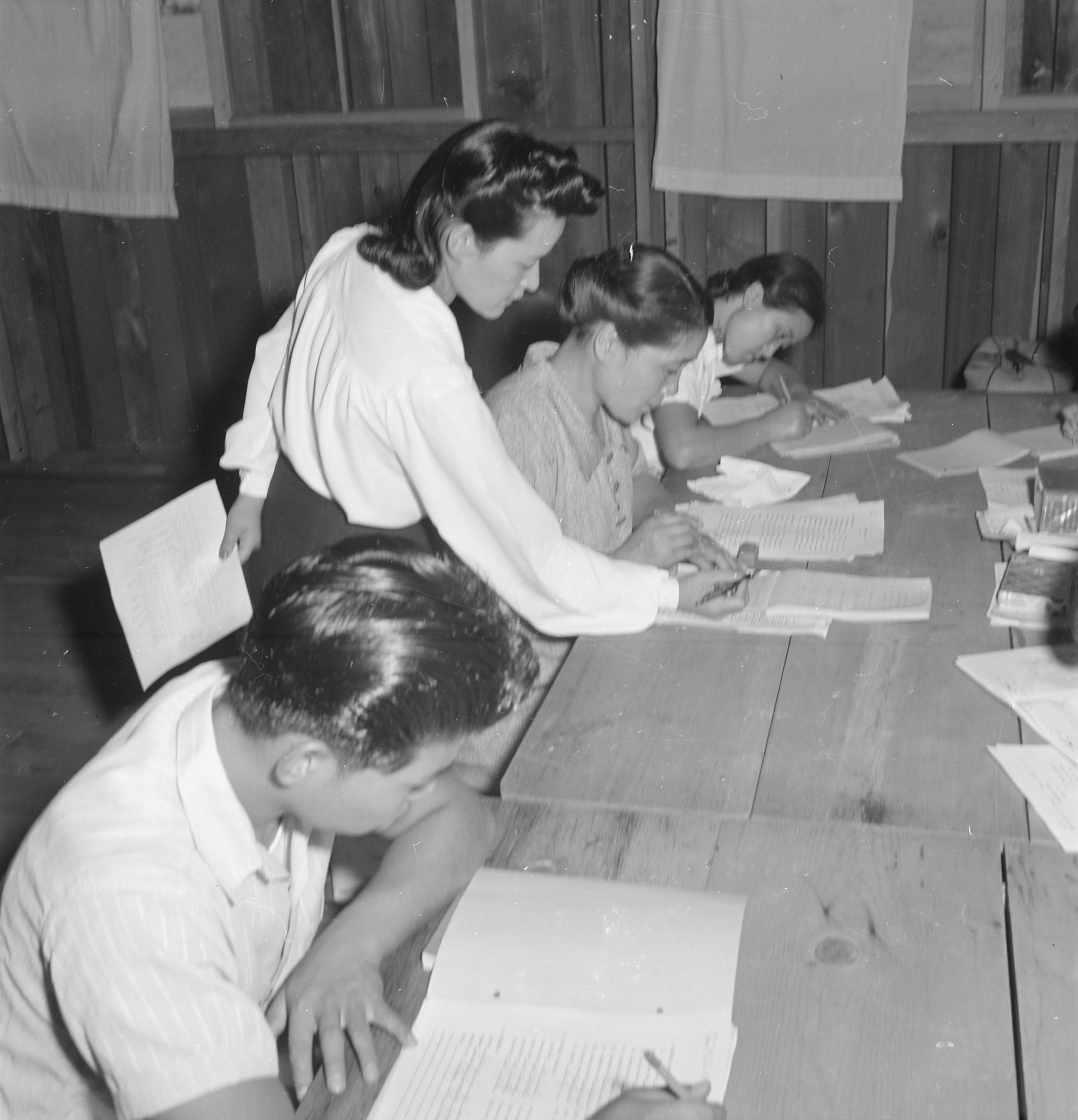
- Date: February 19, 1942 – March 20, 1946
- Location: Western United States
- Cause: Executive Order 9066 signed by Franklin D. Roosevelt
- Motive: Anti-Japanese sentiment in the United States following the attack on Pearl Harbor
- Perpetrator: United States
- Outcome: Partial financial compensation for lost property under the Japanese-American Claims Act of 1948 signed by Harry Truman; Formal apology and financial reparations given to surviving victims under the Civil Liberties Act of 1988 signed by Ronald Reagan
- Deaths: At least 1,862; at least 7 homicides by sentries
- Inquiries: Commission on Wartime Relocation and Internment of Civilians (1983)
- Prisoners: 120,000 Japanese Americans living on the West Coast

This is a bibliography of the Japanese American internment during World War II. It includes English-language academic books, including translations, and journal articles surveying the history of the Japanese American internment.

During World War II, about 120,000 people of Japanese descent were forcibly relocated and incarcerated in ten internment camps in the United States, operated by the War Relocation Authority (WRA), mostly in the western interior of the country. About two-thirds were U.S. citizens. These actions were initiated by Executive Order 9066, issued by President Franklin D. Roosevelt on February 19, 1942, following Imperial Japan's attack on Pearl Harbor on December 7, 1941. About 127,000 Japanese Americans then lived in the continental U.S., (Note: At the time of the internment, Hawaii was not a state, but the Territory of Hawaii; Hawaii became a state on August 21, 1959.) of whom about 112,000 were removed from the West Coast. About 80,000 were Nisei ('second generation'; American-born Japanese with U.S. citizenship) and Sansei ('third generation', the children of Nisei). The rest were Issei ('first generation') immigrants born in Japan, who were ineligible for citizenship. In Hawaii, where more than 150,000 Japanese Americans comprised more than one-third of the territory's population, only about 1,330 were incarcerated.

Works listed here are cited in the notes or bibliographies of scholarly sources. Each is published by an academic or major press, written by a recognized expert, or substantially reviewed in scholarly journals; borderline cases are omitted. A selection of primary sources are included. Many of the books below carry their own bibliographies; see the Further reading section for other bibliographies, and the External links section for historical sites, academic sites, and museums.

Citations follow APA style. (Note: Entries are in plain text APA 7 format without templates; templates are used only for reviews and notes.) Book have citations to academic journal or mainstream published reviews when available. For books only partly about the subject, relevant chapter or section titles are provided when useful and available. Translators of the original-language edition are included when possible. In cases where a title or name has appeared with more than one English spelling, the most recent published form is used and a footnote documents any earlier title under which the work appeared.

== Bibliography ==
=== General studies ===
- Abe, F., & Cheung, F. (Eds.). (2024). The literature of Japanese American incarceration. Penguin Classics.
- Abe, F., Nimura, T., Ishikawa, R., & Sasaki, M. (2021). We hereby refuse: Japanese American resistance to wartime incarceration. Chin Music Press.
- Adachi, K. (1976). The enemy that never was: A history of the Japanese Canadians. McClelland and Stewart.
- Alinder, J. (2009). Moving images: Photography and the Japanese American incarceration. University of Illinois Press.
- Allen, G. (1950). Hawaii's war years, 1941–1945. University of Hawaii Press.
- Austin, A. W. (2004). From concentration camp to campus: Japanese American students and World War II. University of Illinois Press.
- Azuma, E. (2005). Between two empires: Race, history, and transnationalism in Japanese America. Oxford University Press.
- Barbour, A. D. (2017). "For the good of our country": Ruth Watanabe and the "good that is in music" at the Santa Anita Detention Center. Notes, 74(2), 221–234. doi:10.1353/not.2017.0105
- Blankenship, A. M. (2016). Christianity, social justice, and the Japanese American incarceration during World War II. University of North Carolina Press.
- Bloom, L. (1947). Transitional adjustments of Japanese-American families to relocation. American Sociological Review, 12(2), 201–209. JSTOR 2086986
- Bloom, L., & Riemer, R. (1949). Removal and return: The socio-economic effects of the war on Japanese Americans. University of California Press.
- Burton, J. F., Farrell, M. M., Lord, F. B., & Lord, R. W. (1999). Confinement and ethnicity: An overview of World War II Japanese American relocation sites. Western Archeological and Conservation Center, National Park Service.
- Camp, S. L. (2016). Landscapes of Japanese American internment. Historical Archaeology, 50(1), 169–186. JSTOR 24757053
- Camp, S. L. (2018). Vision and ocular health at a World War II internment camp. World Archaeology, 50(3), 530–546. doi:10.1080/00438243.2018.1557542
- Chee, T. (2020). We are not free. Houghton Mifflin Harcourt.
- Chiang, C. Y. (2018). Nature behind barbed wire: An environmental history of the Japanese American incarceration. Oxford University Press.
- Chin, A. (2005). Long-run labor market effects of Japanese American internment during World War II on working-age male internees. Journal of Labor Economics, 23(3), 491–525.
- Coffman, T. (2021). Inclusion: How Hawaii protected Japanese Americans from mass internment, transformed itself, and changed America. University of Hawaii Press.
- Coleman, R. K. (2023). "Public enemy number one": The resistance of Japanese Americans in concentration camps, 1942–1946. Armstrong Undergraduate Journal of History, 13(2), Article 7.
- Conner, N. N. (2006). From internment to Indiana: Japanese Americans, the War Relocation Authority, the Disciples of Christ, and citizen committees in Indianapolis. Indiana Magazine of History, 102(2), 89–116. JSTOR 27792706
- Copeland, J. (2016). Stay for a dollar a day: California's church hostels during the Japanese American resettlement, 1945–1947. California History, 93(4), 42–66. JSTOR 26412684
- Crawford, C. (2013). From desert dust to city soot: Environmental justice and Japanese American internment in Karen Tei Yamashita's Tropic of Orange. MELUS, 38(3), 86–106. doi:10.1093/melus/mlt036
- Daniels, R. (1971). Concentration camps USA: Japanese Americans and World War II. Holt, Rinehart and Winston.
- Daniels, R. (1975). The decision to relocate the Japanese Americans. Robert E. Krieger Publishing Company.
- Daniels, R. (1981). Concentration camps, North America: Japanese in the United States and Canada during World War II. Robert E. Krieger Publishing Company.
- Daniels, R. (1993). Prisoners without trial: Japanese Americans in World War II. Hill and Wang.
- Daniels, R., Taylor, S. C., & Kitano, H. H. L. (Eds.). (1991). Japanese Americans: From relocation to redress (Rev. ed.). University of Washington Press.
- Eisenberg, E. (2003). "As truly American as your son": Voicing opposition to internment in three West Coast cities. Oregon Historical Quarterly, 104(4), 542–565. doi:10.1353/ohq.2003.0012
- Fiset, L. (1999). Public health in World War II assembly centers for Japanese Americans. Bulletin of the History of Medicine, 73(4), 565–584. JSTOR 44446032
- Foster, K. (2015). Teaching literacy behind barbed wire in WWII: Elementary schools in Japanese-American internment camps in Arkansas. Childhood Education, 91(5), 378–387.
- Friedlander, E. J. (1985). Freedom of press behind barbed wire: Paul Yokota and the Jerome Relocation Center newspaper. The Arkansas Historical Quarterly, 44(4), 303–313. JSTOR 40027735
- Gesensway, D., & Roseman, M. (1987). Beyond words: Images from America's concentration camps. Cornell University Press.
- Girdner, A., & Loftis, A. (1969). The great betrayal: The evacuation of the Japanese Americans during World War II. Macmillan.
- Greenberg, C. L. (1995). Black and Jewish responses to Japanese internment. Journal of American Ethnic History, 14(2), 3–37.
- Grodzins, M. (1949). Americans betrayed: Politics and the Japanese evacuation. University of Chicago Press.
- Grodzins, M. (1955). Making un-Americans. The American Journal of Sociology, 60(6), 570–582. doi:10.1086/221631
- Hansen, A. A. (2023). Manzanar mosaic: Essays and oral histories on America's first World War II Japanese American concentration camp. University Press of Colorado.
- Harth, E. (1993). Children of Manzanar. The Massachusetts Review, 34(3), 367–391. JSTOR 25090449
- Hayashi, B. M. (2004). Democratizing the enemy: The Japanese American internment. Princeton University Press.
- Hinnershitz, S. (2019). The 1942 Santa Anita detainment center labor strike and Japanese American incarceration during World War II. Southern California Quarterly, 101(3), 285–316. JSTOR 26861180
- Hinnershitz, S. D. (2021). Japanese American incarceration: The camps and coerced labor during World War II. University of Pennsylvania Press.
- Ichioka, Y. (2006). Before internment: Essays in prewar Japanese American history (E. Azuma & G. H. Chang, Eds.). Stanford University Press.
- Ivey, L. L., & Kaatz, K. W. (2017). Citizen internees: A second look at race and citizenship in Japanese American internment camps. Praeger.
- Iwamura, J. N. (2007). Critical faith: Japanese Americans and the birth of a new civil religion. American Quarterly, 59(3), 937–968. doi:10.1353/aq.2007.0058
- Jensen, G. M. (1999). System failure: Health-care deficiencies in the World War II Japanese American detention centers. Bulletin of the History of Medicine, 73(4), 602–628. JSTOR 44446034
- Kashima, T. (2003). Judgment without trial: Japanese American imprisonment during World War II. University of Washington Press.
- Kumamoto, B. (1979). The search for spies: American counterintelligence and the Japanese American community, 1931–1942. Amerasia Journal, 6(2), 45–75. doi:10.17953/amer.6.2.rw2212q8724mw376
- Leighton, A. H. (1945). The governing of men: General principles and recommendations based on experience at a Japanese relocation camp. Princeton University Press.
- Leonard, K. A. (1990). "Is that what we fought for?" Japanese Americans and racism in California: The impact of World War II. The Western Historical Quarterly, 21(4), 463–482.
- Linke, K. (2009). Dominance, resistance, and cooperation in the Tanforan Assembly Center. Amerikastudien / American Studies, 54(4), 621–655. JSTOR 41158468
- Mirikitani, J. (1978). Awake in the river. Isthmus Press.
- Mirikitani, J. (1987). Shedding silence. Celestial Arts.
- Muller, E. L. (2001). Free to die for their country: The story of the Japanese American draft resisters in World War II. University of Chicago Press.
- Muller, E. L. (2019). The War Relocation Authority and the wounding of Japanese American loyalty. Social Research, 86(3), 821–839. JSTOR 26860795
- Muller, E. L. (2023). Lawyer, jailer, ally, foe: Complicity and conscience in America's World War II concentration camps. University of North Carolina Press.
- Nagata, D. K. (1990). The Japanese American internment: Exploring the transgenerational consequences of traumatic stress. Journal of Traumatic Stress, 3(1), 47–69. doi:10.1002/jts.2490030105
- Nagata, D. K. (1990). The Japanese American internment: Perceptions of moral community, fairness, and redress. Journal of Social Issues, 46(1), 133–146.
- Nagata, D. K. (1993). Legacy of injustice: Exploring the cross-generational impact of the Japanese American internment. Plenum Press. doi:10.1007/978-1-4899-1118-6
- Nagata, D. K., Kim, J. H. J., & Nguyen, T. U. (2015). Processing cultural trauma: Intergenerational effects of the Japanese American incarceration. Journal of Social Issues, 71(2), 356–370. doi:10.1111/josi.12115
- Nagata, D. K., Kim, J. H. J., & Wu, K. (2019). The Japanese American wartime incarceration: Examining the scope of racial trauma. American Psychologist, 74(1), 36–48. doi:10.1037/amp0000303
- Nagata, D. K., Trierweiler, S. J., & Talbot, R. (1999). Long-term effects of internment during early childhood on third-generation Japanese Americans. American Journal of Orthopsychiatry, 69(1), 19–29. doi:10.1037/h0080378
- Ng, W. L. (2002). Japanese American internment during World War II: A history and reference guide. Greenwood Press.
- Nobe, L. N. (1999). The Children's Village at Manzanar: The World War II eviction and detention of Japanese American orphans. Journal of the West, 38(2), 65–71.
- O'Brien, D. J., & Fugita, S. S. (1991). The Japanese American experience. Indiana University Press.
- Okada, J. (1957). No-no boy. Charles E. Tuttle.
- Okihiro, G. Y. (1984). Religion and resistance in America's concentration camps. Phylon, 45(3), 220–233. JSTOR 274406
- Okihiro, G. Y. (1996). Whispered silences: Japanese Americans and World War II. University of Washington Press.
- Okihiro, G. Y. (1999). Storied lives: Japanese American students and World War II. University of Washington Press.
- Okihiro, G. Y. (Ed.). (2013). Encyclopedia of Japanese American internment. Greenwood.
- Okihiro, G. Y., & Sly, J. (1983). The press, Japanese Americans, and the concentration camps. Phylon, 44(1), 66–83. JSTOR 274370
- Pak, Y. K. (2002). Wherever I go, I will always be a loyal American: Schooling Seattle's Japanese Americans during World War II. RoutledgeFalmer.
- Park, Y. (2013). The role of the YWCA in the World War II internment of Japanese Americans: A cautionary tale for social work. Social Service Review, 87(3), 477–524. doi:10.1086/671987
- Park, Y. (2020). Facilitating injustice: The complicity of social workers in the forced removal and incarceration of Japanese Americans, 1941–1946. Oxford University Press.
- Pegler-Gordon, A. (2017). "New York has a concentration camp of its own": Japanese confinement on Ellis Island during World War II. Journal of Asian American Studies, 20(3), 373–404. doi:10.1353/jaas.2017.0033
- Reeves, R. (2015). Infamy: The shocking story of the Japanese American internment in World War II. Henry Holt and Co.
- Renteln, A. D. (1995). A psychohistorical analysis of the Japanese American internment. Human Rights Quarterly, 17(4), 618–648. JSTOR 762484
- Robinson, G. (2001). By order of the president: FDR and the internment of Japanese Americans. Harvard University Press.
- Robinson, G. (2009). A tragedy of democracy: Japanese confinement in North America. Columbia University Press.
- Saavedra, M. (2015). School quality and educational attainment: Japanese American internment as a natural experiment. Explorations in Economic History, 57, 59–78. doi:10.1016/j.eeh.2015.02.001
- Schweik, S. (1989). The "pre-poetics" of internment: The example of Toyo Suyemoto. American Literary History, 1(1), 89–109. doi:10.1093/alh/1.1.89
- Shaffer, R. (1999). Opposition to internment: Defending Japanese American rights during World War II. The Historian, 61(3), 597–619. JSTOR 24449883
- Shimabukuro, M. (2011). "Me inwardly, before I dared": Japanese Americans writing-to-gaman. College English, 73(6), 648–671. JSTOR 23052366
- Smith, G. S. (1991). Racial nativism and origins of Japanese American relocation. In R. Daniels, S. C. Taylor, & H. H. L. Kitano (Eds.), Japanese Americans: From relocation to redress (pp. 79–87). University of Washington Press.
- Smith, S. L. (1999). Women health workers and the color line in the Japanese American "relocation centers" of World War II. Bulletin of the History of Medicine, 73(4), 585–601. JSTOR 44446033
- Spicer, E. H., Hansen, A. T., Luomala, K., & Opler, M. K. (1969). Impounded people: Japanese-Americans in the relocation centers. University of Arizona Press.
- Spickard, P. R. (1983). The Nisei assume power: The Japanese American Citizens League, 1941–1942. Pacific Historical Review, 52(2), 147–174. JSTOR 3638793
- Spickard, P. R. (1999). Not just the quiet people: The Nisei underclass. Pacific Historical Review, 68(1), 78–94. JSTOR 3641870
- Tamura, A. H. (2004). Gardens below the watchtower: Gardens and meaning in World War II Japanese American incarceration camps. Landscape Journal, 23(1), 1–21. JSTOR 43323647
- Taylor, N. (2020). The American public's reaction to the Japanese American internment. West Virginia University Historical Review, 1(1), Article 8.
- Taylor, S. C. (1991). Evacuation and economic loss: Questions and perspectives. In R. Daniels, S. C. Taylor, & H. H. L. Kitano (Eds.), Japanese Americans: From relocation to redress (pp. 163–167). University of Washington Press.
- Taylor, S. C. (1993). Jewel of the desert: Japanese American internment at Topaz. University of California Press.
- Thomas, D. S. (1952). The salvage: Japanese American evacuation and resettlement. University of California Press.
- Toy, G. (2020). Relocating Manzanar: Environmental histories of racial violence in Jeanne Wakatsuki Houston's Farewell to Manzanar and Nina Revoyr's Southland. MELUS, 45(2), 25–45. JSTOR 27105833
- Tsukano, J. (1985). Bridge of love. Hawaii Hosts.
- Waseda, M. (2005). Extraordinary circumstances, exceptional practices: Music in Japanese American concentration camps. Journal of Asian American Studies, 8(2), 171–209. doi:10.1353/jaas.2005.0044
- Weglyn, M. N. (1976). Years of infamy: The untold story of America's concentration camps. William Morrow.
- Wenger, G. M. (2012). History matters: Children's art education inside the Japanese American internment camp. Studies in Art Education, 54(1), 21–36. JSTOR 24468128
- White, G. E. (1979). The unacknowledged lesson: Earl Warren and the Japanese relocation controversy. The Virginia Quarterly Review, 55(4), 613–629. JSTOR 26436223
- Williams, D. R. (2019). American sutra: A story of faith and freedom in the Second World War. Harvard University Press.
- Yatsushiro, T., Ishino, I., & Matsumoto, Y. (1944). The Japanese-American looks at resettlement. The Public Opinion Quarterly, 8(2), 188–201. JSTOR 2745570
- Yogi, S. (1996). You had to be one or the other: Oppositions and reconciliation in John Okada's No-No Boy. MELUS, 21(2), 63–77.
- Yoo, D. K. (2000). Growing up Nisei: Race, generation, and culture among Japanese Americans of California, 1924–1949. University of Illinois Press.

=== Military service ===
The 100th Infantry Battalion, the 442nd Regimental Combat Team, and Nisei military service. Memoirs by service members appear under Biography and memoirs.

- Asahina, R. (2006). Just Americans: How Japanese Americans won a war at home and abroad: The story of the 100th Battalion/442nd Regimental Combat Team in World War II. Gotham Books.
- Crost, L. (1994). Honor by fire: Japanese Americans at war in Europe and the Pacific. Presidio Press.
- Duus, M. U. (1987). Unlikely liberators: The men of the 100th and 442nd. University of Hawaii Press.
- Matsuo, D. (1992). Boyhood to war: History and anecdotes of the 442nd Regimental Combat Team. Mutual Publishing.
- Murphy, T. D. (1955). Ambassadors in arms: The story of Hawaii's 100th Battalion. University of Hawaii Press.
- Tamura, L. (2012). Nisei soldiers break their silence: Coming home to Hood River. University of Washington Press.

=== Redress and the legal cases ===
- Christgau, J. (1985). Collins versus the world: The fight to restore citizenship to Japanese American renunciants of World War II. Pacific Historical Review, 54(1), 1–31.
- Collins, D. E. (1985). Native American aliens: Disloyalty and the renunciation of citizenship by Japanese Americans during World War II. Greenwood Press.
- Daniels, R. (2005). The Japanese American cases, 1942–2004: A social history. Law and Contemporary Problems, 68(2), 159–171. JSTOR 27592097
- Hatamiya, L. (1992). Righting a wrong: The passage of the Civil Liberties Act of 1988. U.S.-Japan Women's Journal. English Supplement(2), 63–76. JSTOR 42772037
- Hatamiya, L. T. (1993). Righting a wrong: Japanese Americans and the passage of the Civil Liberties Act of 1988. Stanford University Press.
- Hohri, W. M. (1988). Repairing America: An account of the movement for Japanese American redress. Washington State University Press.
- Howard-Hassmann, R. E., & Lombardo, A. P. (2004). Getting to reparations: Japanese Americans and African Americans. Social Forces, 83(2), 823–840. doi:10.1353/sof.2005.0012
- Irons, P. (1983). Justice at war: The story of the Japanese American internment cases. Oxford University Press.
- Irons, P. (Ed.). (1989). Justice delayed: The record of the Japanese American internment cases. Wesleyan University Press.
- Irons, P. (1993). Justice at war: The story of the Japanese American internment cases (Rev. ed.). University of California Press.
- Maga, T. P. (1998). Ronald Reagan and redress for Japanese-American internment, 1983–88. Presidential Studies Quarterly, 28(3), 606–619. JSTOR 27551904
- Maki, M. T., Kitano, H. H. L., & Berthold, S. M. (1999). Achieving the impossible dream: How Japanese Americans obtained redress. University of Illinois Press.
- McClain, C. (Ed.). (1994). The mass internment of Japanese Americans and the quest for legal redress. Garland Publishing.
- Nakanishi, D. T. (1993). Surviving democracy's "mistake": Japanese Americans and the enduring legacy of Executive Order 9066. Amerasia Journal, 19(1), 7–36.
- Nash, P. T. (1985). Moving for redress. The Yale Law Journal, 94(3), 743–755. JSTOR 796242
- Rostow, E. V. (1945). The Japanese American cases—A disaster. The Yale Law Journal, 54(3), 489–533. JSTOR 792783
- Shimabukuro, R. S. (2001). Born in Seattle: The campaign for Japanese American redress. University of Washington Press.

=== General World War II histories ===
General histories of the war, included for context; these works are not specifically about the Japanese American internment.

- Beevor, A. (2012). The Second World War. Little, Brown.
- Hastings, M. (2011). Inferno: The world at war, 1939–1945. Alfred A. Knopf.
- Lyons, M. J., & Ulbrich, D. J. (2021). World War II: A global history (6th ed.). Routledge.
- Overy, R. (2021). Blood and ruins: The great imperial war, 1931–1945. Allen Lane.
- Toll, I. W. (2011, 2015, 2020). The Pacific War (3 vols.). W. W. Norton. (Note: Three volumes in series are named, respectively, Pacific Crucible: War at Sea in the Pacific, 1941–1942 (2011), The Conquering Tide: War in the Pacific Islands, 1942–1944 (2015), and Twilight of the Gods: War in the Western Pacific, 1944–1945 (2020).)

== Biography and memoirs ==
- Bahr, D. M. (2007). The unquiet Nisei: An oral history of the life of Sue Kunitomi Embrey. Palgrave Macmillan. doi:10.1057/9780230609990
- Bannai, L. K. (2015). Enduring conviction: Fred Korematsu and his quest for justice. University of Washington Press.
- Chang, G. H. (1997). Morning glory, evening shadow: Yamato Ichihashi and his internment writings, 1942–1945. Stanford University Press.
- De Nevers, K. C. (2004). The colonel and the pacifist: Karl Bendetsen, Perry Saito, and the incarceration of Japanese Americans during World War II. University of Utah Press.
- Doi, S. (1984). Tule Lake and the 442nd Regimental Combat Team, France and Italy. In J. Tateishi (Ed.), And justice for all: An oral history of the Japanese American detention camps (pp. 157–167). Random House. JSTOR j.ctvcwnntv.27
- Drinnon, R. (1987). Keeper of concentration camps: Dillon S. Myer and American racism. University of California Press.
- Fiset, L. (1997). Imprisoned apart: The World War II correspondence of an Issei couple. University of Washington Press.
- Gruenewald, M. M. (2005). Looking like the enemy: My story of imprisonment in Japanese American internment camps. NewSage Press.
- Hansen, A. A., & Mitson, B. E. (Eds.). (1974). Voices long silent: An oral inquiry into the Japanese American evacuation. Japanese American Project, Oral History Program, California State University, Fullerton.
- Harris, C. E. (1999). Dusty exile: Looking back at Japanese relocation during World War II. Mutual Publishing.
- Havey, L. Y. N. (2014). Gasa-gasa girl goes to camp: A Nisei youth behind a World War II fence. University of Utah Press.
- Hawaii Nikkei History Editorial Board. (Ed.). (1999). Japanese eyes, American heart: Personal reflections of Hawaii's World War II Nisei soldiers. Tendai Educational Foundation.
- Higa, T. T. (1988). Memoirs of a certain Nisei (E. H. Taniguchi, Ed.; M. Sakihara, Trans.). Higa Publications.
- Higuchi, S. A. (2020). Setsuko's secret: Heart Mountain and the legacy of the Japanese American incarceration. University of Wisconsin Press.
- Hirabayashi, G. K., Hirabayashi, J. A., & Hirabayashi, L. R. (2013). A principled stand: The story of Hirabayashi v. United States. University of Washington Press.
- Houston, J. W., & Houston, J. D. (1973). Farewell to Manzanar. Houghton Mifflin.
- Japanese American Internment History Project. (Eds.). (2002). Standing guard: Telling our stories. Sierra College Press.
- Johns, B. (2011). Signs of home: The paintings and wartime diary of Kamekichi Tokita. University of Washington Press.
- Kanda, J. (1984). Tule Lake and the 442nd Regimental Combat Team, France and Italy. In J. Tateishi (Ed.), And justice for all: An oral history of the Japanese American detention camps (pp. 120–123). Random House. JSTOR j.ctvcwnntv.21
- Kawaguchi, T. (1984). Topaz and the 442nd Regimental Combat Team, France and Italy. In J. Tateishi (Ed.), And justice for all: An oral history of the Japanese American detention camps (pp. 176–185). Random House. JSTOR j.ctvcwnntv.29
- Kiyota, M. (1997). Beyond loyalty: The story of a Kibei. University of Hawaii Press.
- Makabe, W. (1984). The 442nd Regimental Combat Team in Italy. In J. Tateishi (Ed.), And justice for all: An oral history of the Japanese American detention camps (pp. 250–259). Random House. JSTOR j.ctvcwnntv.37
- Masuda, M. (2008). Letters from the 442nd: The World War II correspondence of a Japanese American medic. University of Washington Press.
- Okubo, M. (2014). Citizen 13660 (Reprint ed.). University of Washington Press.
- Sone, M. (1953). Nisei daughter. Little, Brown.
- Takei, G., Eisinger, J., Scott, S., & Becker, H. (2019). They called us enemy. Top Shelf Productions.
- Tateishi, J. (1984). And justice for all: An oral history of the Japanese American detention camps. Random House.
- Uchida, Y. (1982). Desert exile: The uprooting of a Japanese American family. University of Washington Press.
- Yost, I. A. S., Yost, M., & Markrich, M. (Eds.). (2006). Combat chaplain: The personal story of the World War II chaplain of the Japanese American 100th Battalion. University of Hawaii Press.

== Historiography and memory ==
- Brown, K. (1996). The eclipse of history: Japanese America and a treasure chest of forgetting. Public Culture, 9(1), 69–91.
- Camp, S. L. (2021). The future of Japanese diaspora archaeology in the United States. International Journal of Historical Archaeology, 25(3), 877–894. doi:10.1007/s10761-020-00564-6
- Clark, B. J. (2018). Artifacts, contested histories, and other archaeological hotspots. Historical Archaeology, 52(3), 544–552. doi:10.1007/s41636-018-0128-5
- Daniels, R. (1982). The decisions to relocate the North American Japanese: Another look. Pacific Historical Review, 51(1), 71–77. JSTOR 3639821
- Daniels, R. (2002). Incarceration of the Japanese Americans: A sixty-year perspective. The History Teacher, 35(3), 297–310. JSTOR 3054440
- Fujita, D. K. (2018). Returning to Amache: Former Japanese American internees assist archaeological research team. Historical Archaeology, 52(3), 553–560. doi:10.1007/s41636-018-0129-4
- Hansen, A. A. (1997). Oral history, Japanese America, and the voicing of a multiplex community of memory. The Oral History Review, 24(1), 113–122. JSTOR 3675400
- Hayashi, R. T. (2003). Transfigured patterns: Contesting memories at the Manzanar National Historic Site. The Public Historian, 25(4), 51–71. doi:10.1525/tph.2003.25.4.51
- Inouye, K. M. (2016). The long afterlife of Nikkei wartime incarceration. Stanford University Press.
- Ishii, D. S. (2018). On Japanese American remembrance and the liberal limits of dissenting citizenship. American Quarterly, 70(2), 335–351. JSTOR 26794735
- Ishizuka, K. L. (2006). Lost and found: Reclaiming the Japanese American incarceration. University of Illinois Press.
- Kashima, T. (1980). Japanese American internees return, 1945 to 1955: Readjustment and social amnesia. Phylon, 41(2), 107–115. JSTOR 274964
- Murray, A. Y. (1997). "Military necessity," World War II internment, and Japanese American history. Reviews in American History, 25(2), 319–325. JSTOR 30030791
- Murray, A. Y. (2008). Historical memories of the Japanese American internment and the struggle for redress. Stanford University Press.
- Okamura, R. Y. (1982). The American concentration camps: A cover-up through euphemistic terminology. Journal of Ethnic Studies, 10(3), 95–115.
- Rasel, J. T. (2004). An historiography of racism: Japanese American internment, 1942–1945. Historia, 13.
- Ross, D. E. (2021). A history of Japanese diaspora archaeology. International Journal of Historical Archaeology, 25(3), 592–624. doi:10.1007/s10761-020-00566-4
- Stanutz, K. (2018). Inscrutable grief: Memorializing Japanese American internment in Miné Okubo's Citizen 13660. American Studies, 56(3–4), 47–68. doi:10.1353/ams.2018.0002
- Sundquist, E. J. (1988). The Japanese-American internment: A reappraisal. The American Scholar, 57(4), 529–547. JSTOR 41211623
- Suzuki, P. T. (1981). Anthropologists in the wartime camps for Japanese Americans: A documentary study. Dialectical Anthropology, 6(1), 23–60. doi:10.1007/bf02068210
- Yoo, D. (1996). Captivating memories: Museology, concentration camps, and Japanese American history. American Quarterly, 48(4), 680–699. doi:10.1353/aq.1996.0045

== Primary sources ==
- Commission on Wartime Relocation and Internment of Civilians. (1982). Personal justice denied: Report of the Commission on Wartime Relocation and Internment of Civilians. U.S. Government Printing Office.

== See also ==
- Outline of Japanese American Internment during World War II
- Internment of Japanese Americans
- Anti-Japanese sentiment in the United States
- Japanese Americans
- History of Japanese Americans
- World War II evacuation and expulsion
- Yellow Peril
- Xenophobia in the United States
