= Dillon S. Myer =

American government official (1891–1982)

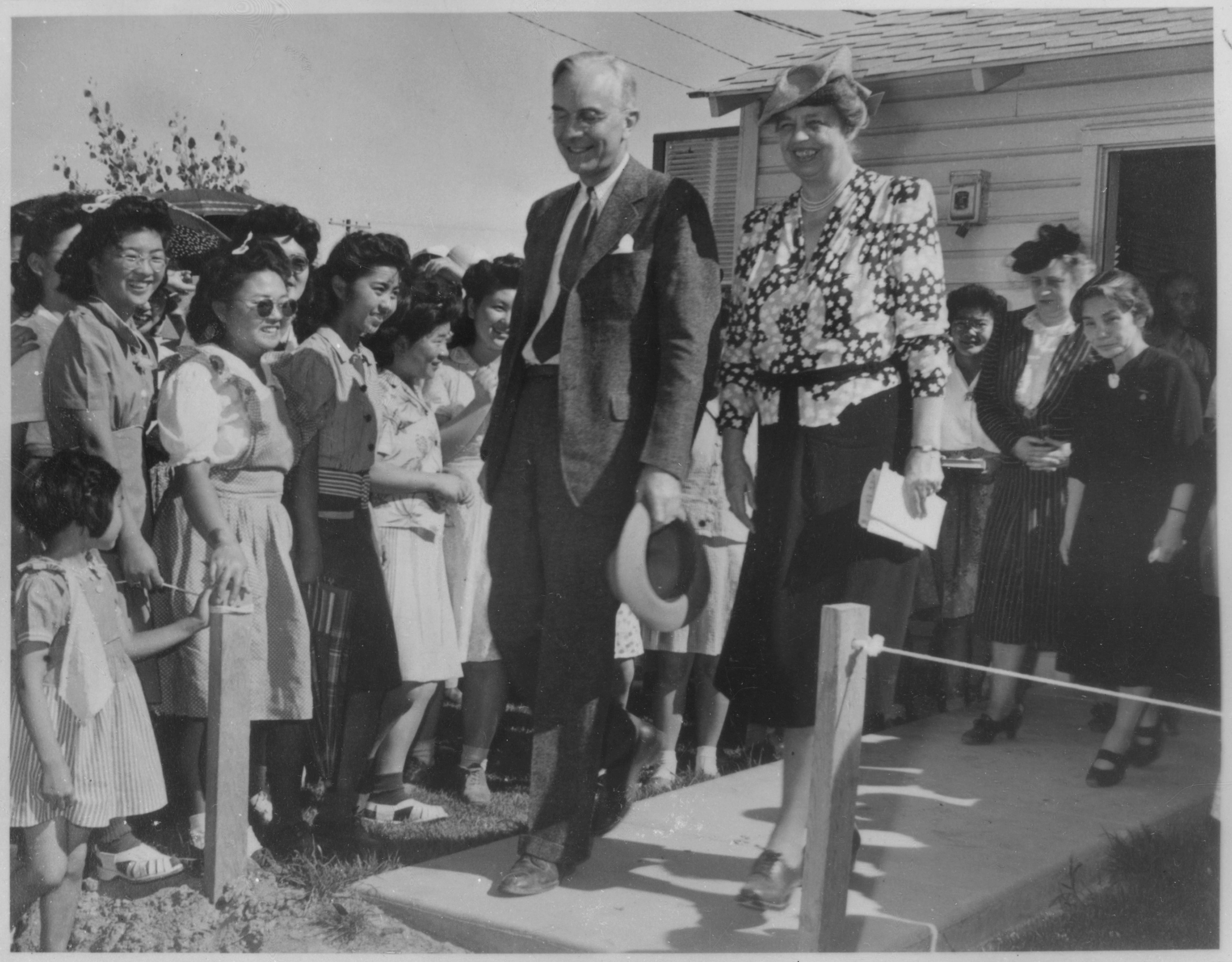
- Dillon S. Myer, Director of the War Relocation Authority, with First Lady Eleanor Roosevelt, visiting the Gila River War Relocation Center on April 23, 1943.

Commissioner of Indian Affairs
- In office May 1950 – March 20, 1953
- Preceded by: John R. Nichols
- Succeeded by: Glenn L. Emmons

President of the Institute of Inter-American Affairs
- In office 1948–1950

Director of the Federal Public Housing Authority
- In office 1946–1947

Director of the War Relocation Authority
- In office 1942–1946

Personal details
- Born: Dillon Seymour Myer; September 4, 1891 Hebron, Ohio, U.S.
- Died: October 21, 1982 (aged 91)
- Education: Ohio State University; Columbia University (MA)

Dillon Seymour Myer (September 4, 1891 – October 21, 1982) was a United States government official who served as Director of the War Relocation Authority during World War II, Director of the Federal Public Housing Authority, and Commissioner of the Bureau of Indian Affairs in the early 1950s. He also served as President of the Institute of Inter-American Affairs.

== Early life and education ==
Myer was born September 4, 1891, in Hebron, Ohio. He earned a bachelor's degree from Ohio State University in 1914 and an M.A. in education from Columbia University in 1926. From 1914 to 1916, he taught agronomy at the University of Kentucky.

He transitioned into the civil service with the federal government, taking a job with the Agricultural Adjustment Administration in 1933, in the administration of President Franklin D. Roosevelt. He continued his work with the Department of Agriculture, becoming assistant chief of the Soil Conservation Service in 1938.

== War Relocation Authority ==
On June 17, 1942, Myer was appointed to lead the War Relocation Authority, and ran it until its dissolution in 1946. He replaced Milton S. Eisenhower, who had opposed the mass incarceration of Japanese Americans and resigned after 90 days. Myer would eventually come to agree that the internment was a mistake, but believed that the resettlement efforts he headed toward the end of the war worked toward correcting it.

In one of his first actions as WRA Director, Myer established a formal leave program to allow citizen Nisei (second generation ethnic Japanese Americans) to exit camps for work outside the exclusion zone. (Kibei, United States citizens who had spent considerable time in Japan and were viewed by the WRA with suspicion, and non-citizen Issei were prohibited from leaving the camps.) The leave clearance program helped alleviate overcrowding in some of the camps and, especially important for Myer, began the process of resettling an inmate population that would have to be released at the end of the war. In some states where anti-Japanese prejudice remained high, this leave program was opposed. One historian characterized Myer as a principled hero struggling to end the program in the face of a broad, fear-driven movement perpetuating it. Myer himself told an ACLU conference in 1944 that "super-patriotic organizations and individuals" and Hearst newspapers on the West Coast were hindering the resettlement of tens of thousands of "harmless" detainees who were eligible to leave the camps.

In July 1943, Myer was called to testify before a subcommittee of the House Un-American Activities Committee. Triggered in large part by news of the resettlement program, and fed by ongoing rumors that the WRA was "coddling" inmates while the larger public suffered from wartime shortages, the Dies Committee was charged with investigating potential fifth column activity in the camps. The committee's final report was anticlimactic; Myer was able to disprove the more inflammatory claims. The suggestions offered by the committee were for the most part in line with existing WRA policies.

Under Myer's administration of the WRA, the agency pushed for assimilation among Nisei resettlers. Early in 1943 Myer had established WRA field offices in Chicago and Salt Lake City, two cities that received a significant number of those released on work leave. The offices provided support to Japanese Americans, helping them find employment and housing in communities where discrimination was widespread. Following Myer's directive, WRA workers also encouraged Nisei to "blend in" by avoiding speaking Japanese or spending time with other Japanese Americans. The policy was to disperse the former internees in order to avoid large congregations of Japanese American communities or reestablishment of the pre-war Japantowns. (Those were largely the result of discriminatory policies of many cities where Japanese immigrants settled, including prohibiting their ownership of land.)

Myer continued to work with an advisory council established by his predecessor and headed by Japanese American Citizens League leader Mike Masaoka (also a controversial figure). Together the WRA and JACL emphasized hyper-patriotism and assimilation with white Americans as the primary means for Japanese Americans to achieve success. Additionally, while Myer was supportive of the "good" Nisei who were eligible for leave clearance, those who were seen as "troublemakers" – mostly protestors and those who failed the so-called "loyalty questionnaire" – were removed from the general population and sent to segregated maximum security camps.

President Harry S. Truman awarded Myer the Medal for Merit for his work at the Authority. In 1946 the Japanese American Citizens League honored him for his "courageous and inspired leadership." In 1971, he published Uprooted Americans: the Japanese Americans and the War Relocation Authority during World War II.

== Bureau of Indian Affairs ==
Myer led the Bureau of Indian Affairs in the Department of Interior from May 1950 until President Dwight D. Eisenhower accepted his resignation in March 1953, as part of the change in administration following his election. It was typical of high-level political appointees to be replaced by new presidents. Early in Myer's tenure, Oliver La Farge, then President of the Association on American Indian Affairs, expressed optimism based on Myer's record that he and new Secretary of the Interior Oscar L. Chapman would offer tribes more assistance and less paternalism.

Instead, Myer accelerated the termination policy begun in the 1940s to withdraw the federal government from Indian affairs and liquidate Indian property. This was ultimately considered to be an "abject failure." Myer supported termination so avidly that a year into his tenure at BIA, Harold Ickes (then United States Secretary of Interior and a key figure in implementing the New Deal), called Myer "a Hitler and Mussolini rolled into one."

Ultimately, Myer faced "vigorous" criticism from the AAIA, for example in its opposition to his effort to broaden the powers of Bureau law-enforcement officers, who had jurisdiction on reservations of federally recognized tribes. Despite comparing Bureau policy under Myer to the Japanese internment, "designed to reduce Indians to the condition of prisoners of the bureau," Felix S. Cohen told the House Interior Committee that he believed Myer to be "a man of the highest integrity."

=== Indian termination policy ===
From the time Myer joined the Bureau of Indian Affairs, he "felt very strongly that the Bureau of Indian Affairs should get out of business as quickly as possible but that the job must be done with honor." He was surprised to learn that the large majority of Indians, including their leaders, did not support termination policies. He attributed this to lack of understanding by some well-meaning people, coupled with deception by some lawyers who worked prominently with tribes (see "Tribal legal representation" below).

Myer's administration of the Indian termination policy was consistent with his continued support for:

- Withdrawing federal recognition and trust responsibility from tribes supposedly ready to support themselves, a position advanced in Congress, especially by Senator Arthur Vivian Watkins
- Relocating Indians from reservations to major cities
- Transferring the Bureau's educational functions to local public schools or state departments of education
- Transferring agricultural extension to the state extension services
- Withdrawing the Bureau from providing health services (including its operation of about 60 hospitals)
- Subjecting tribal lands to state law enforcement jurisdiction, rather than federal, as it had been under the BIA and FBI (for certain classes of crime)

Upon leaving office, Myer wrote to his successor Glenn L. Emmons: "In order to implement these proposals and for the benefit of the Indians a strong hand will have to be taken both by the Department [of the Interior] and Congress."

=== Tribal legal representation ===
As early as 1950, reformer John Collier (who led BIA for 12 years under President Roosevelt) accused Myer of taking a stance of "personal patronage" toward tribes through his control over Indian legal affairs. Myer later attributed Collier's negative opinion to an inadvertent dispute in 1942 over the future of Japanese internees at the Poston War Relocation Center, located on the Colorado River Indian Reservation, when Collier was BIA commissioner and Myer headed the War Relocation Authority.

Serious controversy arose when Myer drafted and the Department of the Interior promulgated proposed regulations that would allow Myer to veto contracts for legal representation between tribes and attorneys. The move to control tribal legal representation grew out of frustration by Democratic members of Congress with lawsuits brought on behalf of tribes by a few particular lawyers, especially Felix S. Cohen, architect of the 1934 Indian Reorganization Act and author of the Handbook of Federal Indian Law. Myer viewed Cohen, counsel for the Association on American Indian Affairs; and James E. Curry, counsel for the National Congress of American Indians, as examples of lawyers who deliberately misled Indian tribes and the public. He believed they were using Indian organizations as fronts to advance their own financial interests in tribal representation contracts and consulting fees.

Opponents of Myer's regulation included the National Congress of American Indians, the American Civil Liberties Union, the National Association for the Advancement of Colored People, the Association on American Indian Affairs, a number of individual tribes, and much of the legal profession, including the American Bar Association. Secretary of the Interior Oscar L. Chapman finally laid the controversy to rest by abandoning Myer's regulation, leaving in place 1938 regulations dating to the tenure of reformer John Collier, who had studied and worked in Native American policy before coming to the government.
