= 1944 New Mexico gubernatorial election =

- November 7, 1944
- Turnout: 27.75%
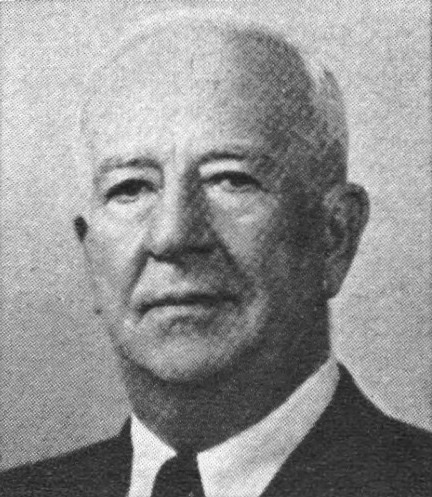

Nominee	John J. Dempsey	Carroll G. Gunderson
Party	Democratic	Republican
Popular vote	76,443	71,113
Percentage	51.81%	48.19%
- County results Dempsey: 50–60% 60–70% 70–80% Gunderson: 50–60% 60–70%
Governor before election
John J. Dempsey
Democratic
Elected Governor
John J. Dempsey
Democratic

The 1944 New Mexico gubernatorial election took place on November 7, 1944, in order to elect the Governor of New Mexico. Incumbent Democrat John J. Dempsey won reelection to a second term.

== Primary election ==
=== Republican primary ===
1944 Republican primary election results
Party	Candidate	Votes	%
Republican	Carroll G. Gunderson	9,477	59.35%
Republican	Glenn L. Emmons	6,492	40.65%
Total votes		15,969	100.00%

=== Democratic primary ===
1944 Democratic primary election results
Party	Candidate	Votes	%
Democratic	John J. Dempsey (incumbent)	29,895	82.17%
Democratic	Edna Peterson	6,489	17.84%
Total votes		36,384	100.00%

== General election ==
=== Results ===
1944 New Mexico gubernatorial election
Party	Candidate	Votes	%	±%
Democratic	John J. Dempsey (incumbent)	76,443	51.81%	−2.74%
Republican	Carroll G. Gunderson	71,113	48.19%	+2.74%
Majority		5,330	3.61%	
Total votes		147,556	100.00%	
Democratic hold		Swing	-5.48%	

=== Results by county ===
County	John J. Dempsey Democratic		Joseph F. Tondre Republican		Margin		Total votes cast
County	#	%	#	%	#	%	Total votes cast
Bernalillo	9,894	43.20%	13,008	56.80%	-3,114	-13.60%	22,902
Catron	550	43.38%	718	56.62%	-168	-13.25%	1,268
Chaves	3,476	56.51%	2,675	43.49%	801	13.02%	6,151
Colfax	2,870	52.31%	2,617	47.69%	253	4.61%	5,487
Curry	3,439	62.64%	2,051	37.36%	1,388	25.28%	5,490
De Baca	677	56.51%	521	43.49%	156	13.02%	1,198
Doña Ana	3,978	56.65%	3,044	43.35%	934	13.30%	7,022
Eddy	5,279	72.71%	1,981	27.29%	3,298	45.43%	7,260
Grant	3,019	57.36%	2,244	42.64%	775	14.73%	5,263
Guadalupe	1,399	44.81%	1,723	55.19%	-324	-10.38%	3,122
Harding	628	44.29%	790	55.71%	-162	-11.42%	1,418
Hidalgo	833	73.52%	300	26.48%	533	47.04%	1,133
Lea	2,898	71.29%	1,167	28.71%	1,731	42.58%	4,065
Lincoln	1,284	47.21%	1,436	52.79%	-152	-5.59%	2,720
Luna	1,381	56.97%	1,043	43.03%	338	13.94%	2,424
McKinley	2,099	58.52%	1,488	41.48%	611	17.03%	3,587
Mora	1,320	42.09%	1,816	57.91%	-496	-15.82%	3,136
Otero	1,819	56.95%	1,375	43.05%	444	13.90%	3,194
Quay	2,210	61.13%	1,405	38.87%	805	22.27%	3,615
Rio Arriba	3,690	50.48%	3,620	49.52%	70	0.96%	7,310
Roosevelt	2,568	66.63%	1,286	33.37%	1,282	33.26%	3,854
San Juan	1,025	41.58%	1,440	58.42%	-415	-16.84%	2,465
San Miguel	4,325	50.95%	4,163	49.05%	162	1.91%	8,488
Sandoval	1,280	48.36%	1,367	51.64%	-87	-3.29%	2,647
Santa Fe	4,480	45.07%	5,460	54.93%	-980	-9.86%	9,940
Sierra	897	43.84%	1,149	56.16%	-252	-12.32%	2,046
Socorro	1,848	47.15%	2,071	52.85%	-223	-5.69%	3,919
Taos	2,430	49.05%	2,524	50.95%	-94	-1.90%	4,954
Torrance	1,338	39.20%	2,075	60.80%	-737	-21.59%	3,413
Union	1,315	45.42%	1,580	54.58%	-265	-9.15%	2,895
Valencia	2,194	42.44%	2,976	57.56%	-782	-15.13%	5,170
Total	76,443	51.81%	71,113	48.19%	5,330	3.61%	147,556

==== Counties that flipped from Democratic to Republican ====
- Bernalillo
- Catron
- Guadalupe
- Harding
- Sierra
- Union
